= List of organisms named after famous people (born 1800–1899) =

In biological nomenclature, organisms often receive scientific names that honor a person. A taxon (e.g. species or genus; plural: taxa) named in honor of another entity is an eponymous taxon, and names specifically honoring a person or persons are known as patronyms. Scientific names are generally formally published in peer-reviewed journal articles or larger monographs along with descriptions of the named taxa and ways to distinguish them from other taxa. Following rules of Latin grammar, species or subspecies names derived from a man's name often end in -i or -ii if named for an individual, and -orum if named for a group of men or mixed-sex group, such as a family. Similarly, those named for a woman often end in -ae, or -arum for two or more women.

This list is part of the List of organisms named after famous people, and includes organisms named after famous individuals born between 1 January 1800 and 31 December 1899. It also includes ensembles in which at least one member was born within those dates; but excludes companies, institutions, ethnic groups or nationalities, and populated places. It does not include organisms named for fictional entities (which can be found in the List of organisms named after works of fiction), for biologists, paleontologists or other natural scientists, (Note: French naturalist Eugène Simon, for instance, has almost 100 eponymous species just in the field of arachnology.) nor for associates or family members of researchers who were not otherwise notable; exceptions are made, however, for natural scientists who are much more famous for other aspects of their lives, such as, for example, writers Vladimir Nabokov or Beatrix Potter.

Organisms named after famous people born earlier can be found in:

- List of organisms named after famous people (born before 1800)

Organisms named after famous people born later can be found in:

- List of organisms named after famous people (born 1900–1924)
- List of organisms named after famous people (born 1925–1949)
- List of organisms named after famous people (born 1950–1974)
- List of organisms named after famous people (born 1975–present)

The scientific names are given as originally described (their basionyms); subsequent research may have placed species in different genera, or rendered them taxonomic synonyms of previously described taxa. Some of these names may be unavailable in the zoological sense or illegitimate in the botanical sense due to senior homonyms already having the same name.

== List (people born 1800–1899) ==
Yellow background shading indicates that this taxon name has been subsequently modified (e.g. species transferred to a different genus), but the eponymy is still valid
Pink background shading indicates that this taxon name is invalid because of homonymy, or has been synonymised and is no longer in use, or is considered a nomen dubium

Taxon	Type	Namesake	Notes	Taxon image	Namesake image	Ref
Abatus shackletoni Koehler, 1911	Sea urchin	Ernest Shackleton	A species native to the Southern Ocean, described from specimens collected at Cape Royds by the Nimrod Expedition, led by Shackleton.			
Abelopsocus truganiniae Schmidt & New, 2008	Barklouse	Truganini	A Tasmanian species "Named for Truganini, considered to be the last surviving full-blood indigenous person from Tasmania."			
Abies borisii-regis Mattf.	Conifer	Boris III of Bulgaria	Known as Bulgarian fir, Macedonian fir or King Boris fir, this species, native to the Balkan peninsula, was described during Tsar Boris III's reign in Bulgaria, and named in his honour.			
Ablerus longfellowi Girault, 1913	Wasp	Henry Wadsworth Longfellow	"This truly remarkable species is respectfully dedicated to Henry W. Longfellow, the poet."			
Abyssocladia escheri Ekins, Erpenbeck & Hooper, 2020	Sponge	M. C. Escher	"Named after the Dutch artist Mauritus [sic] Cornelis Escher, 1898–1972, for the shape of the abyssochelae resembling a 3D puzzle similar to something that Escher might have illustrated."			
Actinoceras amundseni † Foerste, 1921	Nautiloid	Roald Amundsen	A fossil species from the Ordovician of Arctic Canada, described from a specimen collected by the expedition of the Gjøa, led by Amundsen.			
Aeginura grimaldii Maas, 1904	Jellyfish	Albert I, Prince of Monaco	The prince was born Albert Grimaldi. This deep-sea hydrozoan was described from specimens collected by one of the prince's research yachts, the Hirondelle.			
Afrikanetz foucauldi Yakovlev et al., 2023	Moth	Charles de Foucauld	A carpenter moth found in the Hoggar Mountains, Algeria, "named after Charles Eugène de Foucauld de Pontbriand, Viscount of Foucauld (1858–1916) ‒ a French officer, explorer, geographer, ethnographer, Catholic priest and hermit who lived among the Tuareg people in the Hoggar Mountains. He was assassinated in 1916; canonized by Pope Francis in 2022."			
Agave victoriae-reginae T.Moore	Flowering plant	Queen Victoria				
Akanthinotanais rossi Błażewicz, Jakiel, Bamber & Bird, 2021	Crustacean	James Clark Ross	A deep-sea tanaid found in South Georgia and the South Sandwich Islands, "name[d] in honour of Sir James Clark Ross, a British Royal Navy officer and explorer of the Antarctic."			
Alaptus maccabei Girault, 1914	Wasp	Joseph McCabe	"Respectfully dedicated to Joseph McCabe, the former Roman Catholic priest, now writer on the philosophical questions of the time." Subsequently synonymised with Alaptus minimus.			
Aleiodes cacuangoi Shimbori & Shaw, 2014	Wasp	Dolores Cacuango	A mummy wasp native to Ecuador, "named in honor to Dolores Cacuango, for her pioneering, outstanding brave efforts for the indigenous rights in Ecuador."			
Aleiodes frosti Shimbori & Shaw, 2014	Wasp	Robert Frost	The patronym refers to Frost's The Road Not Taken: the larvae emerge from the host caterpillar in a way different from all other relatives.			
Alexandromenia grimaldii Leloup, 1946	Solenogaster (a shell-less, worm-like mollusk)	Albert I, Prince of Monaco	The prince was born Albert Grimaldi. This species was described from specimens collected by one of the prince's research yachts, the Princesse Alice II.			
Alisphaera gaudii Kleijne et al., 2001	Alga	Antoni Gaudí	"The coccolith structure reminds of Gaudí's architecture."			
Almafuerte Grismado & Carrión, 2017	Spider	Pedro Bonifacio Palacios and Almafuerte (band)	A genus of South American ground spiders; ""Almafuerte" is the pseudonymous [sic] of Pedro Bonifacio Palacios (San Justo 1854 - La Plata 1917), an influential Argentine poet and teacher; the name is also shared with a famous Argentine heavy-metal band leaded [sic] by Ricardo Iorio."			
Alophomopsis spenceri Girault, 1913	Wasp	Herbert Spencer	Subsequently transferred to the genus Eulophinusia.			
Alophomorphella edisoni Girault, 1915	Wasp	Thomas Edison	Subsequently transferred to the genus Elachertus.			
Alterosa castroalvesi Dumas, Calor & Nessimian, 2013	Caddisfly	Castro Alves	A species native to Bahia state, Brazil, "named in memory of Antônio Frederico de Castro Alves, known as "the poet of the slaves" because of his sympathy for the Brazilian abolitionist cause. Castro Alves was born in Bahia state in 1847 and died at 1871. He is the patron of the 7th chair of the Brazilian Academy of Letters. Some of his abolitionist poems, like Espumas Flutuantes, A Cachoeira de Paulo Afonso, and O Navio Negreiro, were collected in a posthumous book called Os Escravos, published in 1883."			
Amplaria muiri Shear & Krejca, 2007	Millipede	John Muir				
Anagyrus emersoni Girault, 1913	Wasp	Ralph Waldo Emerson	"Respectfully dedicated to R. W. Emerson for his essay on "War.""; Subsequently transferred to genus Psyllaephagus.			
Anagyrus mazzinini Girault, 1915	Wasp	Giuseppe Mazzini	Subsequently transferred to genus Psyllaephagus.			
Anatoma tobeyoides Geiger & Jansen, 2004	Sea snail	Mark Tobey	"The sculpture of fine, irregularly intersecting lines is reminiscent of the paintings of Mark Tobey."			
Anauchen jokaii Gojšina & Páll-Gergely, 2025	Snail	Mór Jókai	"This species is named after and dedicated to Mór Jókai (1825–1904), Hungarian novelist, dramatist, to commemorate the bicentenary of his birth. Jókai was interested in malacology, he had a large collection of (mostly marine) shells, and even published a satirical novel entitled "Novel of snails" (A csigák regénye)."			
Anauchen picasso Gojšina & Páll-Gergely, 2025	Snail	Pablo Picasso	"This species looks like an Anauchen with rounded whorls painted in a Pablo Picasso style (i.e., resembling the art style known as Cubism)."			
Anolis roosevelti Grant, 1931	Lizard	Theodore Roosevelt Jr.	This possibly extinct species is native to the Spanish Virgin Islands, part of the Commonwealth of Puerto Rico, where Theodore Roosevelt Jr. was governor at the time of its naming.			
Anophthalmus hitleri Scheibel, 1933	Beetle	Adolf Hitler	Hitler sent Scheibel a letter showing his gratitude for naming a species after him. This blind, troglobiont beetle, found only in five caves in Slovenia, is now in danger of extinction solely because of its name, due to its interest to collectors of Nazi memorabilia. After World War II, renaming the beetle was rejected by the ICZN, as the name had been originally published in accordance with ICZN rules.			
Anostirus ataturki Platia & Gudenzi, 2000	Beetle	Mustafa Kemal Atatürk	"The name of the new species pays tribute to Kemal Ataturk, the founding father of the modern Turkish republic; Atatürk University in Erzurum, where the specimens are deposited, is named after him."			
Antarctanax shackletoni † Peecook, Smith & Sidor, 2018	Archosauriform	Ernest Shackleton	A fossil reptile from the Triassic of Antarctica, named "in reference to British polar explorer Ernest Shackleton, who named the Beardmore Glacier, which runs between lower Fremouw localities such as Graphite Peak." (the type locality)			
Antarctophiline amundseni Moles, Avila & Malaquias, 2019	Sea slug	Roald Amundsen	A species found in the Weddell Sea (Antarctica), "named after the Norwegian explorer Roald Amundsen who was the first to reach 90°0'S, the South Pole, on 14 December 1911."			
Anthemis regis-borisii Stoj. & Acht.	Flowering plant	Boris III of Bulgaria	A species of dog-fennel endemic to Bulgaria, described during Tsar Boris III's reign and named in his honour.			
Aphanogmus mangimelii Salden & Peters, 2023	Wasp	Mangi Meli	A ceraphronid wasp from Tanzania, "named in honour of Chief Mangi Meli (1866–1900), who was the leader of the WaChagga and fought against German colonialists and was brutally executed in 1900."			
Apleurotropis thaelmanni Girault, 1934	Wasp	Ernst Thälmann	"To a persecuted German."			
Apogonia rizali Heller, 1897	Beetle	José Rizal	"José Rizal, born in Luzon of Tagalog parents, studied in Manila, Madrid, Leipzig, Berlin, Paris, London and Brussels and has made an excellent name for himself as a writer in various fields, as a doctor and artist. Living in political exile in Mindanao, he spent years collecting for the Dresden Museum. On 30 November 1896, he gave his young life for his personal and patriotic ideals. He was summarily shot by the Spanish in Manila." This was one of the species Rizal collected.			
Aptostichus dorothealangeae Bond, 2012	Spider	Dorothea Lange	Found in California's agricultural Central Valley			
Aptostichus muiri Bond, 2012	Spider	John Muir	The species occurs in Yosemite National Park, which Muir was instrumental in founding			
Aquila adalberti C.L. Brehm, 1861	Eagle	Prince Adalbert of Bavaria (1828–1875)	The Spanish imperial eagle is endemic to the Iberian Peninsula. Specimens were first collected by Reinhold Brehm, a German doctor and naturalist who had settled in Spain, and who sent them to his father, renowned ornithologist Christian Ludwig Brehm, to write the formal description as a new species. Reinhold Brehm chose to dedicate it to Prince Adalbert of Bavaria, who had appointed him as his ophthalmologist, as a token of gratitude and friendship (like Brehm, the prince had a Spanish wife, Infanta Amalia of Spain, and spent much of his time in Spain).			
Araphuroides sala Błażewicz-Paszkowycz & Bamber, 2012	Crustacean	George Augustus Sala	A tanaid from Bass Strait, Australia, "Named after the English journalist George Augustus Henry Sala who, during a visit to Victoria in 1885, coined the phrase "Marvellous Melbourne", which stuck long into the twentieth century and is apparently still used today by Melburnians."			
Arcticlam nanseni † Marincovich, 1993	Bivalve	Fridtjof Nansen	A fossil species of clam from the Paleocene of Prince Creek Formation in Arctic Alaska, "named in honor of Fridtjof Nansen, who was the first to scientifically explore and study the Arctic Ocean."			
Arctitreta pearyi † Whitfield, 1908	Brachiopod	Robert Peary	A fossil species from the Carboniferous of Ellesmere Island, described from specimens collected by members of Peary's 1905–1906 expedition.			
Aristostomias grimaldii Zugmayer, 1913	Fish	Albert I, Prince of Monaco	The prince was born Albert Grimaldi. This species of barbeled dragonfish was described from specimens collected by one of the prince's research yachts, the Hirondelle II.			
Arlesminthurus franzkafkai Palacios-Vargas & Cabrera, 2015	Springtail	Franz Kafka	"The new species is dedicated to the Czech writer Franz Kafka in the century [sic] of the publication of his novel: The metamorphoses [sic]."			
Artedidraco shackletoni Waite, 1911	Fish	Ernest Shackleton	A species native to the Southern Ocean, described from specimens collected at Cape Royds by the Nimrod Expedition, led by Shackleton.			
Arthromachus binghami Hoffman, 1987	Millipede	Hiram Bingham III	"named in memory of HIRAM BINGHAM, who "rediscovered" the ruins of Machu Picchu [the type locality] in 1911."			
Arthurdactylus conandoylei † Frey & Martill, 1994	Pterosaur	Arthur Conan Doyle	Found in jungle similar to where The Lost World was set.			
Ascogaster lovelaceae Kittel, 2016	Wasp	Ada Lovelace	Replacement name for Ascogaster breviventris Tobias, 2000, which was preoccupied by Ascogaster breviventris Granger, 1949.			
Asterope grimaldi Skogsberg, 1920	Crustacean	Albert I, Prince of Monaco	The prince was born Albert Grimaldi. The type locality of this ostracod is the Monaco harbour. Subsequently transferred to genus Cylindroleberis.			
Astrarchia stephaniae Finsch & A.B. Meyer, 1885	Bird	Princess Stéphanie of Belgium	Genus Astrarchia was subsequently synonymised with Astrapia.			
Astrophiura cavellae Koehler, 1915	Brittle star	Edith Cavell	"I respectfully dedicate this species to the memory of Miss Edith Cavell, in the certainty that scholars in all civilised countries will appreciate this gesture of sympathy to the noble woman who was the victim of a cowardly and revolting act." The description was published a few weeks after Cavell's execution. Subsequently synonymised with Astrophiura permira.			
Atalopedes nabokovi E.L. Bell & Comstock, 1948	Butterfly	Vladimir Nabokov	A skipper from Hispaniola described from a specimen that was sent to the authors by Nabokov. Subsequently transferred to genus Hesperia.			
Atoposoma arnoldi Girault, 1913	Wasp	Matthew Arnold	Subsequently transferred to the genus Cirrospilus.			
Atoposoma gregi Girault, 1913	Wasp	William Rathbone Greg	Subsequently transferred to the genus Cirrospilus.			
Atoposoma lanei Girault, 1913	Wasp	Norman Angell	"Dedicated to Ralph Lane for his book The Great Illusion, A Study of the Relation of Military Power in Nations to their Economic and Social Advantage." Angell's full name was Ralph Norman Angell Lane, and he had sometimes published under the name Ralph Lane. This species was subsequently transferred to the genus Cirrospilus.			
Atoposoma mazzinini Girault, 1913	Wasp	Giuseppe Mazzini	Subsequently transferred to the genus Cirrospilus.			
Atoposoma zolai Girault, 1913	Wasp	Émile Zola	"This magnificent species I dedicate with great respect to Émile Zola for his work La Débâcle"; Subsequently transferred to the genus Cirrospilus.			
Austrotinodes santosdumonti Dumas, de Souza & Rocha, 2017	Caddisfly	Alberto Santos-Dumont	"Dedicated to the Brazilian inventor Alberto Santos Dumont, who was born at Palmira (now Santos Dumont) in Minas Gerais state in 1873 and died in 1932. Santos Dumont is considered the "Father of Flight" and "Aviation Pioneer" because he invented the first true airplane called 14-BIS, which flew a distance of 220 meters at a height of 6 meters and at a speed of about 40 km/h, in Paris on November 12, 1906." This species is native to Brazil.			
Axylus mabinii Tan et al., 2018	Katydid	Apolinario Mabini	This species, endemic to the Philippines, "is named after Apolinario Mabini y Maranan (1864–1903), a Filipino revolutionary leader and hero who confronted both the Spanish and American colonial rules."			
Baeturia hardyi De Boer, 1986	Cicada	Oliver Hardy	Two species in this genus "were named after the two American film comics: Stan Laurel and Oliver Hardy. Without their films, who could face days of staring through the microscope at dead cicadas? Furthermore, Mr. Hardy's favourite line: "there's another nice mess you've gotten me into" frequently leaps to the mind when studying the species of the genus Baeturia."			
Baeturia laureli De Boer, 1986	Cicada	Stan Laurel	Two species in this genus "were named after the two American film comics: Stan Laurel and Oliver Hardy. Without their films, who could face days of staring through the microscope at dead cicadas? Furthermore, Mr. Hardy's favourite line: "there's another nice mess you've gotten me into" frequently leaps to the mind when studying the species of the genus Baeturia."			
Bagheera kiplingi Peckham & Peckham, 1896	Spider	Rudyard Kipling	The genus name is derived from Bagheera, the black panther from Kipling's Jungle Book with the species name honoring Kipling himself.			
Barapasaurus tagorei † Jain, Kutty, Roy-Chowdhury & Chatterjee, 1975	Dinosaur	Rabindranath Tagore	A sauropod from the Jurassic Kota Formation in India; its first excavation "was carried out in the centenary year of one of India's most famous poets, Rabindranath Tagore, and named in his memory."			
Bathytroctes grimaldii Zugmayer, 1911	Fish	Albert I, Prince of Monaco	The prince was born Albert Grimaldi. This species of slickhead was described from specimens collected by one of the prince's research yachts, the Princesse Alice. Subsequently synonymised with Bathytroctes microlepis.			
Becquerelia (insect) † Brongniart, 1893	Palaeodictyoptera, an extinct order of insects	Henri Becquerel	64 years after botanist Adolphe Brongniart named the plant genus Becquerelia after scientist Antoine César Becquerel (see List of organisms named after famous people (born before 1800)), his grandson, paleoentomologist Charles Brongniart, named this fossil insect genus from the Carboniferous period after Antoine César Becquerel's grandson, physicist (and future Nobel Prize laureate) Henri Becquerel.			
Beethovenia brahmsi † García-Alcalde, 2015	Brachiopod	Johannes Brahms	A fossil species from the Devonian of Northern Spain. "Dedicated to the eminent German composer Johannes Brahms for his unshakable romanticism in an era of drastic symphonic changes." The genus Beethovenia, named after Ludwig van Beethoven, was created concurrently (see List of organisms named after famous people (born before 1800)).			
Belonogaster menelikii Gribodo, 1879	Wasp	Menelik II	Described from two specimens collected in Shewa (Ethiopian Empire), where Menelik was Negus at the time.			
Bhambathorhynchus Willems & Artois, 2017	Flatworm	Bhambatha	A genus of worms from KwaZulu-Natal, South Africa "dedicated to Bhambatha kaMancinza (ca. 1860–1906?), a Zulu chief of the amaZondi clan in present-day KwaZulu-Natal, famous for his role in an armed rebellion against the British."			
Biemma grimaldii Topsent, 1890	Sponge	Albert I, Prince of Monaco	The prince was born Albert Grimaldi. This species was described from specimens collected by one of the prince's research yachts, the Hirondelle. Subsequently transferred to genus Desmacella.			
Bismarckia Hildebr. & H.Wendl.	Palm	Otto von Bismarck	A monotypic genus of palms endemic to Madagascar but cultivated worldwide, described by German botanists in the 19th century.			
Blancoa Huber, 2000	Spider	Andrés Eloy Blanco	"The generic name honors the Venezuelan poet Andrés Eloy Blanco, author of Angelitos Negros."			
Bonnetina julesvernei Ortiz & Francke, 2017	Spider	Jules Verne	"in honour of Jules Verne (1828–1905), a French writer who is considered by many as the Father of science fiction. His tens of novels on travel, discovery, invention and history have inspired millions of children and teenagers worldwide (including both authors of this study) with his thirst for knowledge and discovery."			
Borgesminthurinus Palacios-Vargas, 2020	Springtail	Jorge Luis Borges	"The new genus is dedicated to Jorge Luis Borges [...], the Argentinean writer, author of the Manual of Fantastic Zoology, which included spherical animals as Symphypleona are."			
Borrowella Girault, 1923	Wasp	George Borrow				
Bothriurus mistral Ojanguren-Affilastro, Mattoni, Alfaro & Pizarro-Araya, 2023	Scorpion	Gabriela Mistral	"referring to Gabriela Mistral, pseudonym of the Chilean poetess Lucila María Godoy Alcayaga (1889–1957), who was born in Vicuña and raised in Monte Grande, both in the Elqui valley (Coquimbo Region), an area adjacent to the type locality of this species."			
Boudiennyia Girault, 1937	Wasp	Semyon Budyonny	"Dedicated to a hero."			
Bristowia gandhii Kanesharatnam & Benjamin, 2016	Spider	Mahatma Gandhi	A jumping spider native to India and Sri Lanka, "named for Mohandas Karamchand Gandhi (1869–1948). He was the pre-eminent leader of the Indian Independence Movement in British-ruled India, eventually paving the way for independence of Sri Lanka as well."			
Buliminus roosevelti Dall, 1910	Snail	Theodore Roosevelt	This African species was described from specimens collected by the Smithsonian–Roosevelt African expedition and named after its leader. Subsequently transferred to genus Cerastus.			
Burmomiles blixenae † Fanti & Damgaard, 2019	Beetle	Karen Blixen	A fossil soldier beetle found in Cretaceous Burmese amber. "In memory of the Danish author and writer Karen Christenze von Blixen-Finecke (born Dinesen; 17 April 1885 - 7 September 1962). [Dedication] that the actress Ghita Nørby suggested to us." (the authors had previously named another beetle after Nørby).			
Buthus garcialorcai Teruel & Turiel, 2020	Scorpion	Federico García Lorca	"a patronym honoring the great Spanish poet and dramatist Federico García Lorca (5/June/1898 – 18/August/1936). Born in Granada, as a member of the Generation of '27 he became the greatest 20th century poet in Spain and one of the best dramatists and prose writers as well. Because of political reasons, during the Spanish Civil War he was assassinated by a fascist Falangist firing squad precisely at the type locality of the new species."			
Caconeura theebawi Fraser, 1922	Damselfly	Thibaw Min	This species was described from specimens collected in Burma. Subsequently transferred to genus Prodasineura.			
Caligophryne doylei Fouquet et al., 2023	Frog	Arthur Conan Doyle	This species is known only from the Neblina massif, Pantepui, northeastern South America, and named "honoring Sir Arthur Conan Doyle for his influential novel The Lost World, in which he depicted ancient creatures surviving until the present era on the isolated summit of a remote table-top mountain, like the frog we describe here."			
Calliostoma grimaldii Dautzenberg & Fischer, 1896	Sea snail	Albert I, Prince of Monaco	The prince was born Albert Grimaldi. This species was described from specimens collected by one of the prince's research yachts, the Hirondelle.			
Callyspongia roosevelti van Soest, Kaiser & Van Syoc, 2011	Sponge	Franklin D. Roosevelt	"Named after President Franklin D. Roosevelt, who facilitated the 1938 cruise to Île Clipperton which allowed W.L. Schmitt to collect the first specimen of the new species."			
Calometopidius cavellae Bourgoin, 1917	Beetle	Edith Cavell	"One of these two species is dedicated to the memory of the passengers on the Lusitania [Calometopus lusitaniae, described in the same paper], the other to the memory of Miss Edith Cavell, victims of German barbarism."			
Calvarium mercieri Pic, 1918	Beetle	Désiré-Joseph Mercier	The description of this species was published in France amid the celebrations for the Armistice of 11 November 1918, end of the hostilities of World War I, in which Mercier was noted for his staunch resistance to the German occupation; "It is not without emotion that I have written, in the form of a Gabonese insect, the name of a venerated and energetic prelate who was the soul of the resistance of an unfortunate oppressed people". The genus Calvarium was created concurrently as "a discreet and sad tribute to those who have suffered in exile, to those who are still suffering, stricken by cruel bereavement, and especially to the mothers and widows who have suffered in their dearest affections".			
Calyx shackletoni Goodwin, Brewin & Brickle, 2012	Sponge	Ernest Shackleton	"Named, in recognition of its probable pan-Antarctic presence, after Sir Ernest Shackleton, polar explorer, and also for the Shackleton Scholarship Fund, which supported this work."			
Cambarincola osceola Hoffman, 1963	Branchiobdellid worm	Osceola	"named for the Seminole Chief Osceola, a heroic leader of the resistance of his people during their conflict with the United States Government." This worm is native to the original lands of the Seminole, among other areas. The specific name was subsequently amended to osceolai.			
Campephaga sloetii Schlegel, 1866	Bird	Ludolph Anne Jan Wilt Sloet van de Beele	"This species bears the name of His Excellency Baron Sloet van de Beële, Governor-General of the Dutch possessions in the East Indies, a name dear to the sciences, since it belongs to a man of integrity and learning who, in the midst of the high functions he exercises, has taken pleasure in favouring with all his power the progress of human knowledge, and in remembering his fellow members of the Academy of Sciences, among whom he will, we hope, take his place again after his return from the Indies."; Subsequently transferred to genus Campochaera.			
Campsicnemus charliechaplini Evenhuis, 1996	Fly	Charlie Chaplin	"This species is named in honor of the great silent movie comedian, Charlie Chaplin, because of the curious tendency of this fly to die with its midlegs in a bandy-legged position."			
Campsicnemus iii Evenhuis, 2011	Fly	John Papa ʻĪʻī	"The specific epithet honors John Papa i'i (1800–1870), leading citizen of the Hawaiian kingdom during the 19th century when he was attendant to king Kamehameha II and close associate of many rulers of Hawaiʻi. One of his great-greatgrandsons is my good friend and colleague in Hawaiian history, DeSoto Brown, collection manager of the Bishop Museum Archives [where the specimens are stored]." This species is endemic to Hawaiʻi.			
Cannopilus picassoi † H.Stradner 1961	Alga	Pablo Picasso	A fossil Dictyochophyceae algae from the late Cenozoic. It has since been transferred to genus Caryocha or Halicalyptra (sources vary).			
Carapoia nairae Huber, 2016	Spider	Nair de Teffé	A cellar spider from Brazil.			
Cardiodactylus rizali Robillard, 2014	Cricket	José Rizal	"Named after Jose Rizal, the national hero of the Philippines who was exiled in the city of Dapitan." (The type locality)			
Carnegia Holland, 1896	Moth	Andrew Carnegie	"I take pleasure in dedicating the genus [...] to my honored friend, Mr. Andrew Carnegie, whose recent gift of a million of dollars, the income there from to be annually expended in the purchase of works of art and collections for the Art Gallery and Museum, which he has founded in the city of Pittsburgh, well entitles him to be regarded as one of the foremost promoters of science in this country."			
Carnegiea Britton & Rose	Cactus	Andrew Carnegie				
Cerambyx cerdo masaryki Vartanis, 2018	Beetle	Tomáš Masaryk	A subspecies of the great capricorn beetle from Bulgaria, described by a Czech researcher.			
Ceraphron aguinaldoi Dessart, 1981	Wasp	Emilio Aguinaldo	This species is native to Luzon, birthplace of Aguinaldo.			
Cerapterocerus emersoni Girault, 1915	Wasp	Ralph Waldo Emerson				
Ceratoneuronomyia arnoldi Girault, 1913	Wasp	Matthew Arnold	Genus Ceratoneuronomyia was subsequently synonymised with Tetrastichus.			
Ceratoneuropsis poincarei Girault, 1913	Wasp	Henri Poincaré				
Ceratozamia zaragozae Medellín	Cycad	Ignacio Zaragoza	A species endemic to Mexico and "dedicated to General Ignacio Zaragoza at the first Centennial of his glorious deeds in defense of the national sovereignty."			
Ceroptres dandoi Nastasi, Smith & Davis, 2024	Wasp	Edward Dando	"Named for Edward Dando, a famed food thief in 19th century Britain who is credited with consuming massive quantities of oysters and refusing to pay for them, declaring that he "refuse[d] to starve in a land of plenty". We find this name to be especially apt for this species, as we reared C. dandoi from galls of Neuroterus tantalus [sic; correct species name is tantulus] which superficially resemble the shells of some mollusks, evidently Dando's favorite food."			
Cervalces roosevelti † Hay, 1913	Deer	Theodore Roosevelt	A fossil species from the Pleistocene of Iowa, US, "named in honor of Colonel Theodore Roosevelt, in recognition of his services in [sic] behalf of the natural history of mammals, and especially in recognition of his contributions to a knowledge of Alces americanus, the American Moose, the living representative of the animal here described." Subsequently synonymised with Cervalces scotti.			
Cervus roosevelti Merriam, 1897	Deer	Theodore Roosevelt	Subsequently demoted to subspecies status, as Cervus canadensis roosevelti.			
Chaenusa trumani Kula, 2008	Wasp	Harry S. Truman				
Chaetozone shackletoni Blake, 2018	Polychaete worm	Ernest Shackleton	A marine species from the Southern Ocean, "named in honor of Sir Ernest Shackleton (1874–1922), Antarctic explorer of the Heroic Age, whose Imperial Trans-Antarctic Expedition (1914–1917) was curtailed by ice in the Weddell Sea, resulting in his ship HMS Endurance being trapped, eventually crushed, and sunk, leaving all hands with few options for survival. Shackleton, however, organized the crew and after hauling their life boats across the ice to open water, they eventually landed on Elephant Island. There being no hope for rescue, Shackleton led a small crew on his now-famous boat journey to South Georgia where eventually, after a trek over the mountains from the southern to northern side of the island to the whaling station at Grytviken, he was able to find a vessel, return, and rescue his crew with no loss of life. Years later, while on another expedition, he died on 5 Jan 1922 on South Georgia where he was buried."			
Charcotia amundseni D'Udekem D'Acoz, Schön & Robert, 2018	Crustacean	Roald Amundsen	A species of amphipod found off the coast of Antarctica, "dedicated to the memory of Roald Amundsen, conqueror of the South Pole and first mate on the RV Belgica during the historical Belgian Antarctic Expedition." (The discoverers of this species are Belgian.)			
Cheiracanthium tagorei Biswas & Raychaudhuri, 2003	Spider	Rabindranath Tagore	A species of yellow sac spider native to Bangladesh.			
Chipetaia † Rasmussen, 1996	Primate	Chipeta	Named after chief Ouray's wife as a reference to its relation to Ourayia, both being fossil omomyid primates from the Uinta Formation. Ourayia, however, was named after the town of Ouray, Utah (which is in turn named after chief Ouray).			
Chirostoma diazi Jordan & Snyder, 1899	Fish	Porfirio Díaz	"Named for Porfirio Díaz, the honored President of the Republic of Mexico, in recognition of his interest in the progress of science." Subsequently synonymized with Chirostoma sphyraena.			
Chiroteuthis grimaldii Joubin, 1895	Squid	Albert I, Prince of Monaco	The prince was born Albert Grimaldi. This species was described from specimens collected by one of the prince's research yachts, the Hirondelle. Subsequently transferred to genus Mastigoteuthis.			
Chlorocytus papahemii Tselikh & Li, 2026	Wasp	Ernest Hemingway				
Chlorophorus clemenceaui Pic, 1918	Beetle	Georges Clemenceau	The description of this species was published in France amid the celebrations for the Armistice of 11 November 1918, end of the hostilities of World War I, in which Clemenceau was an important figure.			
Chrysocharis dumasi Girault, 1915	Wasp	Alexandre Dumas	Subsequently transferred to genus Chrysonotomyia.			
Chrysolina pascolii Bieńkowski, 2024	Beetle	Giovanni Pascoli	A leaf beetle native to Sichuan, China, "named after Giovanni Pascoli (1855–1912), an Italian poet. The name for this species was suggested by my friend M. Daccordi, who presented me the type specimens."			
Chrysopilus kafkai Cegolin & Santos, 2020	Fly	Franz Kafka	"Based on its general dark color, the species is named after the fiction author Franz Kafka, whose literature mostly deals with the darkness and absurdity of human behavior."			
Chrysopophagus mazzinini Girault, 1915	Wasp	Giuseppe Mazzini	Subsequently transferred to genus Cheiloneurus.			
Chrysymenia oliverhardyi Arakaki, W.E.Schmidt & Fredericq	Red alga	Oliver Hardy	These two species from the Gulf of Mexico are closely related, but C. oliverhardyi is a "broadly foliose species", while C. stanlaureli is a "slender, branched species".			
Chrysymenia stanlaureli W.E.Schmidt, Arakaki and Fredericq	Red alga	Stan Laurel	These two species from the Gulf of Mexico are closely related, but C. oliverhardyi is a "broadly foliose species", while C. stanlaureli is a "slender, branched species".			
Cirratulus alfonsinae Saracho-Bottero & Elías, 2019	Polychaete worm	Alfonsina Storni	A species from the coasts of Argentina, "dedicated to Alfonsina Storni (1892-1938). She was a teacher and was a poet, and her prose was feminist. Critics attribute [her] an originality that changed the meaning of Latin American lyrics. She had breast cancer and chose suicide. She threw herself from the breakwater of the Club Argentino de Mujeres, from the city of Mar del Plata, although a song dedicated in her honor portrayed her slowly entering the sea."			
Cirroteuthis grimaldii Joubin, 1903	Octopus	Albert I, Prince of Monaco	The prince was born Albert Grimaldi. This species was described from specimens collected by one of the prince's research yachts, the Princesse Alice. Subsequently transferred to genus Opisthoteuthis.			
Cixius lermontovi Gnezdilov, 2018	Planthopper	Mikhail Lermontov	"The species is named in honour of the famous Russian poet Mikhail Yur'evich Lermontov (1814–1841) who was lieutenant of Tenginsky infantry regiment deployed in 1839 in the mouth of Shapsukho River – not so far from the type locality of the species described."			
Cladorhiza grimaldii Topsent, 1909	Sponge	Albert I, Prince of Monaco	The prince was born Albert Grimaldi. This species was described from specimens collected by one of the prince's research yachts, the Princesse Alice. Subsequently transferred to genus Nullarbora.			
Clepsydra truganiniae Vyverman et al.	Diatom	Truganini	This species is endemic to lakes of Tasmania.			
Closterocerus curtisi Girault, 1915	Wasp	George William Curtis				
Closterocerus rostandi Girault, 1915	Wasp	Edmond Rostand				
Closterocerus zangwilli Girault, 1913	Wasp	Israel Zangwill	"Dedicated to Israel Zangwill for his tragedy The War God."			
Cnemaspis vangoghi Khandekar, Thackeray & Agarwal, 2024	Lizard	Vincent van Gogh	"The colouration of the new species is reminiscent of one of van Gogh's most iconic paintings, The Starry Night."			
Cnesterodon carnegiei Haseman, 1911	Fish	Andrew Carnegie	A killifish from Iguazu River, collected by the expedition of the Carnegie Museum to central South America, 1907-10.			
Cobitis aliyeae Freyhof, Bayçelebi & Geiger, 2018	Fish	Fatma Aliye Topuz	A species of loach from Turkey.			
Coccidoxenus wundti Girault, 1915	Wasp	Wilhelm Wundt	Subsequently transferred to genus Psyllaephagus.			
Coccophagus thoreauini Girault, 1915	Wasp	Henry David Thoreau	Subsequently transferred to genus Encarsia.			
Colanthura gauguini Müller, 1993	Crustacean	Paul Gauguin	An isopod found in Mo'orea, French Polynesia, "named for the artist Paul Gauguin, who was one of the earliest French impressionists [sic; he was actually a post-impressionist], living for several years in French Polynesia."			
Collastoma anderseni Roehl, 2017	Flatworm	Hans Christian Andersen				
Colletes gandhi Kuhlmann, 2003	Bee	Mahatma Gandhi	This species is native to India.			
Compsodactylus vallejoi Figueroa & Neita-Moreno, 2019	Beetle	César Vallejo	A species from Peru named "in honor of the great poet and writer Cesar Vallejo, born in La Libertad Department." (where the specimens were collected)			
Conus cakobaui Moolenbeek, Röckel & Bouchet, 2008	Sea snail	Seru Epenisa Cakobau	A cone snail from the waters of Fiji and Tonga, "Named after Seru Epenisa Cakobau, warlord of the 'Cannibal Islands'; in 1871, he brought for the first time under his rule what today constitutes the Fiji Islands."; Subsequently transferred to genus Profundiconus.			
Conus garrisoni † Hendricks, 2015	Sea snail	William Lloyd Garrison	A fossil species from the Miocene of the Dominican Republic.			
Conus gauguini Richard & Salvat, 1973	Sea snail	Paul Gauguin	This species is native to Tahiti and the Marquesas Islands, where Gauguin spent most of the last years of his life and produced his most famous works.			
Conus rizali Olivera & Biggs, 2010	Sea snail	José Rizal	A species of cone snail endemic to the Philippines, "named in honor of José Rizal, the National Hero of the Philippines. Dr. Rizal, who was executed by the Spanish Colonial Administration in 1898, collected shells as a hobby."			
Corynebacterium curieae Cappelli et al., 2023	Bacterium	Marie Curie				
Corynebacterium lehmanniae Cappelli et al., 2023	Bacterium	Inge Lehmann				
Corynebacterium marquesiae Cappelli et al., 2023	Bacterium	Branca Edmée Marques				
Corynebacterium meitnerae Cappelli et al., 2023	Bacterium	Lise Meitner				
Cosmocomoidea renani Girault, 1913	Wasp	Ernest Renan	Subsequently transferred to genus Lymaenon.			
Crambus bellinii Bassi, 2014	Moth	Vincenzo Bellini				
Crambus berliozi Bassi, 2012	Moth	Hector Berlioz				
Crax alberti Fraser, 1850	Fowl	Albert, Prince Consort	The blue-billed curassow, endemic to Colombia. "A new and beautiful species of a limited family like the Curassows must be looked upon as a valuable addition to our stock of ornithological acquaintances, and deserving of a distinguished cognomen. I therefore propose to name it after Her Most Gracious Majesty's illustrious consort, His Royal Highness Prince Albert, forming at the same time a companion to my Goura victoria" (also in this list, under its protonym Lophyrus victoria)			
Cremastobaeus boolei Veenakumari, 2017	Wasp	George Boole				
Cremnops witkopegasus Tucker, Chapman & Sharkey, 2015	Wasp	Crazy Horse	"Named for Crazy Horse, the Native American war leader of the Lakota people. Witko means crazy in the Lakota language and a Pegasus is a winged horse."			
Cricula gandhii Naumann & Löffler, 2013	Moth	Mahatma Gandhi	"The type series of C. gandhii sp. n. was part of the type series of the earlier described C. aungsansuukyiae, dedicated to Aung San Suu Kyi, human rights activist in Myanmar [see List of organisms named after famous people (born 1925–1949)] [...]. As the Indian specimens are now described as separate species, we choose in "good tradition" as name patron for the here described similar taxon the famous Indian pacifist Mohandas Karamchand Gandhi, known as Mahatma Gandhi."			
Crisia grimaldii Calvet, 1911	Bryozoan	Albert I, Prince of Monaco	The prince was born Albert Grimaldi. This species was described from specimens collected by one of the prince's research yachts, the Princesse Alice.			
Cristatithorax hugoi Girault, 1915	Wasp	Victor Hugo	Subsequently transferred to genus Cheiloneurus			
Crocidosema nitsugai Vargas, 2019	Moth	Agustín Barrios	"dedicated to the memory of the great Paraguayan guitarist and composer Agustín Pío Barrios, also known as Nitsuga Mangoré, as an acknowledgement to his amazing musical contribution."			
Ctenomys fochi Thomas, 1919	Rodent	Ferdinand Foch	"Named in honour of Gen. Foch, by whose genius victory in the recent great struggle has been so greatly accelerated."			
Ctenomys haigi Thomas, 1919	Rodent	Douglas Haig, 1st Earl Haig	This species was described shortly after the end of World War I and "Named in honour of General Sir Douglas Haig, Commander-in-Chief of the British armies."			
Culex rizali C.S. Banks, 1906	Mosquito	José Rizal	This mosquito is endemic to the Philippines; "I dedicate this beautiful species to the memory of Dr. José Rizal y Mercado in recognition of his work as the first Filipino scientist." Subsequently transferred to genus Aedes.			
Cyclocephala freudi Endrödi, 1963	Beetle	Sigmund Freud				
Cyclocephala rorschachoides Ratcliffe, 1992	Beetle	Hermann Rorschach				
Cyerce liliuokalaniae Moreno et al., 2025	Sea slug	Liliʻuokalani	This species is native to Hawaiʻi and is "Named in honour of Lydia Liliʻu Loloku Walania Kamakaʻeha, Queen Liliʻuokalani, the last sovereign monarch of Ke Aupuni Hawaiʻi (the Kingdom of Hawaiʻi) until her overthrow by the US Government on January 17, 1893."			
Cylindroiulus julesvernei Reboleira & Enghoff, 2014	Millipede	Jules Verne	"The new species is dedicated to French author Jules Vernes [sic] (1828–1905) on the occasion of the 150th anniversary of the publication of his inspirational book Voyage au centre de la Terre (Journey to the Center of the Earth)." This is a troglobiont species known only from the São Vicente Caves in Madeira, Portugal.			
Cymodoce delvarii Khalaji-Pirbalouty, Bruce & Wägele, 2013	Crustacean	Rais-Ali Delvari	A seapill described from specimens collected from the Iranian coast of the Persian Gulf.			
Cyphochilus gandhii Sabatinelli, 2020	Beetle	Mahatma Gandhi	"Mohandas Karamchand Gandhi was an Indian lawyer and political ethicist who employed nonviolent resistance to lead the successful campaign for India's independence from British Rule and in turn inspired movements for civil rights and freedom across the World."; This species is native to India.			
Cyphon alberti Pic, 1918	Beetle	Albert I of Belgium	The description of this species was published in France amid the celebrations for the Armistice of 11 November 1918, end of the hostilities of World War I, in which Albert I was an important figure. Subsequently transferred to genus Brachycyphon.			
Cyphon albriecii Pic, 1918	Beetle	Alberico Albricci	The description of this species was published in France amid the celebrations for the Armistice of 11 November 1918, end of the hostilities of World War I, in which Albricci was a significant figure. Subsequently transferred to genus Contacyphon.			
Cyphon aymerichi Pic, 1918	Beetle	Joseph Gaudérique Aymerich	The description of this species was published in France amid the celebrations for the Armistice of 11 November 1918, end of the hostilities of World War I, in which Aymerich was a significant figure. Subsequently transferred to genus Brachycyphon.			
Cyphon cadornai Pic, 1918	Beetle	Luigi Cadorna	The description of this species was published in France amid the celebrations for the Armistice of 11 November 1918, end of the hostilities of World War I, in which Cadorna was an important figure. Subsequently transferred to genus Contacyphon.			
Cyphon debeneyi Pic, 1918	Beetle	Marie Eugène Debeney	The description of this species was published in France amid the celebrations for the Armistice of 11 November 1918, end of the hostilities of World War I, in which Debeney was an important figure. Subsequently transferred to genus Contacyphon.			
Cyphon degouttei Pic, 1918	Beetle	Jean-Marie Degoutte	The description of this species was published in France amid the celebrations for the Armistice of 11 November 1918, end of the hostilities of World War I, in which Degoutte was a significant figure. Subsequently transferred to genus Contacyphon.			
Cyphon (Dermestocyphon) beattyi Pic, 1918	Beetle	David Beatty, 1st Earl Beatty	The description of this species was published in France amid the celebrations for the Armistice of 11 November 1918, end of the hostilities of World War I, in which Beatty was an important figure. Subsequently transferred to genus Yoshitomia.			
Cyphon (Dermestocyphon) drianti Pic, 1918	Beetle	Émile Driant	The description of this species was published in France amid the celebrations for the Armistice of 11 November 1918, end of the hostilities of World War I, in which Driant had been killed becoming a national hero. "The dead, who also had beautiful patriotic gestures, or who seem to us to deserve a contributory part in the final victory, will not be forgotten. C. Drianti, with the lamented name of a great patriot (ab uno disce omnes), will recall, as is my wish, the immortal memory of the elite phalanx of the "fallen in the field of honour"." Subgenus Dermestocyphon, created concurrently, was later promoted to genus level.			
Cyphon diazi Pic, 1918	Beetle	Armando Diaz	The description of this species was published in France amid the celebrations for the Armistice of 11 November 1918, end of the hostilities of World War I, in which Diaz was an important figure. Subsequently transferred to genus Contacyphon.			
Cyphon espereyi Pic, 1918	Beetle	Louis Franchet d'Espèrey	The description of this species was published in France amid the celebrations for the Armistice of 11 November 1918, end of the hostilities of World War I, in which Franchet d'Espèrey was a significant figure. Subsequently transferred to genus Contacyphon.			
Cyphon foncki Pic, 1918	Beetle	René Fonck	The description of this species was published in France amid the celebrations for the Armistice of 11 November 1918, end of the hostilities of World War I, in which Fonck was a notable participant, having become the "Allied Ace of Aces". "Under the name of Foncki, I pay tribute to the superior merit of the entire air force: to the rare survivors of the winged army, to the many youths cut down before their time." Subsequently transferred to genus Calvarium.			
Cyphon gabrieli Pic, 1918	Beetle	Gabriele D'Annunzio	The description of this species was published in France amid the celebrations for the Armistice of 11 November 1918, end of the hostilities of World War I, in which D'Annunzio was a notable participant. "I celebrate one of the living forces that contributed to changing the beautiful dream of "the greater Italy" into a touching reality". Subsequently transferred to genus Contacyphon.			
Cyphon garibaldii Pic, 1918	Beetle	Giuseppe Garibaldi II	The description of this species was published in France amid the celebrations for the Armistice of 11 November 1918, end of the hostilities of World War I, in which Peppino Garibaldi was a notable participant. Subsequently transferred to genus Contacyphon.			
Cyphon gouraudi Pic, 1918	Beetle	Henri Gouraud	The description of this species was published in France amid the celebrations for the Armistice of 11 November 1918, end of the hostilities of World War I, in which Gouraud was an important figure. Subsequently transferred to genus Contacyphon.			
Cyphon halleri Pic, 1918	Beetle	Józef Haller	The description of this species was published in France amid the celebrations for the Armistice of 11 November 1918, end of the hostilities of World War I, in which Haller was an important figure. Subsequently transferred to genus Contacyphon.			
Cyphon henrysi Pic, 1918	Beetle	Paul Prosper Henrys	The description of this species was published in France amid the celebrations for the Armistice of 11 November 1918, end of the hostilities of World War I, in which Henrys was a significant figure. Subsequently transferred to genus Contacyphon.			
Cyphon humberti Pic, 1918	Beetle	Georges Louis Humbert	The description of this species was published in France amid the celebrations for the Armistice of 11 November 1918, end of the hostilities of World War I, in which Humbert was a significant figure.			
Cyphon joffrei Pic, 1918	Beetle	Joseph Joffre	The description of this species was published in France amid the celebrations for the Armistice of 11 November 1918, end of the hostilities of World War I, in which Joffre was an important figure. Subsequently transferred to genus Contacyphon.			
Cyphon lemani Pic, 1918	Beetle	Gérard Leman	The description of this species was published in France amid the celebrations for the Armistice of 11 November 1918, end of the hostilities of World War I, in which Leman was a notable participant. Subsequently transferred to genus Contacyphon.			
Cyphon liggetti Pic, 1918	Beetle	Hunter Liggett	The description of this species was published in France amid the celebrations for the Armistice of 11 November 1918, end of the hostilities of World War I, in which Liggett was a significant figure. Subsequently transferred to genus Contacyphon.			
Cyphon lyauteyi Pic, 1918	Beetle	Hubert Lyautey	The description of this species was published in France amid the celebrations for the Armistice of 11 November 1918, end of the hostilities of World War I, in which Lyautey was a significant figure. Subsequently transferred to genus Contacyphon.			
Cyphon maistrei Pic, 1918	Beetle	Paul Maistre	The description of this species was published in France amid the celebrations for the Armistice of 11 November 1918, end of the hostilities of World War I, in which Maistre was a significant figure. Subsequently transferred to genus Contacyphon.			
Cyphon mangini Pic, 1918	Beetle	Charles Mangin	The description of this species was published in France amid the celebrations for the Armistice of 11 November 1918, end of the hostilities of World War I, in which Mangin was a significant figure. Subsequently transferred to genus Contacyphon.			
Cyphon paui Pic, 1918	Beetle	Paul Pau	The description of this species was published in France amid the celebrations for the Armistice of 11 November 1918, end of the hostilities of World War I, in which Pau was a significant figure. Subsequently transferred to genus Calvarium.			
Cyphon petri Pic, 1918	Beetle	Peter I of Serbia	The description of this species was published in France amid the celebrations for the Armistice of 11 November 1918, end of the hostilities of World War I, in which Peter I was a significant figure. "The name Petri will recall with emotion the Old King, wracked with pain and still walking to stand up to the invaders." Subsequently transferred to genus Contacyphon.			
Cyphon roosevelti Pic, 1918	Beetle	Theodore Roosevelt and Quentin Roosevelt	The description of this species was published in France amid the celebrations for the Armistice of 11 November 1918, end of the hostilities of World War I, in which Quentin Roosevelt had been killed in combat in France. "My dedication hidden under the name of Roosevelti will be doubly deserved, by a father, a great champion of law and justice, by a son who spontaneously made the sacrifice of his life for a sister nation". Subsequently transferred to genus Contacyphon.			
Cyphon savitchi Pic, 1918	Beetle	Milunka Savić	The description of this species was published in France amid the celebrations for the Armistice of 11 November 1918, end of the hostilities of World War I, in which Savić was a notable participant and Serbian war heroine. Subsequently transferred to genus Contacyphon.			
Cypraea noueli † Maury, 1917	Sea snail	Adolfo Alejandro Nouel	A fossil species from the Pliocene of the Dominican Republic. "I take the liberty of naming this species in honor of Archbishop Nouel of Santo Domingo, whom I had the honor of meeting in his beautiful and historic Cathedral."			
Cypraea patrespatriae † Maury, 1917	Sea snail	Juan Pablo Duarte, Matías Ramón Mella and Francisco del Rosario Sánchez	A fossil species from the Pliocene of the Dominican Republic. "The specific name proposed is in honor of the three liberator of the Dominican Republic." (patrespatriae means Founding Fathers in Latin)			
Davidius malloryi Fraser, 1926	Dragonfly	George Mallory	"I have named this interesting species after Mr. Mallory who so nobly laid down his life in the cause of science on the slopes of Mt. Everest." D. malloryi is native to Assam, India.			
Demonax fochi Pic, 1918	Beetle	Ferdinand Foch	The description of this species was published in France amid the celebrations for the Armistice of 11 November 1918, end of the hostilities of World War I, in which Foch was an important figure.			
Dendrobium victoriae-reginae Loher	Orchid	Queen Victoria				
Dendrophorbium chopinii Montesinos	Flowering plant	Frédéric Chopin	A species of arbuscular senecioneae from the Andes of North Peru. "The specific epithet honours Frédéric François Chopin (1810–1849), one of the greatest classical composers of all time, whose piano compositions are an inspiration to me and to many people around the world."			
Deratoptera alfredi Krefft, 1868	Manta ray	Alfred, Duke of Saxe-Coburg and Gotha	The reef manta ray was described from a specimen caught off the coast of Sydney, Australia, and named "with the permission, and in honor of, His Royal Highness the Duke of Edinborough, who accepted a number of photographs taken shortly after the fish was caught." Alfred was the first member of the British royal family to visit Australia, and suffered an attempt on his life during this trip. Subsequently transferred to genus Mobula.			
Diadegma meitnerae Kittel, 2016	Wasp	Lise Meitner	Replacement name for Diadegma simile (Pfankuch, 1914), which had originally been described as Angitia similis Pfankuch, 1914, but upon being transferred to the genus Diadegma in 1997, became a junior homonym of Diadegma simile (Brèthes, 1913).			
Diaporthe coracoralinae L.O. Ferro, Souza-Motta & J.D.P. Bezerra (2024)	Fungus	Cora Coralina	"Named in honour of Cora Coralina (Ana Lins dos Guimarães Peixoto, 1889-1985), a poet from Goiás state [where the specimens were collected], considered one of the most important writers of Brazilian literature."			
Dicliptera gracilirama Costa-Lima & E.C.O.Chagas	Flowering plant	Graciliano Ramos	"The specific epithet, in addition to alluding to the slender (gracilis in Latin) branches (ramus), is also in honor of the famous writer Graciliano Ramos (1892-1953), who was born in Quebrangulo, Alagoas, where the type was collected."			
Diplodocus carnegii † Hatcher, 1901	Dinosaur	Andrew Carnegie	"in honor of Mr. Andrew Carnegie, the founder of this institution [the Carnegie Museum of Natural History], and in recognition of his interest in vertebrate paleontology; which interest he has abundantly and substantially shown in providing the necessary funds for organizing and maintaining a Section of Vertebrate Paleontology in connection with this Museum."			
Diplopora grimaldii Jullien, 1903	Bryozoan	Albert I, Prince of Monaco	The prince was born Albert Grimaldi. This species was collected by one of the prince's research yachts, the Hirondelle. Subsequently transferred to genus Diplosolen.			
Dolecta akhmatovae Naydenov, Yakovlev, Penco & Sinyaev, 2020	Moth	Anna Akhmatova				
Dolecta bulgakovi Naydenov, Yakovlev, Penco & Sinyaev, 2020	Moth	Mikhail Bulgakov				
Dolecta chekhovi Naydenov, Yakovlev, Penco & Sinyaev, 2020	Moth	Anton Chekhov				
Dolecta dostoevskyi Naydenov, Yakovlev, Penco & Sinyaev, 2020	Moth	Fyodor Dostoevsky				
Dolecta esenini Naydenov, Yakovlev, Penco & Sinyaev, 2020	Moth	Sergei Yesenin	The surname Есенин is sometimes romanized as Esenin.			
Dolecta gertseni Naydenov, Yakovlev, Penco & Sinyaev, 2020	Moth	Alexander Herzen	The surname Ге́рцен is sometimes romanised as Gertsen.			
Dolecta gogoli Naydenov, Yakovlev, Penco & Sinyaev, 2020	Moth	Nikolai Gogol				
Dolecta lermontovi Naydenov, Yakovlev, Penco & Sinyaev, 2020	Moth	Mikhail Lermontov				
Dolecta nekrasovi Naydenov, Yakovlev, Penco & Sinyaev, 2020	Moth	Nikolay Nekrasov				
Dolecta ostrovskyi Naydenov, Yakovlev, Penco & Sinyaev, 2020	Moth	Alexander Ostrovsky				
Dolecta saltykovishchedrini Naydenov, Yakovlev, Penco & Sinyaev, 2020	Moth	Mikhail Saltykov-Shchedrin				
Dolecta stanyukovichi Naydenov, Yakovlev, Penco & Sinyaev, 2020	Moth	Konstantin Stanyukovich				
Dolecta tolstoyi Naydenov, Yakovlev, Penco & Sinyaev, 2020	Moth	Leo Tolstoy				
Dolecta turgenevi Naydenov, Yakovlev, Penco & Sinyaev, 2020	Moth	Ivan Turgenev				
Draco rizali Wandolleck, 1900	Lizard	José Rizal	This species of flying lizard was described from specimens collected by José Rizal during his exile in Dapitan, Mindanao. Subsequently synonymised with Draco guentheri.			
Draculoides bramstokeri Harvey & Humphreys, 1995	Schizomid	Bram Stoker				
Drassodella tolkieni Mbo & Haddad, 2019	Spider	J. R. R. Tolkien	A species from South Africa, "Named after John Ronald Reuel Tolkien, who was born in Bloemfontein, Free State, South Africa on 3rd January 1892 and died on 2nd September 1973. [...] His fictional "Middle Earth" is believed to have been inspired in part by the exceptional natural scenery of Hogsback, the type locality of this species."			
Dysanabatium johannesi † Bogri, Solodovnikov & Żyła, 20188	Beetle	Johannes V. Jensen	A fossil rove beetle found in Eocene Baltic amber.			
Dysanema malloryi Uvarov, 1925	Grasshopper	George Mallory	One of two species of Acridid grasshoppers collected by the 1924 British Mount Everest expedition and named after the two mountaineers who died on this expedition (see also List of organisms named after famous people (born 1900–1924)).			
Echeveria porfiriana J.Reyes, J.M.García & F.Díaz Salim	Flowering plant	Porfirio Díaz	This succulent shrub is native to Oaxaca, Mexico.			
Effigia okeeffeae † Nesbitt & Norell, 2006	Archosaur	Georgia O'Keeffe	From the Triassic period. Closest living relatives are the crocodilians			
Ellipsodon witkoi † Van Valen, 1978	Condylarth (an extinct order of mammals)	Crazy Horse	A fossil mammal from the Paleocene of New Mexico, named after Crazy Horse's Lakota name, Tasunke Witko. Subsequently synonymised with Ellipsodon grangeri Wilson 1956.			
Ellipsodon yotankae † Van Valen, 1978	Condylarth (an extinct order of mammals)	Sitting Bull	A fossil mammal from the Paleocene of New Mexico, named after Sitting Bull's Lakota name, Tatanka Yotanka.			
Elodes clemenceaui Pic, 1918	Beetle	Georges Clemenceau	The description of this species was published in France amid the celebrations for the Armistice of 11 November 1918, end of the hostilities of World War I, in which Clemenceau was an important figure. Subsequently transferred to genus Brachycyphon.			
Elodes estiennei Pic, 1918	Beetle	Jean Baptiste Eugène Estienne	The description of this species was published in France amid the celebrations for the Armistice of 11 November 1918, end of the hostilities of World War I, in which Estienne was an important figure. "The powerful force of the tanks will be entomologically glorified under the name of Estiennei".			
Elodes fayollei Pic, 1918	Beetle	Émile Fayolle	The description of this species was published in France amid the celebrations for the Armistice of 11 November 1918, end of the hostilities of World War I, in which Fayolle was an important figure.			
Elodes lloydi Pic, 1918	Beetle	David Lloyd George	The description of this species was published in France amid the celebrations for the Armistice of 11 November 1918, end of the hostilities of World War I, in which Lloyd George was an important figure. Subsequently transferred to genus Brachycyphon.			
Elodes petaini Pic, 1918	Beetle	Philippe Pétain	The description of this species was published in France amid the celebrations for the Armistice of 11 November 1918, end of the hostilities of World War I, in which Pétain was an important figure. Subsequently transferred to genus Brachycyphon.			
Elodes pichoni Pic, 1918	Beetle	Stephen Pichon	The description of this species was published in France amid the celebrations for the Armistice of 11 November 1918, end of the hostilities of World War I, in which Pichon was an important figure. "I wished to distinguish, among all, a skilful diplomat, with a clear vision from the beginning of the gigantic struggle, but who came a little late to the direction of foreign affairs"			
Elodes raynali Pic, 1918	Beetle	Sylvain Eugène Raynal	The description of this species was published in France amid the celebrations for the Armistice of 11 November 1918, end of the hostilities of World War I, in which Raynal was an important figure.			
Elodes wilsoni Pic, 1918	Beetle	Woodrow Wilson	The description of this species was published in France amid the celebrations for the Armistice of 11 November 1918, end of the hostilities of World War I, in which Wilson was an important figure.			
Emersonella Girault, 1916	Wasp	Ralph Waldo Emerson				
Emersonia Girault, 1933	Wasp	Ralph Waldo Emerson	Subsequently synonimised with genus Dipara.			
Emersonopsis Girault, 1917	Wasp	Ralph Waldo Emerson	Subsequently synonimised with genus Paracrias.			
Emplectonema osceolai Corrêa, 1961	Ribbon worm	Osceola	A species native to Florida, US, named "in reference to the Indian chief Osceola, famous in Florida history."			
Encyrtus newcombi Girault, 1915	Wasp	Simon Newcomb	Subsequently transferred to genus Microterys.			
Encyrtus wundti Girault, 1915	Wasp	Wilhelm Wundt	Immediately after its formal description, within the same paper, this species was transferred to genus Paraphaenodiscus.			
Entedonomorpha renani Girault, 1913	Wasp	Ernest Renan	Subsequently, genus Entedonomorpha was synonymised with Deutereulophus.			
Entedonomphale esenini Triapitsyn, 2005	Wasp	Sergei Yesenin	The surname Есенин is sometimes romanized as Esenin.			
Entedonomphale lermontovi Triapitsyn, 2005	Wasp	Mikhail Lermontov				
Entedonomphale stalini Girault, 1934	Wasp	Joseph Stalin	Subsequently synonymised with Entedonomphale margiscutum.			
Epimegastigmus darlingi Girault, 1940	Wasp	Grace Darling	Subsequently transferred to genus Megastigmus.			
Epiquadrastichus emersoni Girault, 1915	Wasp	Ralph Waldo Emerson	Subsequently transferred to genus Neotrichoporoides.			
Epitetrastichus ibseni Girault, 1916	Wasp	Henrik Ibsen	Subsequently transferred to genus Tetrastichus.			
Epitetrastichus longfellowi Girault, 1913	Wasp	Henry Wadsworth Longfellow	Subsequently synonymised with Aprostocetus hagenowii (Ratzeburg, 1852)			
Equus grevyi Oustalet, 1882	Zebra	Jules Grévy	The species was described from a specimen gifted in 1882 by Menelik II, King of Shewa, to French President Jules Grévy, which Grévy then donated to the French National Museum of Natural History; the name "Grévy's zebra" was proposed by the Museum's director, Alphonse Milne-Edwards.			
Erigone malvari Barrion & Litsinger, 1995	Spider	Miguel Malvar	This species is endemic to the Philippines.			
Ernstmayria venizelosi Ćurčić, Dimitrijević & Trichas, 2007	Pseudoscorpion	Eleftherios Venizelos	"After the name of Eleftherios Venizelos, a noted Cretan humanist and politician." This species is endemic to the island of Crete, Greece.			
Erythroneura geronimoi Knull, 1945	Leafhopper	Geronimo	This species was described from specimens collected in the Chiricahua Mountains, and "Named for Geronimo, chief of the Chiricahua band of Apaches."			
Etheostoma faulkneri Sterling & Warren 2020	Fish	William Faulkner	"We have named the species Etheostoma faulkneri to honor the great writer and Nobel Laureate William C. Faulkner (1897–1962), a native of the Oxford, Mississippi, area who was also an avid hunter and fisher. The landscape was an important theme in many of his works, and the actions of his characters were often influenced by the lands and streams surrounding his fictional Jefferson, Mississippi, including the Yocona River, which he renamed the Yoknapatawpha." This species is endemic to headwater streams of the Yocona River watershed. The authors gave it the common name "Yoknapatawpha darter", using Faulkner's version of the Yocona River's name.			
Etheostoma teddyroosevelt Layman & Mayden, 2012	Fish	Theodore Roosevelt	The scientific name of the highland darter, endemic to the Arkansas and White River drainages, honors Roosevelt for "his enduring legacy in environmental conservation and stewardship, including the designation of vast areas as national forests, wildlife refuges, national monuments, and national parks, and his efforts to forge the American Museum of Natural History, New York."			
Euconnus kilmeri Caterino, 2022	Beetle	Joyce Kilmer	A rove beetle known only from a single locality in Joyce Kilmer Memorial Forest, North Carolina, and "named to honor the American poet Joyce Kilmer "I think that I shall never see, a poem as lovely as a tree..." for whom the type locality stands as a proper monument to his appreciation for nature."			
Eucteniza panchovillai Bond & Godwin, 2013	Spider	Pancho Villa	Discovered in San Juan del Rio, Durango, birthplace of Villa			
Eucypris lobatoi † Bergue, Ramos & Maranhão, 2018	Crustacean	Monteiro Lobato	A fossil ostracod from the Oligocene of Taubaté basin, Brazil, named "In honor of the writer José Bento Monteiro Lobato, born in the Taubaté Municipality, and a rouser of the Brazilian oil industry."			
Eudiospilus rubrumbarus Zhang & Sharanowski, 2014	Wasp	Manfred von Richthofen (The Red Baron)	"In honor of Baron Manfred von Richthofen, the "Red Baron", as the coloration on the head of this species resembles that of a leather aviator helmet".			
Eudorcas thomsonii Günther, 1884	Gazelle	Joseph Thomson				
Eupelmus dumasi Girault, 1915	Wasp	Alexandre Dumas				
Eupelmus greelyi Girault, 1915	Wasp	Adolphus Greely				
Eupelmus renani Girault, 1915	Wasp	Ernest Renan				
Eupithecia nabokovi McDunnough, 1945	Moth	Vladimir Nabokov	A North American geometer moth described from specimens collected by Nabokov.			
Euplectrotetrastichus spenceri Girault, 1915	Wasp	Herbert Spencer	Genus Euplectrotetrastichus subsequently synonymised with Sigmophora.			
Euplocania teslai Vinasco-Mondragón, González-Obando & García Aldrete, 2022	Barklouse	Nikola Tesla				
Eurydice grimaldii Dollfus, 1888	Crustacean	Albert I, Prince of Monaco	The prince was born Albert Grimaldi. This isopod was described from specimens collected by one of the prince's research yachts, the Hirondelle.			
Eurygarka freyrei Ježek, Le Pont, Martínez & Mollinedo, 2011	Fly	Ricardo Jaimes Freyre	A moth fly from Bolivia.			
Euryischia sumneri Girault, 1913	Wasp	Charles Sumner	"Dedicated with much respect to Charles Sumner for his orations on war."			
Euryischomyia washingtoni Girault, 1914	Wasp	Booker T. Washington				
Eurytoma lincolni Girault, 1913	Wasp	Abraham Lincoln				
Eurytoma mazzinii Girault, 1913	Wasp	Giuseppe Mazzini	"Dedicated to Giuseppe Mazzini for his The Duties of Man."			
Eurytoma poincarei Girault, 1913	Wasp	Henri Poincaré				
Eusarcus garibaldiae Hara & Pinto-da-Rocha, 2010	Harvestman	Anita Garibaldi	A species native to Brazil; "The name honors an important revolutionary, Anita Garibaldi, who was born in the same state where this species was collected." (Santa Catarina)			
Evagetes bengurioni Wolf, 1988	Wasp	David Ben-Gurion	"David Ben Gurion (1886-1973) rendered great services in matters of international understanding." The holotype for the species was found in Israel, state of which Ben-Gurion was primary national founder and first Prime Minister.			
Farciminaria alice Jullien, 1903	Bryozoan	Alice, Princess of Monaco	Species described from specimens collected by one of Prince Albert I of Monaco's (Alice's husband) research yachts, the Hirondelle. Subsequently transferred to the genus Farciminellum.			
Farlowella roncallii Martín Salazar, 1964	Fish	Pope John XXIII	"in honour of His Holiness John XXIII [born Angelo Giuseppe Roncalli], who has rightly been called the Pope of Peace."; Subsequently synonymised with Farlowella vittata.			
Felis margarita Loche, 1858	Cat	Jean Auguste Margueritte				
Fernandocrambus chopinellus Błeszyński, 1967	Moth	Frédéric Chopin				
Foenatopus prousti Aguiar & Turrisi, 2010	Wasp	Marcel Proust				
Froudeana Girault, 1928	Wasp	James Anthony Froude	Subsequently synonymised with Omphalodipara.			
Fukomys livingstoni Faulkes, Mgode, Archer & Bennett, 2017	Rodent	David Livingstone	"This species is named after Dr. David Livingstone, as Ujiji (the type locality) is the site of the famous meeting on 10 November 1871 when Henry Morton Stanley found the explorer David Livingstone, who many thought to be dead, and uttered the famous words "Dr. Livingstone, I presume?"			
Gabrius tolkieni Schillhammer, 1997	Beetle	J. R. R. Tolkien				
Gastrancistrus robertsoni Girault, 1915	Wasp	Frederick William Robertson				
Gaudipluma † Artal, Van Bakel, Fraaije & Jagt, 2013	Crustacean	Antoni Gaudí	A genus of fossil crabs from the Eocene of Huesca, Spain, named "in honour of the Catalan architect Antoni Gaudí (1852–1926), in allusion to the shape and ornament of the new taxon which is defined by sinuous lines, reminiscent of his works"			
Gelis nightingalae Kittel, 2016	Wasp	Florence Nightingale	Replacement name for Gelis stigmaticus (Hedwig, 1961), which had originally been described as Pezomachus stigmaticus Hedwig, 1961, but upon being transferred to the genus Gelis in 1997, became a junior homonym of Gelis stigmaticus (Zetterstedt, 1838).			
Gelis noetherae Kittel, 2016	Wasp	Emmy Noether	Replacement name for Gelis longipes (Rudow, 1917), which had originally been described as Pezomachus longipes Rudow, 1917, but upon being transferred to the genus Gelis in 1944, became a junior homonym of Gelis longipes (Strickland, 1912).			
Geophis juarezi Nieto-Montes de Oca, 2003	Snake	Benito Juárez	A species of earth snake described from specimens collected in Santiago Comaltepec, Sierra Juárez, Oaxaca, Mexico, and named "for Don Benito Juárez (1806–1872), the Zapotec Indian President of Mexico born in San Pablo Guelatao in the Sierra de Juárez, Oaxaca."			
Gephyrocrinus grimaldii Koehler & Bather, 1902	Sea lily	Albert I, Prince of Monaco	The prince was born Albert Grimaldi. This species was described from specimens collected by one of the prince's research yachts, the Princesse Alice.			
Gibberula rachmaninovi Kellner, 2003	Sea snail	Sergei Rachmaninoff	"named after the great Russian composer and pianist Sergei Rachmaninov [sic]". This species was subsequently synonymised with Volvarina sauliae (Sowerby II, 1846).			
Gladiopycnodus karami † Taverne & Capasso, 2013	Fish	Youssef Bey Karam	A fossil pycnodontiform from the Cretaceous of Lebanon, "dedicated to Youssef Bey Karam (1823-1889), the famous hero of Lebanon who lived during the time this country was ruled by the Ottoman Empire."			
Goetheana kobzari Gumovski, 2016	Wasp	Taras Shevchenko	"The specific epithet derives from "kobzar", an itinerant Ukrainian bard and also the nickname of the famous Ukrainian poet Taras Shevchenko (1814–1861). This is a continuation of the trend of A.A. Girault's and S.V. Triapitsyn naming species of this genus after the great poets and writers of the past." (see List of organisms named after famous people (born before 1800))			
Gogoltilla Williams, Brothers & Pitts, 2011	Velvet ant	Nikolai Gogol				
Gonatocerus helmholtzii Girault, 1912	Wasp	Hermann von Helmholtz	"Dedicated to Hermann Helmholtz, a man who aided in establishing the great principle of the conservation of energy in all substance." Subsequently transferred to the genus Lymaenon.			
Gonatocerus mazzinini Girault, 1913	Wasp	Giuseppe Mazzini	"Respectfully dedicated to Giuseppe Mazzini for his essays, more especially for his The Duties of Man."; Subsequently transferred to the genus Lymaenon.			
Gonatocerus poincarei Girault, 1913	Wasp	Henri Poincaré	Subsequently transferred to the genus Lymaenon.			
Gonatocerus tolstoii Girault, 1913	Wasp	Leo Tolstoy	"Dedicated to Leo N. Tolstoi for his work War and Peace."; Subsequently transferred to the genus Lymaenon.			
Goncharovtilla Williams, Bartholomay & Lopez, 2024	Velvet ant	Ivan Goncharov	"This name references the initial discovery of the genus in the Brazilian city of Russas (Portuguese for Russians [fem.]), Ceará, and tribal affiliation with Gogoltilla Williams, Brothers & Pitts, 2011 from Argentina (named after the Ukrainian-Russian author Nikolai Gogol)"			
Goniopholis kiplingi † de Andrade et al., 2011	Crocodile	Rudyard Kipling	A fossil crocodyliform from the Cretaceous of Southern England. "Specific name after Rudyard Kipling, British novelist, author of The Jungle Book amongst others and an important disseminator of natural sciences through literature, from the end of the 19th century to the beginning of the 20th century."			
Gounodia Girault, 1940	Wasp	Charles Gounod	Subsequently synonymised with Epistenoterys.			
Grammeubria emmanueli Pic, 1918	Beetle	Victor Emmanuel III of Italy	The description of this species was published in France amid the celebrations for the Armistice of 11 November 1918, end of the hostilities of World War I, in which Victor Emmanuel III was an important figure. "The name Emmanueli will recall a patriotic and inspired monarch who, by refusing to serve the insatiable German appetites, contributed to the triumph of Latin ideas." Subsequently transferred to genus Dicranopselaphus.			
Grantanna Girault, 1939	Wasp	Ulysses S. Grant	This genus was subsequently synonymised with Ufens Girault, 1911			
Graphium (Pazala) mandarinus stilwelli Cotton & Hu, 2018	Fish	Joseph Stilwell	This subspecies in native to western Yunnan and Myanmar and is "dedicated to General Joseph W. Stilwell (1883–1946) of the U.S. Army, who served in the China Burma India (CBI) Theatre and was instrumental in the liberation of W. Yunnan and Myanmar during World War II."			
Grimaldichthys Roule, 1913	Fish	Albert I, Prince of Monaco	The prince was born Albert Grimaldi. This genus of cusk eels was described from a specimen collected by Princess Alice using a trap designed by Prince Albert, in Cape Verde, at a depth of 6,035 m (19,800 ft). Other specimens were later captured at depths of up to 7,160 m (23,490 ft), and for decades it was thought that the species Grimaldichthys profundissimus was the fish living at the greatest depth in the world, until another cusk eel, Abyssobrotula galatheae—one specimen of which was found at a depth of over 8,000 m (26,000 ft)—was described in 1977. Grimaldichthys has been subsequently synonymised with Holcomycteronus.			
Grimalditeuthis Joubin, 1898	Squid	Albert I, Prince of Monaco	The prince was born Albert Grimaldi. This genus was described from specimens collected by one of the prince's research yachts, the Princesse Alice.			
Grotiusella pearsoni Girault, 1915	Wasp	Karl Pearson	Genus Grotiusella was subsequently synonymised with Eulophinusia.			
Grotiusella thoreauini Girault, 1915	Wasp	Henry David Thoreau	Genus Grotiusella was subsequently synonymised with Eulophinusia.			
Guildayichthys carnegiei † Lund, 2000	Fish	Andrew Carnegie	A fossil species found in the Carboniferous Bear Gulch Limestone of Montana, US; "Named in honor of Andrew Carnegie, founder of Carnegie Museum of Natural History, Pittsburgh, Pennsylvania." (where the holotype and most known specimens are kept)			
Gulbenkiania Vaz-Moreira, Nobre, Nunes & Manaia, 2007	Bacterium	Calouste Gulbenkian	"in honour of Calouste Gulbenkian (1869–1955), a protector of the arts and sciences in Portugal, and founder of the Fundação Calouste Gulbenkian." (which partially financed the research)			
Gynacantha chaplini Khan, 2021	Dragonfly	Charlie Chaplin	"The species is named in honour of the famous British actor and director, Sir Charles Spencer "Charlie" Chaplin [...]. The trapezium-shaped marking of the postfrons of the new species resembles Chaplin's iconic toothbrush moustache."			
Gynacantha lyttoni Fraser, 1926	Dragonfly	Victor Bulwer-Lytton, 2nd Earl of Lytton	Subsequently synonymised with Gynacantha bayadera Selys, 1891.			
Gyrolasomyia washingtoni Girault, 1913	Wasp	Booker T. Washington				
Habronattus geronimoi Griswold, 1987	Spider	Geronimo	The holotype of this jumping spider was collected in the Chiricahua Mountains; the species is "named in honor of Geronimo, leader of the Chiricahua Apaches."			
Hapalopus vangoghi Osorio et al., 2024	Spider	Vincent van Gogh				
Heleioporus eyrei Gray, 1845	Frog	Edward John Eyre				
Helioandesia tarregai Vargas, 2021	Moth	Francisco Tárrega	"named in memory of the eminent Spanish guitarist and composer Francisco Tárrega, for his huge contribution to the repertory of the classical guitar, especially for the wonderful 'Marieta'."			
Heliosorex roosevelti Heller, 1910	Shrew	Theodore Roosevelt	Described from specimens collected by the Smithsonian–Roosevelt African Expedition. "I take much pleasure in naming this distinct type of shrew for Colonel Roosevelt, who took a keen personal interest in the collection of small mammals." Subsequently transferred to the genus Crocidura.			
Hellinsia alfaroi Gielis, 2011	Moth	Eloy Alfaro	This species is native to Ecuador and "named after Elroy [sic] Alfaro, president of Ecuador, who was assassinated in 1912."			
Hellinsia morenoi Gielis, 2011	Moth	Gabriel García Moreno	This species is native to Ecuador and "named after president Garcia Moreno of Ecuador, who was assassinated in 1875."			
Hemiargus bornoi Comstock & Huntington, 1943	Butterfly	Louis Borno	This species was described from specimens collected in Haiti. Subsequently transferred to genus Pseudochrysops.			
Hemichromis livingstonii Günther, 1894	Fish	David Livingstone	This fish is native to Lake Malawi, which Livingstone claimed to have discovered; during the Second Zambesi expedition, led by him, the first fishes from this lake were collected for scientific studies. Subsequently transferred to genus Nimbochromis.			
Hemingwaya † Sytchevskaya & Prokofiev, 2002	Fish	Ernest Hemingway	A fossil billfish from the Eocene of Turkmenistan. No etymology explanation was given, but it's probably a reference to the marlin in Hemingway's novella The Old Man and the Sea.			
Hernandaria anitagaribaldiae DaSilva & Pinto-da-Rocha, 2010	Harvestman	Anita Garibaldi	"In honor of Anita Garibaldi (1821-1849), republican revolutionary from Santa Catarina state who fought for freedom against the monarchal central government of Brazil and in Europe."; This species is native to Santa Catarina state, Brazil.			
Herpele fulleri Alcock, 1904	Caecilian	Bampfylde Fuller	Subsequently transferred to newly created genus Chikila.			
Heterocarpus grimaldii A. Milne-Edwards & Bouvier, 1900	Crustacean	Albert I, Prince of Monaco	The prince was born Albert Grimaldi. This species of deep-sea shrimp was described from specimens collected by two of the prince's research yachts, the Hirondelle and the Princesse Alice.			
Heterochaeta grimaldii Richard, 1893	Crustacean	Albert I, Prince of Monaco	The prince was born Albert Grimaldi. This species of copepod was described from specimens collected by one of the prince's research yachts, the Hirondelle. Subsequently transferred to genus Hemirhabdus.			
Hexactinella grimaldii Topsent, 1890	Sponge	Albert I, Prince of Monaco	The prince was born Albert Grimaldi. This species was described from specimens collected by one of the prince's research yachts, the Hirondelle.			
Hindsia grimaldii Dautzenberg, 1889	Sea snail	Albert I, Prince of Monaco	The prince was born Albert Grimaldi. This species of was described from specimens collected by one of the prince's research yachts, the Hirondelle. Subsequently transferred to genus Pisanianura.			
Hogna bonifacioi Barrion & Litsinger, 1995	Spider	Andrés Bonifacio	This species is endemic to the Philippines.			
Hogna rizali Barrion & Litsinger, 1995	Spider	José Rizal	This species is endemic to the Philippines.			
Hortipes horta Bosselaers & Jocqué, 2000	Spider	Victor Horta	"in honor of the famous Jugendstil architect and designer Victor Horta (1861–1947). The elegant curves and angles of the ID [insemination duct] of the present species remind [us of] some of the Horta designs"			
Hortipes klumpkeae Bosselaers & Jocqué, 2000	Spider	Dorothea Klumpke	"in honor of Dorothea Klumpke (1861–1942), astronomer known for her work on Saturn's rings and for her contributions to the Carte du Ciel program."			
Houdinia Hoare, Dugdale & Watts, 2006	Moth	Harry Houdini	"The genus is named after the renowned escapologist Harry Houdini (1874–1926). The name alludes not only to the remarkable metamorphosis of the attenuate larva and the adult's escape from the tight confines of the Sporadanthus stem, but also to the manner in which the species itself escaped detection by entomologists for so long."			
Hyale grimaldii Chevreux, 1891	Crustacean	Albert I, Prince of Monaco	The prince was born Albert Grimaldi. This species of amphipod was described from specimens collected by one of the prince's research yachts, the Hirondelle. Subsequently transferred to genus Protohyale.			
Hydraena einsteini Perkins, 2011	Beetle	Albert Einstein				
Hylomyrma adelae Ulysséa, 2021	Ant	Adela Zamudio	"named in honor of Adela Zamudio (1854–1928), a Bolivian educator, feminist, and poetess [...] born in Cochabamba, from where this species is known."			
Hylomyrma jeronimae Ulysséa, 2021	Ant	Jerônima Mesquita	"named after Jerônima Mesquita (1880–1972), a Brazilian feminist, pioneer of the women's suffrage in Brazil. She also advocated for the equality of rights and opportunity of women, and co-founder, along with Berta Lutz (1894–1976) and Stella Guerra Duval (1879–1971), of the League for the Intellectual Emancipation of Women in 1918 (which subsequently became the Brazilian Federation for Women's Progress)."			
Hyloscirtus tolkieni Sánchez-Nivicela, Falcón-Reibán & Cisneros-Heredia, 2023	Frog	J. R. R. Tolkien	"in honour of the writer, poet, philologist, and academic John Ronald Reuel Tolkien (J.R.R. Tolkien, 1892–1973), creator of Middle-earth and author of fantasy works like The Hobbit and The Lord of the Rings. The amazing colours of the new species evoke the magnificent creatures that seem to only exist in fantasy worlds."			
Hymenobacter amundsenii Sedláček et al., 2019	Bacterium	Roald Amundsen	The type strain was isolated from rock samples collected in Antarctica.			
Hypopta mussolinii Turati, 1927	Moth	Benito Mussolini	A species described from specimens collected in Italian Cyrenaica (present-day Libya); "And this is a magnificent novelty well worthy of bearing the name of the 'Genius of Italy', to whom I dedicate it with reverent admiration." Subsequently synonymised with Mormogystia reibellii.			
Hypsiboas alfaroi Caminer & Ron, 2014	Frog	Eloy Alfaro	A tree frog native to Ecuador, named "for Eloy Alfaro Delgado, former Ecuadorian president (1897–1901 and 1906–1911) and leader of the liberal revolution in Ecuador. His government promoted the separation between church and state and the modernization of Ecuador by supporting education and large-scale systems of transportation and communication." Subsequently transferred to genus Boana.			
Hystrichodexia pueyrredoni Brèthes, 1918	Fly	Honorio Pueyrredón	A parasitic fly from Argentina; the holotype was collected by Pueyrredón, who was Minister of Agriculture at the time.			
Ichneumon potterae Kittel, 2016	Wasp	Beatrix Potter	Replacement name for Ichneumon vittatus Gmelin, 1790, which was preoccupied by Ichneumon vittatus Geoffroy, 1785.			
Ictinus regis-alberti Schouteden, 1934	Dragonfly	Albert I of Belgium	A species described from specimens collected in the Belgian Congo (present-day Democratic Republic of the Congo). "I dedicate this new Ictinus, so remarkable, to the memory of H.M. King Albert, a sincere friend of the Congo Museum, whom death has just brutally taken from us." Genus Ictinus was later renamed to Ictinogomphus to avoid homonymy with a different genus of beetles, and the hyphen of the specific name was eliminated, making the current accepted name Ictinogomphus regisalberti.			
Idiomacromerus longfellowi Girault, 1917	Wasp	Henry Wadsworth Longfellow	Subsequently synonymised with Idiomacromerus terebrator.			
Ilyoplax sayajiraoi JN Trivedi, Soni, DJ Trivedi & Vachhrajani, 2015	Crustacean	Sayajirao Gaekwad III	A species of crab from Gujarat, India, described by scientists of the Maharaja Sayajirao University of Baroda and "named in honor of the founder of Baroda Collage [sic] Sir Sayajirao Gaikwad III, Maharaja of the erstwhile state of Baroda, Gujarat." One of the researchers added it was "a tribute to Maharaja Sayajirao Gaekwad – the visionary ruler who had initiated and entrusted the research on marine animals of Okhamandal in 1900. He had also played an important role in the development of education system in the erstwhile Baroda state."			
Inacayalestes † Petrulevičius, 2015	Damselfly	Inacayal	A fossil species from the Eocene of Neuquén Province, Argentina, named "in honour of Inacayal (1833-1888), Günün a Küne (Puelche) chief (Cacique) of the region of Nahuel Huapi Lake; and "lestes", because [it is a] usual ending for lestoid damselflies. Inacayal was captured by the Argentinean state army (conducted by General Julio Argentino Roca) during the genocidal campaign "Conquest of the Desert" carried out to break the sovereignty of the indigenous communities in Patagonia. After that, he was "rescued" from the detention camp with part of his family by the Perito Francisco Josué Pascasio Moreno in gratitude for his help in a previous Patagonian expedition. He was installed, as a living and afterwards as a dead specimen, in the Museo de La Plata from 1886 to 1888 where he died [for] no clear reasons. His skeleton was restituted to Patagonia by a National Law, after claims by several indigenous communities and a National Senator, in 1994. Nevertheless, other claimed remains as his scalp and brain and also from other members of the community are still part of the collection of the museum."			
Indiocyphon allenbyi Pic, 1918	Beetle	Edmund Allenby	The description of this species was published in France amid the celebrations for the Armistice of 11 November 1918, end of the hostilities of World War I, in which Allenby was an important figure. The genus Indiocyphon was subsequently synonymised with Calvarium.			
Indomarengo chavarapater Malamel, Prajapati, Sudhikumar & Sebastian, 2019	Spider	Kuriakose Elias Chavara	A jumping spider native to India, "dedicated to Saint Chavara who was a great educator and founder of the Carmelites of Mary Immaculate (CMI) congregation, the first Catholic congregation in India. The affiliated institution of all the authors is run by the CMI congregation."			
Intelcystiscus teresacarrenoae Ortea & Espinosa, 2016	Sea snail	Teresa Carreño	"Named in honour of Teresa Carreño (1853-1917), the illustrious Venezuelan pianist and composer, [...] to whom the first edition of the Musiciennes en Guadeloupe festival paid tribute." The species was found in Guadeloupe, during an expedition that took place at the same time as the aforementioned music festival in the islands.			
Iotreron eugeniae Gould, 1856	Bird	Eugénie de Montijo	The White-headed fruit dove, endemic to the Solomon Islands. Genus Iotreron was subsequently synonymised with Ptilinopus.			
Ischaemum sayajiraoi Raole & R.J.Desai	Flowering plant	Sayajirao Gaekwad III	A species of grass from Gujarat, India, described by scientists of the Maharaja Sayajirao University of Baroda and named "in honour of the 'Maharaja' of Vadodara state and founder of Baroda College."			
Ischasia carlosgardeli Da Silva Carli, Monné, Santos-Silva & Rafael, 2026	Beetle	Carlos Gardel	The authors dedicated this species to the favourite singer of their late colleague M.A. Monné, after whom they had named several other species already.			
Ischnopelta coralinae Rosso & Campos, 2021	True bug	Cora Coralina	A shield bug named "in honor to the poet Cora Coralina, codename for Anna Lins dos Guimarães Peixoto Bretas, born in Goiás (Goiás, Brazil). Her poetic work is rich in the daily life of the Brazilian interior, and her first book was published when she was almost 76 years old. She died at 95 years old. The specimens used for the description of the species are mostly from the poet's birth city and nearby locations."			
Ixchela juarezi Valdez-Mondragón, 2013	Spider	Benito Juárez	A cellar spider from Mexico "dedicated to Benito Juárez García (1806–1872) in recognition of his role in the Mexican History; he was a Mexican lawyer and politician of Zapotec Indian origin and President of Mexico on several occasions, between 18 December 1857 and 18 July 1872. Born in Guelatao, municipality of the type locality of the species."			
Ixchela panchovillai Valdez-Mondragón, 2020	Spider	Pancho Villa	A cellar spider from Mexico "dedicated to Doroteo Arango Arámbula, better known as "Francisco Villa", "Pancho Villa", or "Centauro del Norte"; a famous Mexican revolutionary who fought during the Mexican Revolution (1910-1917) in the North of Mexico."			
Ixchela zapatai Valdez-Mondragón, 2020	Spider	Emiliano Zapata	A cellar spider from Mexico "dedicated to Emiliano Zapata Salazar, better known as "Emiliano Zapata, el Caudillo del Sur", a famous Mexican revolutionary who fought during the Mexican Revolution (1910-1917) in the Central-South region of Mexico."			
Janssoniella kawabatai Tselikh, 2020	Wasp	Yasunari Kawabata	This species is native to Japan and South Korea.			
Kahlerosphaera hamvasi † Kozur, Moix & Ozsvárt, 2007	Protist	Béla Hamvas	A fossil radiolarian from the Triassic of Turkey.			
Kalayaan bonifacioi Corpuz-Raros 1998	Mite	Andrés Bonifacio	This species, endemic to the Philippines, "is named in honor of the late Supremo Andres Bonifacio, who founded the revolutionary movement, Kataas-Taasan Kagalanggalangang Katipunan ng mga Anak ng Bayan or KKK, a major force behind the Philippine revolution against Spain."; The name of the genus Kalayaan means "freedom" in Filipino language, and was created concurrently to commemorate the 100th anniversary of the Philippine Declaration of Independence (12 June 1898).			
Kalayaan rizali Corpuz-Raros 1998	Mite	José Rizal	This species, endemic to the Philippines, "is named in honor of the Philippines' National Hero, Dr Jose Protacio Rizal, whose nationalist writings and exposés on the abuses of Spanish authorities enlightened the Filipino people and emboldened armed revolutionaries to take more decisive actions in their struggle for independence from Spain."; The name of the genus Kalayaan means "freedom" in Filipino language, and was created concurrently to commemorate the 100th anniversary of the Philippine Declaration of Independence (12 June 1898).			
Kalanchoe × poincarei Raym.-Hamet & H.Perrier	Flowering plant	Raymond Poincaré	"This curious crassulacea, having been recognized as new on February 17, 1913, the day of the election of Mr. Raymond Poincaré to the presidency of the Republic, we are pleased to give the name of the eminent statesman to this new species from one of our richest colonies [Madagascar]."			
Kalanchoe salazari Raym.-Hamet	Flowering plant	António de Oliveira Salazar	A species of succulent plant native to Angola, described from a specimen housed at the herbarium of the University of Coimbra; "a new and well-characterised species that we are pleased to dedicate to the eminent professor of the University of Coimbra, President Antonio de Oliveira Salazar, whose political genius made a new sun rise on the destiny of Portugal."			
Kerygmachela kierkegaardi † Budd, 1993	Early Arthropod	Søren Kierkegaard	An early arthropod from the Cambrian period. The fossils were found in Greenland and are housed at the University of Copenhagen Geological Museum.			
Khamul tolkeini Gates, 2008	Wasp	J. R. R. Tolkien	"named in honor of J. R. R. Tolkein [sic] for his profound impact on the fantasy literature genre." The generic name Khamul is "named for the only Nazgl [sic] specifically named by J. R. R. Tolkein [sic], Khaml [sic], the Shadow of the East (aka Black Easterling)"			
Kora corallina Simone, 2012	Snail	Cora Coralina	A species native to Brazil. "The specific epithet refers to the outline of the shell, resembling a coral polyp, from the Latin corallium. The name is also a regard to Cora Coralina, the pseudonym of Ana Lins dos Guimarães Peixoto Bretas (1889-1985), a famous Brazilian poet novelist."			
Kruschevia † Flower, 1961	Worm	Nikita Khrushchev	A fossil from the Ordovician of New Mexico, USA. Named by Rousseau H. Flower to show his dislike of the Soviet Premier. "One body, which resembles a fossil wart, I have named for a certain international figure whose activities in Washington made me seriously late in arriving at the U.S. National Museum." (This refers to the State visit by Nikita Khrushchev to the United States in 1959).			
Kuskaella bajerae † Fanti & Damgaard, 2018	Beetle	Matilde Bajer	A fossil soldier beetle found in Eocene Baltic amber from Kaliningrad Oblast.			
Lactobacillus curieae Lei, Sun, Xie & Wei, 2013	Bacterium	Marie Curie	A lactic acid bacterium isolated from stinky tofu brine in China. "named after Marie Curie, a role model for female scientists." Subsequently transferred to genus Lentilactobacillus.			
Ladeaschistus borgesi Cioato, Bianchi, Eger & Grazia, 2015	True bug	Jorge Luis Borges	"Named in honor of Jorge Luis Borges, one of the most important writers from South-America. This late Argentinean writer is a milestone of literary fiction with his metaphysical tales, essays, and poetry."			
Lamprolia victoriae Finsch, 1874	Bird	Victoria, Princess Royal	"I have great pleasure in naming this most remarkable and brilliant new species Lamprolia victoriae, in honour of Her Imperial and Royal Highness Victoria, Crown-Princess of the German Empire and of Prussia."; Known as the Taveuni silktail, this bird is endemic to the island of Taveuni in Fiji.			
Lathrolestes fiedleri Reshchikov, 2015	Wasp	Arkady Fiedler				
Leda whitmani † Dall, 1909	Bivalve	Marcus Whitman	A fossil clam from the Pleistocene of Oregon, US. Genus Leda was subsequently synonymised with Nuculana.			
Leiochrodes georgi Pic, 1918	Beetle	George V	The description of this species was published in France amid the celebrations for the Armistice of 11 November 1918, end of the hostilities of World War I, in which George V was an important figure.			
Leiochrodes haigi Pic, 1918	Beetle	Douglas Haig, 1st Earl Haig	The description of this species was published in France amid the celebrations for the Armistice of 11 November 1918, end of the hostilities of World War I, in which Haig was an important figure.			
Leiochrodes kitchneri Pic, 1918	Beetle	Horatio Herbert Kitchener, 1st Earl Kitchener	The description of this species was published in France amid the celebrations for the Armistice of 11 November 1918, end of the hostilities of World War I, in which Kitchener was an important figure.			
Leiorhagium korngoldi Haase & Bouchet, 1998	Freshwater snail	Erich Wolfgang Korngold	"dedicated to Erich Wolfgang Korngold (1897–1957), one of the favourite composers of the first author."			
Leiorhagium mussorgskyi Haase & Bouchet, 1998	Freshwater snail	Modest Mussorgsky	"named after one of the first author's favourite composers, Modest Mussorgsky (1839–1881)."			
Leistus becheti Allegro, 2007	Beetle	Sidney Bechet	"I dedicate this species to the saxophonist Sidney Bechet, the pioneer of soprano sax players in jazz."			
Lelapsomorpha myersi Girault, 1913	Wasp	Frederic W. H. Myers				
Leninia † Fischer et al., 2013	Ichthyosaur	Vladimir Lenin	"The museum where [the type specimen] is housed is located within the Lenin Memorial and Lenin school complex in Ulyanovsk; accordingly, the generic name reflects the geohistorical location of the find."			
Lepidoteuthis grimaldii Joubin, 1895	Squid	Albert I, Prince of Monaco	The prince was born Albert Grimaldi.			
Lepithrix freudi Schein, 1959	Beetle	Sigmund Freud				
Lepralia grimaldii Jullien, 1903	Bryozoan	Albert I, Prince of Monaco	The prince was born Albert Grimaldi. This species was collected by one of the prince's research yachts, the Hirondelle. Subsequently synonymised with Cheiloporina circumcincta.			
Leptacis kierkegaardi Buhl, 1997	Wasp	Søren Kierkegaard	The specimens used to describe this species (collected in New Guinea) were deposited in the University of Copenhagen Zoological Museum, Denmark.			
Leucothoe tolkieni Vinogradov, 1990	Crustacean	J. R. R. Tolkien				
Leviathan melvillei † Lambert et al., 2010	Whale	Herman Melville	A fossil sperm whale from the Miocene of Peru, dedicated to the author of Moby Dick. Genus Leviathan Lambert et al., 2010, created concurrently as a reference to the mythical Leviathan, was subsequently renamed as Livyatan (closer to the Hebrew word), as it was preoccupied by Leviathan Koch, 1841, a junior synonym of Mammut Blumenbach, 1799.			
Limitolagus roosevelti † Fostowicz-Frelik, 2013	Rabbit	Theodore Roosevelt	A fossil species of rabbit from the Eocene-Oligocene boundary of Wyoming, US, named "after Theodore Roosevelt, the 26th president of the United States of America and a keen naturalist."			
Lincolna Girault, 1940	Wasp	Abraham Lincoln				
Lincolnanna Girault, 1939	Wasp	Abraham Lincoln	This genus was subsequently synonymised with Pterisemoppa Girault, 1933.			
Liolaemus gardeli Varrastro, Maneyro, da Silva & Farias, 2017	Lizard	Carlos Gardel	"This new species is named after the famous Uruguayan tango singer, Carlos Gardel, who died in a plane crash in 1935. Gardel's birthplace was widely disputed and claimed by Uruguay, France, and Argentina, but recent research has confirmed that Gardel is the illegitimate son of a Uruguayan farmer. According to historical data from the book, Carlos Gardel – el silencio de Tacuarembó, authored by Selva Ortiz (1994), Gardel was born in the Tacuarembó Department (Uruguay), in the same region of the type locality of this newly described species." (Note: Gardel's birthplace is still controversial)			
Liphanthus yrigoyeni Packer, 2019	Bee	Hipólito Yrigoyen	A species from Argentina; "An alternative name for Iturbe, the type locality, is Hipólito Yrigoyen, after Juan Hipólito del Sagrado Corazón de Jesús Yrigoyen Alem, a progressive politician and two-time president of Argentina."			
Lithodes grimaldii A. Milne-Edwards & Bouvier, 1894	Crustacean	Albert I, Prince of Monaco	The prince was born Albert Grimaldi. Known as porcupine crab, this species of king crab was described from specimens collected by one of the prince's research yachts, the Hirondelle. Immediately after its formal description, in the appendix of the same paper, it was transferred to the newly created genus Neolithodes.			
Litomylus osceolae † Van Valen, 1978	Condylarth (an extinct order of mammals)	Osceola	A fossil mammal from the Paleocene of New Mexico. Subsequently transferred to the genus Hemithlaeus.			
Lophyrus victoria Fraser, 1844	Pigeon	Queen Victoria	A species of crowned pigeon from New Guinea, named "In honour of Her Most Gracious Majesty, the Patroness of the Society" (Zoological Society of London). Subsequently transferred to genus Goura.			
Lulavia mahwii Khudhur & Hausmann, 2024	Moth	Mahwi	A geometer moth native to the Kurdistan Region of Iraq, "named after Mahwi who was one of the most prominent classical Kurdish poet and Sufis from Kurdistan. Mahwi was always using "Parwana – in Kurdish" meaning "Moth" as moth and flame metaphor in his poems."			
Lumieria Benedetti & Pinto-da-Rocha, 2022	Harvestman	Lumière brothers	"derived from Auguste Marie Louis Nicholas Lumière (1862–1954) and Louis Jean Lumière (1864–1948), the Lumière brothers, who were the inventors of [the] cinematograph, being frequently referred like the parents of the "Cinema"."			
Luthulenchelys McCosker, 2007	Fish	Albert Luthuli	A genus of snake eels from the coast of KwaZulu-Natal, South Africa, named "in honour of Chief Albert John Mvumbi Luthuli of KwaZulu-Natal, Africa's first winner of the Nobel Peace Prize and former President of the African National Congress"			
Lycoriella pearyi Menzel & Vilkamaa, 2021	Fly	Robert Peary	A dark-winged fungus gnat native to Greenland, "named after the polar explorer Robert Edwin Peary (1856–1920), one of the pioneers in the study of Greenland."			
Lyngbya shackletoni West & G.S. West, 1911	Bacterium	Ernest Shackleton	A freshwater cyanobacterium native to Antarctica, described from specimens collected at Hut Point Peninsula by the Nimrod Expedition, led by Shackleton. Subsequently transferred to the genus Porphyrosiphon.			
Macellicephala grimaldii Fauvel, 1913	Polychaete worm	Albert I, Prince of Monaco	The prince was born Albert Grimaldi. This species of scale worm was described from specimens collected in the Bay of Biscay by two of the prince's research yachts, the Hirondelle and the Princesse Alice.			
Macrobiotus sklodowskae Michalczyk, Kaczmarek & Węglarska, 2006	Tardigrade	Marie Curie	A species from Cyprus described by Polish scientists and named "in recognition of the outstanding Polish scientist Maria Skłodowska-Curie (1867–1934) who co-discovered radium, polonium and natural radiation, the first woman to win the Nobel Prize and the first scientist to win two Nobel Prizes (1903 and 1911)."			
Macrocyphon deporti Pic, 1918	Beetle	Joseph-Albert Deport	The description of this species was published in France amid the celebrations for the Armistice of 11 November 1918, end of the hostilities of World War I, in which Deport's invention, the Canon de 75 modèle 1897, had been widely used by the French Army.			
Macrocyphon fochi Pic, 1918	Beetle	Ferdinand Foch	The description of this species was published in France amid the celebrations for the Armistice of 11 November 1918, end of the hostilities of World War I, in which Foch was an important figure.			
Macrocyphon ronarchi Pic, 1918	Beetle	Pierre Alexis Ronarc'h	The description of this species was published in France amid the celebrations for the Armistice of 11 November 1918, end of the hostilities of World War I, in which Ronarc'h was an important figure.			
Macropoliana haileselassiei Eitschberger & Melichar, 2016	Moth	Haile Selassie	A species native to Ethiopia and named "to commemorate the last regent of Ethiopia and the last Emperor of Abyssinia, who was born on 23.VII.1892 and died in captivity under mysterious circumstances on 27.VIII.1975 after doing nothing about the 1974 famine in the country and being deprived of power. He is said to have been the 225th successor of King Solomon."			
Macrostylis roaldi Riehl & Kaiser, 2012	Crustacean	Roald Amundsen	"dedicated to the Norwegian explorer Roald Amundsen, eponym of the type locality (Amundsen Sea), in order to mark the 100th anniversary of Amundsen as the first person to reach the geographic South Pole on December 14th 1911."			
Mahidolia H. M. Smith, 1932	Fish	Mahidol Adulyadej	A genus of gobies described from specimens collected in Thailand (then known as Siam). "The genus is named in honor of His Royal Highness Prince Mahidol of Songkla, deceased, in appreciation of his substantial interest in the fishes and fisheries of Siam. This interest was manifested in various ways, notably by the setting aside of a large fund for sending young Siamese abroad for special training in fishery work."			
Marginella roosevelti Bartsch & Rehder, 1939	Sea snail	Franklin D. Roosevelt	Described from specimens collected by the 1938 Presidential Cruise aboard USS Houston. Subsequently transferred to genus Prunum.			
Malthodes henningseni † Fanti & Damgaard, 2018	Beetle	Poul Henningsen	A fossil soldier beetle found in Baltic amber from the Eocene of Kaliningrad Oblast, "named in memory of the Danish author, critic, architect and designer Poul Henningsen [...], in recognition of his cultural contributions."			
Martesia tolkieni Kennedy, 1974	Bivalve	J. R. R. Tolkien				
Marxella Girault, 1932	Wasp	Karl Marx				
Marxiana Girault, 1932	Wasp	Karl Marx				
Mathilda (Fimbriatella) amundseni † Marincovich, 1993	Sea snail	Roald Amundsen	A fossil species from the Paleocene of Prince Creek Formation in Arctic Alaska, "named in honor of the Norwegian explorer Roald Amundsen, whose conquest of the Northwest Passage in the ship Gjøa ended in 1905 along the Arctic coast not far from Ocean Point." (the type locality)			
Mayopyge zapata † Adrain & Fortey 1997	Trilobite	Emiliano Zapata	"The pygidial spines droop in the style of a moustache."			
Membraniporella alice Jullien, 1903	Bryozoan	Alice, Princess of Monaco	Species described from specimens collected by one of Prince Albert I of Monaco's (Alice's husband) research yachts, the Hirondelle.			
Memorocyphon gallienii Pic, 1918	Beetle	Joseph Gallieni	The description of this species was published in France amid the celebrations for the Armistice of 11 November 1918, end of the hostilities of World War I, in which Gallieni was an important figure.			
Menura alberti Bonaparte, 1850	Bird	Albert, Prince Consort				
Merriamium roosevelti de Laubenfels, 1939	Sponge	Franklin D. Roosevelt	Described from specimens collected by the 1938 Presidential Cruise aboard USS Houston. Subsequently transferred to genus Lissodendoryx.			
Mesabolivar borgesi Huber, 2018	Spider	Jorge Luis Borges	This species is native to Argentina.			
Mesenteripora grimaldii Jullien, 1903	Bryozoan	Albert I, Prince of Monaco	The prince was born Albert Grimaldi. This species was described from specimens collected by one of the prince's research yachts, the Hirondelle.			
Metaeuchromius rizali Léger, 2024	Moth	José Rizal	This species is endemic to Luzon, Philippines.			
Metallonella longfellowi Girault, 1915	Wasp	Henry Wadsworth Longfellow	Subsequently transferred to genus Mesorhopella.			
Micromaldane shackletoni Darbyshire, 2013	Polychaete worm	Ernest Shackleton	A species from the Falkland Islands, "named after Sir Ernest Shackleton, Antarctic explorer, for whom the Shackleton Scholarship Fund is commemorated, in recognition of the Fund's support of this work."			
Microplitis kovalevskayae Kittel, 2016	Wasp	Sofya Kovalevskaya	Proposed as replacement name for Microplitis bicoloratus Chen, 2004, which was preoccupied by Microplitis bicoloratus Xu & He, 2003. However, it was later found that Microplitis bicoloratus Chen, 2004 is a junior synonym of Microplitis prodeniae Rao & Kurian, 1950, making Kittel's replacement name unnecessary.			
Microstomum tchaikovskyi Atherton & Jondelius, 2018	Flatworm	Pyotr Ilyich Tchaikovsky and Adrian Tchaikovsky	"This species is named in honor of Adrian Tchaikovsky, author, and Pyotr Ilyich Tchaikovsky, composer, whose audiobook and music respectively were much appreciated by the first author while sampling."			
Mimatuta makpialutae † Van Valen, 1978	Condylarth (an extinct order of mammals)	Red Cloud	A fossil mammal from the Paleocene of Wyoming, named after Red Cloud's Lakota name, Makhapialuta.			
Mirocossus chukovskyi Yakovlev, 2022	Moth	Korney Chukovsky	A species from Bioko island, Equatorial Guinea, described by a Russian scientist. "The new species is named after the famous Russian children's poet, essayist, literary critic, and translator Korney I. Chukovsky (1882-1969). In one of his most popular children's poems, "Doktor Aybolit [Dr. Ouch, [it] hurts!]" there are lines "We live in Zanzibar, In the Kalahari and the Sahara, On Mount Fernando Po, Where Hippo Po walks Along the wide Limpopo", reading which for the first time, the author of the article (at the age of five) became interested in the geography and nature of Africa, to the study of which he later devoted his life."			
Mischocyttarus verissimoi Silveira, 2015	Wasp	José Veríssimo	A paper wasp native to Brazil and Colombia, named "in homage to José Veríssimo Dias de Matos (1857–1916), a Brazilian writer and former director of the Pará State Board of Education who had a very important role in the reorganization of the Museu Paraense in 1891."			
Mistralia Fourr.	Flowering plant	Frédéric Mistral	A genus described from specimens collected in Provence, France, and "dedicate[d] [...] to the great Provençal poet F. Mistral, of Maillane, who celebrated in Mirèio the flora of the Crau, the Alpilles, and the Camargue."; Subsequently synonimised with Daphne.			
Mistralia Porto, Derkarabetian, Giribet & Pérez-González, 2024	Harvestman	Gabriela Mistral	This genus is native to Argentina and Chile.			
Mitra berlineri † Maury, 1917	Sea snail	Emile Berliner	A fossil species from the Pliocene of the Dominican Republic. "I take the greatest pleasure in naming this splendid Mitra in honor of Mr. Emile Berliner, of Washington, D.C., as a slight token of appreciation of his generous gift of the Sarah Berliner Foundation, which has made this work possible."			
Monetianthus † E.M.Friis et al.	Flowering plant	Claude Monet	A genus of fossil aquatic plants related to water lilies, from the Cretaceous of Portugal, whose name derives "From the French impressionist artist Claude Monet, in appreciation of his paintings of water lilies."			
Muntiacus rooseveltorum Osgood, 1932	Deer	Theodore Roosevelt Jr. and Kermit Roosevelt				
Mymar tyndalli Girault, 1912	Wasp	John Tyndall	Subsequently synonymised with Mymar taprobanicum Ward, 1875.			
Myrmarachne coppeti Berland & Millot, 1941	Spider	Jules Marcel de Coppet	A species of jumping spider that mimics ants, described from a specimen collected in Senegal, where Coppet had been colonial governor-general (as part of French West Africa). Subsequently synonymised with Myrmarachne elongata.			
Myrmica gallienii Bondroit, 1920	Ant	Joseph Gallieni	"named for the controversial World War I French General Joseph Gallieni (1849-1916) who won an early victory over the Germans "that saved Paris". To some people, probably including Bondroit, who may have served under him, Gallieni was the "Hero of the Marne" (type locality of the species)"			
Nabokovia Hemming, 1960	Butterfly	Vladimir Nabokov	A nomen novum for a genus Nabokov previously named.			
Nannenus maughami Prószyński & Deeleman-Reinhold, 2012	Spider	W. Somerset Maugham	A species of jumping spider native to Sumatra, Indonesia.			
Nannospalax gazii Matur et al., 2026	Rodent	Mustafa Kemal Atatürk	A blind mole-rat from Anatolia, Turkey; "The name gazii is derived from the Turkish honorary title "Gazi," meaning "veteran" or "warrior," and is proposed in tribute to Gazi Mustafa Kemal Atatürk (1881–1938), the founding father of the Republic of Türkiye. The name symbolically reflects resilience and perseverance, traits metaphorically associated with both the subterranean lifestyle of blind mole rats and Atatürk's enduring legacy in the establishment of modern Turkish science, education, and national sovereignty."			
Nanocthulhu lovecrafti Buffington, 2012	Wasp	H. P. Lovecraft	The genus name invokes Lovecraft's character Cthulhu			
Navicula (Pinnularia) shackletoni West & G.S. West	Diatom	Ernest Shackleton	A freshwater species native to Antarctica, described from specimens collected at Cape Royds by the Nimrod Expedition, led by Shackleton. The subgenus Pinnularia was subsequently elevated to genus status.			
Neanastatus reymondi Girault, 1915	Wasp	Paul du Bois-Reymond				
Neanthes roosevelti Hartman, 1939	Polychaete worm	Franklin D. Roosevelt	Described from specimens collected by the 1938 Presidential Cruise aboard USS Houston.			
Neapterolelaps lodgei Girault, 1913	Wasp	Oliver Lodge	"Respectfully dedicated to Sir Oliver J. Lodge for his interest in and contributions to a difficult field of Psychology, one of the highest importance to mankind but of the least acknowledged."			
Nearretocera johnstoni Girault, 1913	Wasp	Mary Johnston	"This beautiful species is respectfully dedicated to Mary Johnston for her war-incriminating novel Cease Firing."			
Neobisium chaimweizmanni Ćurčić & Dimitrijević, 2002	Pseudoscorpion	Chaim Weizmann	"After the name of a famous chemist and statesman, otherwise the first President of Israel."			
Neobisium davidbengurioni Ćurčić & Dimitrijević, 2002	Pseudoscorpion	David Ben-Gurion	"After the name of a noted politician and publicist, David BenGurion, otherwise the first Prime Minister of Israel."			
Neobisium goldameirae Ćurčić & Dimitrijević, 2002	Pseudoscorpion	Golda Meir	"After the name of the Mother of Israel, Ms. Golda Meir, a noted Israeli politician and the former Prime Minister of the country."			
Neobisium marcchagalli Ćurčić & Ćurčić, 2002	Pseudoscorpion	Marc Chagall	"After the name of Marc Chagall, a famous Russian-Jewish painter."			
Neomegamphopus roosevelti Shoemaker, 1942	Crustacean	Franklin D. Roosevelt	An amphipod described from specimens collected by the 1938 Presidential Cruise aboard USS Houston. "I take great pleasure in naming this species for the Hon. Franklin D. Roosevelt, President of the United States of America, in appreciation of his interest in the biological bollections of the U.S. National Museum".			
Neomerinthe hemingwayi Fowler, 1935	Fish	Ernest Hemingway	A species of scorpionfish from the Atlantic Ocean, known as spiny-cheek scorpionfish. It is the type species of its genus. "For Ernest Hemingway, author and angler of great game fishes, in appreciation of his assistance in my work on Gulf Stream fishes."			
Neozygina zapatai Dietrich & Dmitriev, 2007	Leafhopper	Emiliano Zapata	A species native to Jalisco, Mexico, "named in memory of Emilano Zapata Salazar (1879–1919), hero of the Mexican Revolution."			
Nephelomys ricardopalmai Ruelas, Pacheco, Inche & Tinoco, 2021	Rodent	Ricardo Palma	A rice rat from Peruvian Amazonia, named "in honor of the Peruvian politician, journalist, and writer Ricardo Palma Soriano (1833–1919). Among his main achievements, Ricardo Palma is recognized for the foundation of the Academia Peruana de la Lengua, for his traditional writing about the Peruvian customs represented in his well-known Tradiciones Peruanas, and for the reconstruction of the National Library after the War of the Pacific (1879–1883) as part of the post-war national reconstruction, for which he was named as "El Bibliotecario mendigo" ("The beggar Librarian"). In this war, the original manuscript of his novel Los Marañones was burned [...], which was said to narrate the Spanish explorer's adventures and rebel conquistador [sic] Lope de Aguirre in the Peruvian Amazonian."			
Neptunides stanleyi Janson, 1984	Beetle	Henry Morton Stanley	A flower chafer beetle first collected near Boyoma Falls (then known as Stanley Falls), in the present-day Democratic Republic of the Congo. "I propose naming this fine species after the illustrious leader of the Emin Pasha Relief Expedition and explorer of Central Africa."; Subsequently transferred to genus Taurhina.			
Nietzscheana Zubov, 2014	Beetle	Friedrich Nietzsche	This genus was subsequently synonymised with the species Saperda alberti.			
Noctua fransenii Schlegel, 1866	Owl	Isaäc Dignus Fransen van de Putte	"The epithet, conferred on this very rare species, is attached to the name of His Excellency the present Minister of the Colonies, Mr. Fransen van de Putte, who was kind enough to authorise the continuation of the exploration of New Guinea and of the research aimed at making the natural history of our Archipelago known." Subsequently synonymised with Ninox rufa subsp. humeralis.			
Notiomaso shackletoni Lavery & Snazell, 20134	Spider	Ernest Shackleton	A money spider from the Falkland Islands, whose name refers "to the links between the Shackleton family and the Falkland Islands. Sir Ernest Shackleton (1874–1922) visited the islands during his epic rescue of the crew of the Endurance in 1915."			
Notothenia scotti Boulenger, 1907	Fish	Robert Falcon Scott	Known as crowned rockcod, this is a species of cod icefish from the Southern Ocean, first collected by the Discovery Expedition, led by Scott. It was subsequently transferred to the genus Trematomus.			
Nyctalus joffrei Thomas, 1915	Bat	Joseph Joffre	"The species is named in honour of General Joffre, Commander-in-Chief of the French Army."; This species was named during World War I, in which Joffre was an important figure. Known as Joffre's pipistrelle, it has since been moved to the genus Mirostrellus. It is found in Southeast Asia, from Nepal to Vietnam.			
Odontophorus balliviani Gould, 1846	Fowl	José Ballivián	The stripe-faced wood quail, native to Bolivia and Peru, was named after General Ballivián, who was President of Bolivia at the time of publication.			
Odontophotopsis hammetti Pitts, 2010	Velvet ant	Dashiell Hammett	A species from the Colorado Desert, California, "Named after Samuel Dashiell Hammett (1894–1961), who was a well-known American author of hardboiled detective novels and short stories, and creator of the famous protagonist, Sam Spade."			
Odynerus (Ancistrocerus) kitcheneri Dusmet, 1917	Wasp	Horatio Herbert Kitchener, 1st Earl Kitchener	"Dedicated to the English Field Marshal Lord Kitchener, who died on 5 June 1916, when the cruiser Hampshire sank." This species was named during World War I, in which Kitchener was an important figure. Subsequently, subgenus Ancistrocerus was elevated to the rank of genus.			
Odynerus (Hoplomerus) goltzi Dusmet, 1917	Wasp	Colmar Freiherr von der Goltz	"Dedicated to the German General Von Goltz, reorganizer of the Turkish army." This species was named during World War I, in which Goltz was an important figure. Subsequently transferred to subgenus Monoplomerus.			
Odynerus (Hoplomerus) wilhelmi Dusmet, 1917	Wasp	Wilhelm II, German Emperor	This species was named during World War I, in which Wilhelm II was an important figure. Subsequently transferred to subgenus Spinocoxa.			
Odynerus (Lionotus) alberti Dusmet, 1917	Wasp	Albert I of Belgium	This species was named during World War I, in which Albert I was an important figure. Subsequently transferred to genus Antepipona.			
Odynerus (Lionotus) brussiloffi Dusmet, 1917	Wasp	Aleksei Brusilov	"Dedicated to the Russian General Brussiloff, who in 1916 conquered Bukovina and part of Volhynia." This species was named during World War I, in which Brusilov was an important figure. Subsequently transferred to genus Leptochilus.			
Odynerus (Lionotus) falkenhayni Dusmet, 1917	Wasp	Erich von Falkenhayn	"Dedicated to the German Marshal Falkenhayn, who conquered Romania at the end of 1916." This species was named during World War I, in which Falkenhayn was an important figure. Subsequently reclassified as a subspecies of Leptochilus medanae.			
Odynerus (Lionotus) frenchi Dusmet, 1917	Wasp	John French, 1st Earl of Ypres	"Dedicated to General John French, who commanded for a long time the English armies in France." This species was named during World War I, in which French was an important figure. Subsequently transferred to genus Pseudoleptochilus.			
Odynerus (Lionotus) hindenburgi Dusmet, 1917	Wasp	Paul von Hindenburg	"Dedicated to the German Marshal Hindenburg, victor of Augustów [sic; probably meant Tannenberg] and the Masurian Lakes and conqueror of Poland." This species was named during World War I, in which Hindenburg was an important figure. Subsequently transferred to genus Pseudosymmorphus.			
Odynerus (Lionotus) hoetzendorfi Dusmet, 1917	Wasp	Franz Conrad von Hötzendorf	"Dedicated to General Conrad von Hötzendorf, Chief of Staff of the Austrian armies." This species was named during World War I, in which Hötzendorf was an important figure. Subsequently transferred to genus Microdynerus.			
Odynerus (Lionotus) koenigi Dusmet, 1917	Wasp	Paul König	"Dedicated to Herr König, commander of the merchant submarine Deutschland, which on 10 July 1916 arrived in the United States, crossing the Atlantic for the first time." Subsequently transferred to genus Allodynerus.			
Odynerus (Lionotus) mackenseni Dusmet, 1917	Wasp	August von Mackensen	"Dedicated to the German General Mackensen, conqueror of Poland and Serbia." This species was named during World War I, in which Mackensen was an important figure. Subsequently transferred to genus Chlorodynerus.			
Odynerus (Lionotus) muelleri Dusmet, 1917	Wasp	Karl von Müller	"Dedicated to Captain Müller, who, with the German cruiser Emden made a remarkable campaign in the Indian Ocean." This species was named during World War I, in which Müller was an important figure. Subsequently transferred to genus Stenodynerus.			
Odynerus (Lionotus) romanoffi Dusmet, 1917	Wasp	Grand Duke Nicholas Nikolaevich of Russia (1856–1929)	"Dedicated to H.H. the Grand Duke Nicholas Michailovitch [sic] Romanoff of Russia, for some time commander in chief of the Russian Armies." This species was named during World War I, in which Duke Nicholas was an important figure. Subsequently transferred to genus Antepipona.			
Odynerus (Lionotus) weddigeni Dusmet, 1917	Wasp	Otto Weddigen	"Dedicated to the German lieutenant Weddigen who, with the submarine U-9, sank, on 22 September 1914, the British cruisers Aboukir, Hogue and Crecy [sic]" This species was named during World War I, in which Weddigen was an important figure. Subsequently transferred to genus Leptochilus.			
Odynerus (Microdynerus) leopoldi Dusmet, 1917	Wasp	Prince Leopold of Bavaria	"Dedicated to Prince Leopold of Bavaria, conqueror of Warsaw." This species was named during World War I, in which Prince Leopold was an important figure. Subsequently synonymised with Microdynerus abdelkader.			
Odynerus (Microdynerus) ludendorffi Dusmet, 1917	Wasp	Erich Ludendorff	"Dedicated to the German General Ludendorff, Marshal Hindenburg's Chief of Staff." This species was named during World War I, in which Ludendorff was an important figure. Subsequently reclassified as Alastorynerus ludendorffi.			
Odynerus (Microdynerus) russky Dusmet, 1917	Wasp	Nikolai Ruzsky	"Dedicated to the Russian General Russky, victor of the battles of Lemberg on September 1914." This species was named during World War I, in which Ruzsky was an important figure. Subsequently synonymised with Microdynerus timidus.			
Oedichirus hochimini Rougemont, 2018	Beetle	Ho Chi Minh	This species is native to Vietnam.			
Ogyges sandinoi Cano, 2014	Beetle	Augusto César Sandino	"The name of this species is in honor of Augusto César Sandino, a Nicaraguan hero, born in the Segovia Mountains."; All the specimens used to describe this species were collected from a mountain in Nueva Segovia Department, Nicaragua. Sandino was actually born further South, but it was in Las Segovias that he started recruiting his army.			
Oligosita poincarei Girault, 1913	Wasp	Henri Poincaré				
Ommatophoca rossii Gray, 1844	Seal	James Clark Ross	Described from specimens collected by the Ross expedition.			
Onchopora grimaldii Jullien, 1903	Bryozoan	Albert I, Prince of Monaco	The prince was born Albert Grimaldi. This species was described from specimens collected by one of the prince's research yachts, the Hirondelle.			
Onychodus jandemarrai † Andrews et al., 2006	Fish	Jandamarra	A fossil lobe-finned fish from the Devonian of Kimberley (Western Australia). "Jandemarra was the name of the Aboriginal warrior who fought for Aboriginal rights in the Kimberleys and lived in caves in the Devonian reefs."			
Opacuincola johannstraussi Haase, 2008	Freshwater snail	Johann Strauss II	"This species is named after the King of Waltz, the composer Johann Strauß II (1825-1899). This dedication has been inspired by the name of the type locality [a stream in Ballroom Cave, Aorere Valley, New Zealand ]."			
Opacuincola eduardstraussi Haase, 2008	Freshwater snail	Eduard Strauss	"Eduard Strauß (1835-1916) was the youngest, also composing and conducting brother of Johann Strauß II. This species is named after Eduard because of its similarity to O. johannstraussi."			
Opacuincola josefstraussi Haase, 2008	Freshwater snail	Josef Strauss	"Josef Strauß (1827-1870) was the middle of the Strauß brothers, composing and conducting as well. This name has again been chosen because the species occurs in Ballroom Cave and because it is sympatric with O. johannstraussi."			
Opheliminus longfellowi Girault, 1913	Wasp	Henry Wadsworth Longfellow	Ganus Opheliminus was subsequently synonimised with Sympiesis.			
Opisthoproctus grimaldii Zugmayer, 1911	Fish	Albert I, Prince of Monaco	The prince was born Albert Grimaldi. Known as mirrorbelly, this species of barreleye was described from specimens first collected by one of the prince's research yachts, the Princesse Alice. Subsequently transferred to the genus Monacoa.			
Opius (Tolbia) karlmayi Fischer, 2014	Wasp	Karl May	"Named on the occasion of the 100th anniversary of the death of youth writer Karl May (died 1912)."			
Orbiniella griegi Meca & Budaeva, 2024	Polychaete worm	Edvard Grieg	A species found on the coasts of Norway and Iceland, and "named in honour of Edvard Grieg, the Norwegian musician born and raised in Bergen, the city where the present study [i.e. the paper containing the species' description] was conducted."			
Orcevia nietzschei Yu, Maddison & Zhang, 2023	Spider	Friedrich Nietzsche	"in honor of the German philosopher Friedrich W. Nietzsche, whose works have exerted a profound influence on contemporary philosophy and have given tremendous inspiration to the first author."			
Orcus nietzschei Łączyński, 2012	Ladybird	Friedrich Nietzsche	"This species is dedicated to the memory of a great German philosopher, Friedrich Nietzsche, who devoted his life to understanding the nature of will and morality."			
Ornismya anna Lesson, 1829	Bird	Anna Masséna, Duchess of Rivoli	This species has since been transferred to the genus Calypte.			
Oxyacodon josephi † Van Valen, 1978	Condylarth (an extinct order of mammals)	Chief Joseph	A fossil mammal from the Paleocene of Wyoming. Subsequently transferred to the genus Hemithlaeus.			
Oxyethira (Loxotrichia) gracilianoi Souza & Santos, 2017	Caddisfly	Graciliano Ramos	A Brazilian microcaddisfly "named in memory of Graciliano Ramos (1852–1953). Graciliano was author of such Brazilian classic literature as Caetés (1933) and Vidas Secas (1938). Graciliano was born in the city of Quebrangulo, type locality of this new species."			
Oxynoemacheilus theophilii Stoumboudi, Kottelat & Barbieri, 2006	Fish	Theophilos Hatzimihail	This freshwater stone loach was described from specimens collected in the Greek island of Lesbos, where Theophilos was born.			
Ozanna roosevelti Heller, 1910	Antelope	Kermit Roosevelt	"Named for Kermit Roosevelt, to whose indefatigable energy many of the rarer species of big game in the collection are due." Roosevelt had collected the holotype during the Smithsonian–Roosevelt African expedition in British East Africa (present-day Kenya). Genus Ozanna was subsequently synonymised with Hippotragus, and this animal was reclassified as a subspecies of the Sable antelope, with the name Hippotragus niger roosevelti.			
Pachyrhynchus rizali Schultze, 1934	Beetle	José Rizal	This weevil species is endemic to Luzon island, Philippines.			
Paedasterias joffrei Koehler 1920	Starfish	Joseph Joffre	"It pleased me, in writing my memoir at the beginning of 1919, to recall, in the name applied to the first new species described here, the absolute and complete victory won by France and her Allies [...]. I have also taken the liberty of dedicating two other new species to the two great men of war to whom we owe the victory, I have named Marechal Joffre and Marechal Foch [see Podasterias fochi], those two beautiful glories of France, whose valour fills every Frenchman's heart with admiration and gratitude." Subsequently, genus Paedasterias was synonymised with Lysasterias.			
Pamphobeteus matildeae Sherwood et al., 2023	Spider	Matilde Hidalgo	A tarantula from Ecuador named "in honour of Matilde Hidalgo Navarro [...], physician, politician, poet, and activist who was a trailblazer for women's rights in Ecuador. She was the first woman to cast a vote in a national election in Latin America, the first Ecuadorian woman to receive a doctorate in medicine, and the first woman to hold an elected office in Ecuador."			
Pamphobeteus nellieblyae Sherwood, Gabriel, Brescovit & Lucas, 2022	Spider	Nellie Bly	A tarantula from Ecuador named "in honour of Elizabeth Jane Cochrane (1864–1922), who was better known as Nellie Bly (her nom de plume), the first woman to circumnavigate the globe. Bly emulated the trip of fictional explorer Phileas Fogg in Jules Verne's Around the World in Eighty Days and managed to complete the journey in just 72 days, which was, at the time, a world record."			
Pancorius tagorei Prószyński, 1992	Spider	Rabindranath Tagore	An Indian jumping spider native to West Bengal, Tagore's home state.			
Papilio (Ornithoptera) victoriae Gray, 1856	Butterfly	Queen Victoria	A large butterfly found in the Solomon Islands and Bougainville Island, Papua New Guinea. Subsequently transferred to the genus Troides, and then back to Ornithoptera, which was elevated to genus level.			
Paradisornis rudolphi Finsch & A.B. Meyer, 1885	Bird	Rudolf, Crown Prince of Austria	The blue bird-of-paradise, endemic to Papua New Guinea, was named "In honour of His Imperial and Royal Highness the Lord Archduke Rudolf, Crown Prince of Austria, the high and mighty protector of ornithological research throughout the world"			
Paraenasomyia johnsoni Girault, 1922	Wasp	Jack Johnson (boxer)	dedicated to "A man allied with Heaven, pugilistic, fashionable, dissipated, improvident, and non-poetical."			
Paraleptomastix thoreauini Girault, 1915	Wasp	Henry David Thoreau	Subsequently transferred to genus Neocladia.			
Paranthemus spenceri Girault, 1915	Wasp	Herbert Spencer	Genus Paranthemus was subsequently synonymised with Cales.			
Paraschistura delvarii Mousavi-Sabet & Eagderi, 2015	Fish	Rais-Ali Delvari	"The species name delvarii is in honor of "Rais-Ali Delvari" (1882 – 1915), the anti-colonialism [sic] in Bushehr province, the region where the Mond River drainage (type locality of P. delvarii) is located. Rais-Ali Delvari now remembered [sic] as the national hero of Iran."			
Parasecodella dickensi Girault, 1915	Wasp	Charles Dickens				
Pardiaulomella ibseni Girault, 1916	Wasp	Henrik Ibsen	Genus Pardiaulomella was subsequently synonymised with Sympiesis.			
Pardosa mabinii Barrion & Litsinger, 1995	Spider	Apolinario Mabini	This species is endemic to the Philippines.			
Pardosa royi Biswas & Raychaudhuri, 2003	Spider	Prafulla Chandra Roy	A wolf spider native to Bangladesh, where Roy was born.			
Pardosa sacayi Barrion & Litsinger, 1995	Spider	Macario Sakay	This species is endemic to the Philippines. Subsequently synonymised with Venatrix magkasalubonga.			
Parectromoidella thackerayi Girault, 1915	Wasp	William Makepeace Thackeray	"Dedicated to the author of Vanity Fair."			
Paroecanthus roosevelti Rehn, 1917	Cricket	Theodore Roosevelt	"We take pleasure in dedicating this very interesting form to Theodore Roosevelt, in token of our appreciation of his scholarship as a zoologist and a historian and ability as a statesman. The name Roosevelt long will be associated with the Madeiran region as a result of the work of the Expediçao Cientifica Roosevelt-Rondon."; Subsequently transferred to the genus Angustitrella.			
Paruscanoidea dickensi Girault, 1915	Wasp	Charles Dickens				
Parvodus graciliani † de Souza Ribeiro & Gallo de França, 2026	Shark	Graciliano Ramos	A fossil from the Jurassic of Brazil. "The specific epithet graciliani honors the Brazilian writer Graciliano Ramos (1892–1953), author of the novel Vidas Secas [...]. This work, which portrays the lives of northeastern Brazilians, has become a symbol of human resilience in the face of the adversities of the Sertão (backlands). The name also alludes to the paleobiogeographic distribution of the genus Parvodus, whose species are known from Europe and Asia. This discovery represents the first recorded occurrence in South America and the first formally species proposed for Gondwana. Thus, the epithet figuratively evokes the notion of a fossil one that traversed great distances through geological time before being found in the ancient environments of northeastern Brazil."			
Passadena mistralae Cepeda, 2018	Moth	Gabriela Mistral	A species of snout moth from Chile, whose name "honors Chilean Gabriela Mistral (1889–1957), the first Latin American woman awarded the Nobel Prize in Literature."			
Pediobopsis spenceri Girault, 1913	Wasp	Herbert Spencer				
Peloridinannus moe Weirauch & Frankenberg, 2015	True bug	Moe Howard	One of three schizopterid bugs named concurrently after the 1932–1946 Three Stooges (see also List of organisms named after famous people (born 1900–1924)), because of their "comical appearance".			
Petaloconchus laddfranklinae † Maury, 1917	Sea snail	Christine Ladd-Franklin	A fossil species from the Pliocene of the Dominican Republic. Ladd-Franklin was the first chair of the awarding committee of the Sarah Berliner Research Fellowship, which funded the expedition.			
Phaon rasoherinae Fraser, 1949	Damselfly	Rasoherina	This species is native to Madagascar.			
Pheidole roosevelti Mann, 1921	Ant	Theodore Roosevelt				
Pheretima aguinaldoi Hong & James, 2010	Earthworm	Emilio Aguinaldo	This species is endemic to the Philippines.			
Philodina shackletoni Iakovenko et al., 2015	Rotifer	Ernest Shackleton	"Named in honor of the leading Antarctic explorer, Sir Ernest Henry Shackleton, who in 1909 established his base on Cape Royds where the species was discovered."			
Phintella conradi Prószyński & Deeleman-Reinhold, 2012	Spider	Joseph Conrad	A species of jumping spider native to Sumatra, Indonesia, "named after Joseph Conrad (Józef Teodor Konrad Korzeniowski, 1857–1924) – a Polish novelist who wrote in English, and for many years was a Merchant Navy captain sailing around the Malay Archipelago, as described in his novels."			
Phoebeannaia mossae † Caron, Venkataraman, Tietjen & Coates, 2023	Fish	Phoebe Anna Traquair	A fossil of an early ray-finned fish from the Carboniferous of England, named "in recognition of Phoebe Anna Traquair née Moss (1852–1936), internationally recognized Scottish artist of the Arts and Crafts movement [...] and illustrator of foundational works on Palaeozoic actinopterygians, including 'Ganoid fishes of the British Carboniferous' (Traquair, 1911)."			
Pholcus hochiminhi Yao, Pham & Li, 2015	Spider	Ho Chi Minh	A cellar spider native to Vietnam.			
Pholcus lanieri Huber, 2011	Spider	Sidney Lanier	A cellar spider native to Georgia, USA.			
Photinus diegoriverai Zaragoza-Caballero & Domínguez-León, 2023	Firefly	Diego Rivera	This species is native to Mexico.			
Phyllium bonifacioi Lit & Eusebio, 2014	Leaf insect	Andrés Bonifacio	This species, native to the Philippines, was dedicated in commemoration of the 150th anniversary of Bonifacio's birth on November 30, 2013.			
Phyllontocheila mussolinii Mancini 1939	True bug	Benito Mussolini	This species of lace bug, native to Ethiopia, was described during the period of Italian colonialism proclaimed by Mussolini. Subsequently transferred to genus Ammianus.			
Picassocrinus † Cole et al., 2017	Sea lily	Pablo Picasso	A fossil genus of crinoids from the Ordovician of Zaragoza, Spain, named "in recognition of the Spanish abstract artist Pablo Picasso and in reference to the atypical plating of the posterior interray"			
Piestopleura milnei Buhl, 1997	Wasp	A. A. Milne				
Pimoa gandhii Hormiga, 1994	Spider	Mahatma Gandhi	The holotype was collected in Pahalgam, India.			
Pipistrellus kitcheneri Thomas, 1915	Bat	Horatio Herbert Kitchener, 1st Earl Kitchener	This species was named during World War I, in which Kitchener was an important figure. Known as the red-brown pipistrelle, it has since been moved to the genus Hypsugo. It is endemic to the island of Borneo.			
Pipistrellus sturdeei † Thomas, 1915	Bat	Doveton Sturdee	This species was named during World War I, in which Sturdee was an important figure. Known as Sturdee's pipistrelle or Bonin pipistrelle, the only documented specimen ever found (in Hahajima island, Japan) is the one that Thomas used to describe the species, which has since been declared officially extinct. Later scholarship has placed doubt on the validity of this single specimen's origin and taxonomy.			
Pisaboa fombonai Huber, 2020	Spider	Rufino Blanco Fombona	"This species is named for Rufino Blanco Fombona (1874–1944), Venezuela-born writer, nominated six times for the Nobel Prize in Literature between 1928 and 1935."			
Platymantis quezoni Brown et al., 2015	Frog	Manuel L. Quezon	A forest frog from Quezon, Philippines, named "honoring Manuel Luis Molina Quezon. Quezon served as president of the Commonwealth of the Philippines during the American colonial period from 1935 through the conclusion of the Second World War. An exemplary statesman, he led the struggle for Philippine independence from American rule. Suggested common name: Quezon Limestone Forest Frog."			
Platyptilia stanleyi Ustjuzhanin & Kovtunovich, 2016	Moth	Henry Morton Stanley	A large plume moth from Rwenzori Mountains, Uganda, "named after the famous British traveler, journalist and explorer of Africa, Henry Morton Stanley, the first European who visited the Rwenzori Mountains in 1876."			
Pleisticanthoides piccardorum Ng & Richer de Forges, 2012	Crustacean	Auguste Piccard and Jacques Piccard	"The name honors the Piccard family, Auguste Piccard (1884–1962), the inventor of the bathyscaphe, and his son, Jacques Ernest-Jean Piccard (1922–2008), who, together with U.S. Navy officer Don Walsh, were the first men to dive to a record depth of 10,915 m in the Mariana Trench in the Trieste on January 23, 1960."			
Podasterias fochi Koehler 1920	Starfish	Ferdinand Foch	"It pleased me, in writing my memoir at the beginning of 1919, to recall, in the name applied to the first new species described here, the absolute and complete victory won by France and her Allies [...]. I have also taken the liberty of dedicating two other new species to the two great men of war to whom we owe the victory, I have named Marechal Joffre [see Paedasterias joffrei] and Marechal Foch, those two beautiful glories of France, whose valour fills every Frenchman's heart with admiration and gratitude." Subsequently synonymised with Diplasterias brucei.			
Poecilia limantouri Jordan & Snyder, 1899	Fish	José Yves Limantour	"We take pleasure in dedicating this pretty fish to Señor Jose Yves de Limantour, the accomplished minister of the "Hacienda" for Mexico, in recognition of favors received through his courtesy." Subsequently synonymized with Poecilia mexicana.			
Poecilimon ataturki Ünal, 2000	Katydid	Mustafa Kemal Atatürk	"This interesting new species is named in honor of the first president of Turkey, Mustafa Kemal Atatürk, who founded the modern Turkish Republic in 1923."; The species is native to western Turkey.			
Pogonophryne scotti Regan, 1914	Fish	Robert Falcon Scott	Known as saddleback plunderfish, this is a species of Antarctic fish that was first collected by the Terra Nova Expedition, led by Scott, and was named in his memory.			
Polycystoides tennysoni Girault, 1913	Wasp	Alfred, Lord Tennyson	Subsequently transferred to genus Psilocera.			
Polynema draperi Girault, 1912	Wasp	John William Draper	"Dedicated to John William Draper, the physiologist, who has shown so clearly that civilisations, societies and all human populations are as immutably ruled by natural law as is the development of the individual human or the evolution of a species of bird or plant. The works of this man are neglected by nations at their peril."			
Polynema lodgei Girault, 1913	Wasp	Oliver Lodge	"This truly remarkable species, a striking example of the development of a similar wing pattern in unrelated genera, is respectfully dedicated to Sir Oliver W. [wrong initial] Lodge for his part in the development of a difficult part of human psychology, namely, that relating to telepathy and prevision." Subsequently transferred to genus Agalmopolynema.			
Polynema mendeleefi Girault, 1913	Wasp	Dmitri Mendeleev	"Respectfully dedicated to the Russian chemist who propounded the periodic law in chemistry." Subsequently transferred to genus Palaeoneura.			
Polynema nordaui Girault, 1913	Wasp	Max Nordau	Subsequently transferred to genus Palaeoneura.			
Polynema poincarei Girault, 1913	Wasp	Henri Poincaré	"This remarkable species is dedicated to the great French mathematician, Jules Henri Poincaré."; Subsequently transferred to genus Palaeoneura.			
Polynema spenceri Girault, 1912	Wasp	Herbert Spencer	"Respectfully dedicated to Herbert Spencer, great philosopher and forceful exponent of reason as based on experience." Subsequently transferred to genus Palaeoneura.			
Polynema thoreauini Girault, 1915	Wasp	Henry David Thoreau	Subsequently transferred to genus Palaeoneura.			
Polynema zangwilli Girault, 1913	Wasp	Israel Zangwill	Subsequently transferred to the genus Palaeoneura.			
Polynema zolai Girault, 1915	Wasp	Émile Zola	"Respectfully dedicated to Émile Zola for his La Débâcle, wherein the horrors of war are ably pictured to us." Subsequently transferred to the genus Palaeoneura.			
Polynemoidea lincolni Girault, 1913	Wasp	Abraham Lincoln	Subsequently transferred to genus Pseudanaphes.			
Polytelis alexandrae Gould, 1863	Parrot	Alexandra of Denmark	An Australian species known as princess parrot, and named "in honour of that Princess who, we may reasonably hope, is destined at some future time to be queen of these realms and their dependencies, of which Australia is by no means the most inconspicuous."			
Pomboa Huber, 2000	Spider	Rafael Pombo	"The generic name honors the Colombian poet Rafael Pombo, loved by children for his "El Renacuajo paseador" ("The Strolling Frog")."			
Potentilla regis-borisii Stoj.	Flowering plant	Boris III of Bulgaria	A species of cinquefoil endemic to the Balkan peninsula, described during Tsar Boris III's reign in Bulgaria and named in his honour. Subsequently transferred to genus Drymocallis.			
Potteromyces † Strullu-Derrien & Hawksworth, 2023	Fungus	Beatrix Potter	"In honor of Helen Beatrix Potter (1866–1943) the well-known children's author, conservationist, and amateur naturalist, who used her artistic abilities to draw and document a variety of Fungi. She made detailed observations and was one of the first mycologists to study the growth of fungi from spores in culture and to understand that lichens were an association between an alga and a fungus. She also had a keen interest in fossils. She was a critical observer of fungi microscopically making novel and at the time controversial observations. Her contribution really merits acknowledgment in the fungal kingdom."			
Pristimantis matildae Székely et al., 2020	Frog	Matilde Hidalgo	This species is endemic to Ecuador and was named after Matilde Hidalgo, "the first woman to obtain a medical degree in the country, and the first woman in Ecuador (and Latin America) to exercise the right to vote in a national election. A tireless fighter for women's rights, she laid important foundations for the development of women in academia and science, nationally and in South America. In Ecuador, there are currently many women involved in biological sciences and with this species, in addition to being a tribute to Matilde, we honor their tireless work for the conservation of biological diversity."			
Pristimantis teslai Páez & Ron, 2019	Frog	Nikola Tesla	"The specific epithet [...] is a patronym for Nikola Tesla, a revolutionary inventor of the late 19th and early 20th century. It is named after him in recognition of his contributions to physics and his dedication to the ideal of providing free wireless electric power" The common name "Tesla's rain frog" was proposed for this species, native to Ecuador.			
Pristionchus maxplancki Kanzaki et al., 2013	Roundworm	Max Planck	"The specific name [...] commemorates the German physicist Max Planck, the honorary namesake of the Society that sponsored this work."			
Pristomerus nedkellyi Klopfstein, 2016	Wasp	Ned Kelly	This species is native to Australia.			
Proplina sibeliusi † Stinchcomb, 1986	Monoplacophoran, a primitive class of molluscs	Jean Sibelius	A fossil species from the Early Ordovician of Missouri, US. "The species name is in honor of J. Sibelius, Finnish composer, whose first symphony and other works have evoked personal feelings comparable to those evoked by local Ozark landscapes developed on the gnarled, stromatolitic cherts of the Gasconade Formation where the form has been collected."			
Protelenomus lutulii Veenakumari, 2019	Wasp	Albert Luthuli	A species from South Africa named "after Albert John Lutuli, the first African, and the first person from outside Europe and the Americas, to receive the Nobel Peace Prize."			
Protopliomerella okeeffeae † McAdams & Adrain, 2011	Trilobite	Georgia O'Keeffe				
Protula alberti Fauvel, 1909	Polychaete worm	Albert I, Prince of Monaco	This species was described from specimens collected in the Azores by two of the prince's research yachts, the Hirondelle and the Princesse Alice.			
Prunum gregorioi Espinosa & Ortea, 2018	Sea snail	Gregorio Fuentes	A species native to Cuba, "named in honour of Gregorio Fuentes, emigrant from the Canary Islands (Charco de San Ginés, Lanzarote, 1897), who became skipper of the yacht El Pilar [sic, actually a fishing boat named Pilar], owned by the writer Ernest Hemingway, and his companion in fishing and adventures in the Gulf of Mexico and the coasts of Cuba. He died in Cojímar, Cuba, on 13 January 2002 at the age of 104." Another species was concurrently named Dentimargo elpilar after the boat.			
Prunum rosasi Espinosa & Ortea, 2018	Sea snail	Juventino Rosas	"Dedicated to the Mexican composer Juventino Rosas, on the 150th anniversary of his birth in Guanajuato, author of the famous waltz "Sobre las olas", a work inspired by the sounds of water, as its author sailed over the waves of the Gulf of Batabanó [the type locality] on his way to Mérida, Mexico."			
Pseudancistrus carnegiei Eigenmann, 1916	Fish	Andrew Carnegie	A freshwater catfish found in rivers of Colombia, whose description was published in the Annals of Carnegie Museum. Subsequently transferred to genus Dolichancistrus.			
Pseudoligosita arnoldi Girault, 1913	Wasp	Matthew Arnold				
Pseudomacromia regis-alberti Schouteden, 1934	Dragonfly	Albert I of Belgium	A species described from specimens collected in the Belgian Congo (present-day Democratic Republic of the Congo). Subsequently transferred to genus Zygonyx, and the hyphen of the specific name was eliminated, making the current accepted name Zygonyx regisalberti.			
Pseudopaludicola coracoralinae de Andrade et al., 2020	Frog	Cora Coralina	A swamp frog from Brazil, whose name "honors Anna Lins dos Guimarães Peixoto Bretas, better known by her pseudonym Cora Coralina. She was a simple woman, a Brazilian candy maker, writer and poetess. She was born and raised on the banks of the Vermelho River, in the municipality of Goiás, GO [near the type locality], and lived apart from urban centers. [...] She is considered one of the most influential Brazilian writers."			
Pseudopaludicola florencei de Andrade et al., 2018	Frog	Hércules Florence	A swamp frog from Brazil, whose name "honors [...] Hercule Florence, a French artist, painter, polygrapher, and inventor, [who] is acknowledged as the inventor of photography in Brazil in the 19th century. After his return from the Langsdorff's expedition (from 1826 to 1829), Florence developed a system able to properly describe animal sounds [...]. Such method, termed as "Zoophonie" by Florence, was the first universal method of describing animal sounds and he is therefore designated as the "father of bioacoustics" [...]. At least these two techniques (photography and zoophony = bioacoustics) are fundamental for species description nowadays [...]. Specifically, bioacoustics has proved to be efficient in clarifying the taxonomy of the genus Pseudopaludicola (as in the present study)."			
Pseudoparamys cezannei † Hartenberger, 1987	Rodent	Paul Cézanne	Subsequently transferred to genus Corbarimys.			
Pseudotanais amundseni Błażewicz, Jakiel, Bamber & Bird, 2021	Crustacean	Roald Amundsen	A deep-sea tanaid found near Antarctica; "The name of the species, whose type locality is the Amundsen Sea, is given in honour of Roald Engelbregt Gravning Amundsen, the Norwegian Polar pioneer."			
Pseudotanais chanelae Jakiel, Palero & Błażewicz, 2020	Crustacean	Coco Chanel	A deep-sea tanaid found in the Kuril–Kamchatka Trench, "dedicated to Coco Chanel, the French fashion icon, founder of the Chanel brand."			
Pseudotanais chaplini Jakiel, Palero & Błażewicz, 2019	Crustacean	Charlie Chaplin	A deep-sea tanaid found in the Clipperton fracture zone of the Pacific Ocean, "dedicated to the great actor and film director of the silent film epoch Charles "Charlie" Chaplin."			
Pseudotanais chopini Jakiel, Palero & Błażewicz, 2019	Crustacean	Frédéric Chopin	A deep-sea tanaid found in the Clipperton fracture zone of the Pacific Ocean, described by scientists of the University of Łódź, Poland, and "dedicated to Frédéric Chopin, a Polish composer and virtuoso pianist."			
Pseudotanais curieae Jakiel, Palero & Błażewicz, 2020	Crustacean	Marie Curie	A deep-sea tanaid found in the Kuril–Kamchatka Trench, described by scientists of the University of Łódź, Poland, and "dedicated to Maria Skłodowska-Curie, a Polish physicist and chemist; the first woman who was Nobel Prize Laureate in two categories."			
Pseudotanais georgesandae Jakiel, Palero & Błażewicz, 2019	Crustacean	George Sand	The sister species to P. chopini, "named in recognition of Amantine Lucile Aurore Dupin known as George Sand, a French novelist and essayist, well known for her partnership with the composer and pianist Frédéric Chopin."			
Pseudotanais kobro Jakiel, Palero & Błażewicz, 2019	Crustacean	Katarzyna Kobro	A deep-sea tanaid found in the Clipperton fracture zone of the Pacific Ocean, described by scientists of the University of Łódź, Poland.			
Pseudotanais palmeri Błażewicz, Jakiel, Bamber & Bird, 2021	Crustacean	Nathaniel Palmer	A deep-sea tanaid found near Antarctica, "The species, whose type locality is the Palmer Bay, (South Orkney Islands) was named in honour of Nathaniel Brown Palmer, the sailing captain and ship designer."			
Pseudotanais scotti Błażewicz, Jakiel, Bamber & Bird, 2021	Crustacean	Robert Falcon Scott	A deep-sea tanaid found in Southern Thule, "named in honour of Capitan Robert Falcon Scott, an officer of the British Royal Navy, the explorer of the Antarctic and leader of the Discovery Expedition."			
Pseudotanais shackletoni Błażewicz, Jakiel, Bamber & Bird, 2021	Crustacean	Ernest Shackleton	A deep-sea tanaid found in South Georgia, "named in honour of Sir Ernest Henry Shackleton, the polar explorer and leader of heroic cruise of HMS Endurance [sic]."			
Pseudotrogulus trotskyi DaSilva & Pinto-da-Rocha, 2010	Harvestman	Leon Trotsky	"In honor of Leon Trotsky (1879-1940), one of the Russian socialist revolution leaders, who definitively changed 20th century history. He was killed by order of Josef Stalin who transformed the Soviet Union into a dictatorial bureaucracy."			
Psiliglossa zeppelini Dusmet, 1917	Wasp	Ferdinand von Zeppelin	"Dedicated to Count Zeppelin, builder of the airships that have taken his name."			
Psittacula gulielmi III Schlegel, 1866	Parrot	William III of the Netherlands	"The New Guinea expedition having taken place under the auspices of His Majesty King William III, we have made it our duty to dedicate to this sovereign, who has so many titles to our gratitude, one of the most beautiful discoveries made during this important undertaking." The specific name was subsequently amended to gulielmitertii, and transferred to genus Cyclopsitta.			
Pterocheilus besseleri Dusmet, 1917	Wasp	Hans Hartwig von Beseler	"Dedicated to the German General Besseler, conqueror of Antwerp and of Nowo-Georgiewsk." This species was named during World War I, in which Beseler was an important figure. Subsequently synonymised with Onychopterocheilus hasdrubal.			
Pterocheilus joffrei Dusmet, 1917	Wasp	Joseph Joffre	"Dedicated to Marshal Joffre, commander-in-chief for two years of the French armies." This species was named during World War I, in which Joffre was an important figure.			
Pteropus livingstonii Gray, 1866	Bat	David Livingstone	A fruit bat from the Comoros, described from a specimen that had been shot by Livingstone.			
Ptiloris victoriae Gould, 1850	Bird	Queen Victoria	"I cannot possibly have a better opportunity than now presents itself of paying a just tribute of respect to our most gracious Queen, by bestowing upon this lovely denizen of the Australian forests the specific appellation of Victoriae"			
Pycnomma roosevelti Ginsburg, 1939	Fish	Franklin D. Roosevelt	A species of Caribbean goby collected during the 1938 Presidential Cruise aboard USS Houston. Subsequently transferred to genus Chriolepis.			
Quadrastichodella boudiennyi Girault, 1937	Wasp	Semyon Budyonny	"Dedicated to [a] right warrior[,] many wrong ones common recently, before and now."			
Quetzalcoatlus northropi † Lawson, 1975	Pterosaur	Jack Northrop	Quetzalcoatlus northropi is one of the largest flying creatures known to have ever existed. Its genus was named after the Aztec feathered serpent god, Quetzalcoatl; the specific epithet honors Jack Northrop, the aeronautical engineer who first experimented with flying wing aircraft designs in the 1940s. The issue of the journal Science in which the discovery was reported featured a cover depicting one of Northrop's flying wing aircraft designs, a Quetzalcoatlus, a Pteranodon, and a condor, one of the largest extant flying animals, which looked tiny in comparison.			
Ragmus liebknechti Girault, 1934	True bug	Karl Liebknecht	Subsequently transferred to genus Campylomma.			
Ragnarok wovokae † Van Valen, 1978	Arctocyonian (an extinct order of mammals)	Wovoka	A fossil mammal from the Paleocene of Wyoming. The genus Ragnarok was created concurrently and referred to "The twilight of the gods, from the Eddas, with reference to the extinction of the dinosaurs, which occurred while Ragnarok lived and in which it probably assisted." (the Alvarez hypothesis about an asteroid impact had not been formulated yet). This genus was subsequently synonymised with Baioconodon Gazin, 1941.			
Rangifer pearyi J. A. Allen, 1902	Reindeer	Robert Peary	Described from specimens collected by Peary in Ellesmere Island. Subsequently demoted to the status of subspecies of Rangifer arcticus, as Rangifer arcticus pearyi.			
Rebutia einsteinii Frič	Cactus	Albert Einstein				
Renaniana Girault, 1931	Wasp	Ernest Renan				
Rentapia Chan et al., 2016	Frog	Rentap	A genus of toads from Southeast Asia, named "to honor the legendary Iban warrior Libau Rentap, a great war chief, freedom fighter, and Malaysian national hero."			
Retepora grimaldii Jullien, 1903	Bryozoan	Albert I, Prince of Monaco	The prince was born Albert Grimaldi. This species was described from specimens collected by one of the prince's research yachts, the Hirondelle. Subsequently transferred to the genus Reteporella.			
Rhabdopleura grimaldii Jullien, 1890	Pterobranch	Albert I, Prince of Monaco	The prince was born Albert Grimaldi. This species was described from specimens collected by one of the prince's research yachts, the Hirondelle. It is currently considered a nomen dubium.			
Rhachomyces schweitzeri Balazuc	Fungus	Albert Schweitzer	A parasitic fungus found on Perigona beetles in Gabon, where Schweitzer founded his hospital.			
Rhacophorus rizali Boettger, 1897	Frog	José Rizal	"This successful writer in the fields of linguistics, history, geography and literature, who was of Tagalog descent, has also remained a respected sculptor, and who as a doctor, especially as an ophthalmologist, developed a recognised activity, collected for years in the fields of zoology and ethnography for the Dresden Museum during his political imprisonment in Mindanao. As one of the intellectual instigators of the revolution now taking place in the Philippines, he was shot by the Spaniards on 30 December 1896, and the future will be shaped by his efforts and his work!" Subsequently synonymised with Rhacophorus pardalis. This was one of the species Rizal collected.			
Rhagonycha nielsenae † Fanti & Damgaard, 2018	Beetle	Nielsine Nielsen	A fossil soldier beetle found in Baltic amber from the Eocene of Kaliningrad Oblast, "named in memory of Nielsine Mathilde Nielsen (Svendborg, 10 June 1850 - Copenhagen, 8 October 1916), the first female academic and physician in Denmark."			
Rhicnopeltella thaelmanni Girault, 1934	Wasp	Ernst Thälmann	"To a persecuted German."; Subsequently transferred to genus Ophelimus.			
Rhicnopeltomyia douglassi Girault, 1913	Wasp	Frederick Douglass	Subsequently transferred to the genus Chrysonotomyia.			
Rhicnopeltomyia washingtoni Girault, 1913	Wasp	Booker T. Washington	Subsequently transferred to the genus Neochrysocharis.			
Rhinebothrium ramosi Santos, Marques & Trevisan, 2020	Tapeworm	Graciliano Ramos	A gut parasite of the longnose stingray, described from a specimen collected from the coast of Maceió, Alagoas, Brazil, and "named in honor of Graciliano Ramos, a renowned Brazilian writer born in the State of Alagoas."			
Riselloidea tagorei † Das, Bardhan & Lahiri, 1999	Sea snail	Rabindranath Tagore	A fossil species from the Jurassic of Kutch district, India.			
Rissoella ameliae Ortea & Espinosa, 2004	Sea snail	Amelia Peláez	A species native to Cuba, named "in honour of painter Amelia Peláez (1896-1968), born in Yaguajay, Sancti Spiritus, an undisputed master of Cuban plastic arts, whose work deserves to be rediscovered as the basis of a female genre of painting that began to have international transcendence."			
Rizalthus Mendoza & Ng, 2008	Crustacean	José Rizal	A genus of gorilla crabs found in the Philippines, "named in honour of Dr. Jose P. Rizal, national hero of the Philippines, who was also an avid naturalist. The genus name is an arbitrary combination of the surname "Rizal" and "-thus", a common suffix of xanthid genera."			
Rochlingia † Guthörl, 1934	Palaeodictyoptera, an extinct order of insects	Hermann Röchling	The genus was named after German industrialist and Nazi supporter Hermann Röchling. Subsequently synonymised with Scepasma Handlirsch 1911.			
Rochlingia hitleri † Guthörl, 1934	Palaeodictyoptera, an extinct order of insects	Adolf Hitler	Subsequently synonymised with Scepasma gigas.			
Rooseveltia frankliniana O.F.Cook	Palm	Franklin D. Roosevelt	Genus and species described from specimens collected in Cocos Island during the 1938 Presidential Cruise. Subsequently synonymised with Euterpe precatoria (a species of açaí).			
Rubus × mussolinii Hruby	Flowering plant	Benito Mussolini	Hybrid blackberry from northeastern Libya.			
Saffordophyllum newcombae † Flower, 1961	Coral	Ethel Newcomb	A fossil from the Ordovician of New Mexico, USA. "I have named the species for Ethel Newcomb, concert pianist, artist, and teacher, superfluous as any such trivial memorial may seem."			
Saldula ourayi Drake & Hottes, 1949	True bug	Chief Ouray	"Named in memory of the famous Indian Chief Ouray, who was a sincere friend of the pioneers and early settlers of the Rocky Mountain region." (which this species is native to). Subsequently synonymised with Saldula dispersa.			
Saturnia isabellae Graells, 1849	Moth	Isabella II of Spain	This species, known as Spanish moon moth, was first identified in Spain during Isabella II's reign (subsequently it has also been found in France and Switzerland). The queen reportedly thanked the entomologist for the tribute, wearing a specimen of the species mounted on an emerald necklace at a reception in the Royal palace. Subsequently transferred to the monotypic genus Graellsia, named after the discoverer of this species.			
Scinax garibaldiae Lourenço, Lingnau, Haddad & Faivovich, 2019	Frog	Anita Garibaldi	This tree frog is native to Brazil.			
Scinax pixinguinha Lacerda et al., 2021	Frog	Pixinguinha	This tree frog is native to Brazil; "Alfredo da Rocha Viana Filho (1897–1973), popularly known as Pixinguinha, was a Brazilian musician and the most famous Choro player. Choro or Chorinho is a Brazilian genre of popular music originated in the 19th century. In Portuguese Choro or Chorinho means "cry" or "little cry," respectively. Ironically, Chorinho is a contagious music commonly played during joyous moments in Brazil. Brazilians usually say Pixinguinha was a kind of magician who learned how to convert tears of Choro (cry) into tears of happiness. Because 72% of the Atlantic Forest original cover has been deforested, discoveries of new species also has the power to momentarily change part of our conservationist sadness into happiness and motivation. Thus, the specific epithet of S. pixinguinha is a noun in apposition in honor of the talented Brazilian musician – Pixinguinha."; Subsequently transferred to genus Ololygon.			
Scirtes guillaumati Pic, 1918	Beetle	Adolphe Guillaumat	The description of this species was published in France amid the celebrations for the Armistice of 11 November 1918, end of the hostilities of World War I, in which Guillaumat was an important figure.			
Scirtes townshendi Pic, 1918	Beetle	Charles Townshend (British Army officer)	The description of this species was published in France amid the celebrations for the Armistice of 11 November 1918, end of the hostilities of World War I, in which Townshend was an important figure.			
Scoterpes jackdanieli Shear, 2010	Millipede	Jack Daniel	A millipede collected from Lynchburg, Tennessee, home of Daniel and his eponymous whiskey distillery, "a favorite libation of the author".			
Scrupocellaria grimaldii Jullien, 1903	Bryozoan	Albert I, Prince of Monaco	The prince was born Albert Grimaldi. This species was described from specimens collected by one of the prince's research yachts, the Hirondelle. Subsequently synonymised with Scrupocellaria inermis.			
Secodes sumneri Girault, 1913	Wasp	Charles Sumner	"Respectfully dedicated to Charles Sumner, for his addresses on war and the war systems of nations." Subsequently transferred to genus Euderus.			
Sedum carnegiei Raym.-Hamet	Flowering plant	Andrew Carnegie	A stonecrop from Tibet, described from a specimen that had been collected years prior and was growing in the Herbarium of the Carnegie Museum; "I am happy to dedicate this plant to Mr. Carnegie as proof of my sincere admiration."			
Shackletoniella Strunecky, Raabova & Bernardova 2019	Bacterium	Ernest Shackleton	"derived from the name of Sir Ernest Shackleton, a polar explorer who led British expeditions to the Antarctic including scientific investigations." This genus was applied to Phormidium antarcticum, a freshwater cyanobacterium originally described from specimens collected at Pony Lake by the Nimrod Expedition, led by Shackleton. It is also found in the Arctic.			
Shireplitis tolkieni Fernández-Triana & Ward, 2013	Wasp	J. R. R. Tolkien	Other species of Shireplitis are named after various Lord of the Rings characters.			
Simothraulopsis gracilianus Lima, 2018	Mayfly	Graciliano Ramos	"We are pleased to dedicate this species after Graciliano Ramos, a famous Brazilian modernist writer, politician and journalist that was born in the type locality." (Quebrangulo, Brazil)			
Siriella roosevelti Tattersall, 1941	Crustacean	Franklin D. Roosevelt	Described from specimens collected by the 1938 Presidential Cruise aboard USS Houston. "a new species [...] which I take pleasure in associating with the President of the United States as a mark of appreciation of his interest in marine biological research."			
Slodowskani Kittel, 2016	Wasp	Marie Curie	Replacement name for the genus Leptops Heinrich, 1968, which was preoccupied by Leptops Schoenherr, 1834. Named after the scientist's hyphenated surname, Marie Skłodowska-Curie, misspelt as "Marie Slodowska-Curie" in the paper.			
Smittia grimaldii Jullien, 1903	Bryozoan	Albert I, Prince of Monaco	The prince was born Albert Grimaldi. This species was described from specimens collected by one of the prince's research yachts, the Hirondelle. Subsequently synonymised with Porella compressa.			
Sonitha picassoi Zolotuhin & Prozorov 2010	Moth	Pablo Picasso	"The species is named in honour of the famous Spanish painter, sculptor and designer Pablo Ruiz Picasso because of the wing pattern - somewhat reminiscent of the artist's style"			
Sonoma twaini Ferro, 2016	Beetle	Mark Twain	"named for the character Mark Twain, developed by Samuel Langhorne Clemens, an author, lecturer, philosopher, humanitarian, champion of science, and humorist. Clemens lived in California for awhile, but traveled nowhere near where this species occurs—the author forgives the oversight."			
Spathomeles rizali Strohecker, 1964	Beetle	José Rizal	A species of handsome fungus beetle native to Mindanao, Philippines.			
Sperosoma grimaldii Koehler, 1897	Sea urchin	Albert I, Prince of Monaco	The prince was born Albert Grimaldi. This species was described from specimens collected by one of the prince's research yachts, the Hirondelle.			
Sphaeralcyon scotti López-González & Gili, 2005	Coral	Robert Falcon Scott	A soft coral from the Southern Ocean, "named in honour of Captain Robert F. Scott, one of the most relevant explorers in polar areas, and leader of the British National Antarctic Expedition of 1901–1904 onboard the RRS Discovery."			
Sphaeralcyon shackletoni López-González & Gili, 2005	Coral	Ernest Shackleton	A soft coral from the Southern Ocean, "named in honour of Sir Ernest H. Shackleton, one of the most remembered explorers in polar areas, and leader of the Endurance Expedition (1914–1916) among other polar explorations."			
Sphaerodactylus roosevelti Grant, 1931	Lizard	Theodore Roosevelt Jr.	This species is endemic to Puerto Rico, where Theodore Roosevelt Jr. was governor at the time of its naming.			
Sphaeropthalma chandleri Pitts, 2010	Velvet ant	Raymond Chandler	A species from the Colorado Desert, California, "Named after Raymond Thornton Chandler (1888–1959), who was an American crime writer that greatly influenced the modern private eye story and created the famous protagonist, Philip Marlowe."			
Sphiximorpha garibaldii Rondani, 1860	Fly	Giuseppe Garibaldi	A hoverfly described from a specimen found in Parma, Italy; "This species was collected at the time when the Italian volunteers, led by Giuseppe Garibaldi, were defeating the Austrian soldiers near Varese, hence decorated by me with the name of Victor."			
Spiniphiline persei Caballer & Ortea, 2015	Sea slug	Saint-John Perse	Species described from specimens collected in Guadeloupe, named "to honour the local Marie-René-Auguste-Alexis Leger, born in Pointe-à-Pitre, Guadeloupe, on 31 May 1887, winner of the Nobel Prize in Literature in 1960, whose pseudonym was Saint-John Perse."			
Spintharus manrayi Chomitz & Agnarsson, 2018	Spider	Man Ray	"The species epithet honours the artist Man Ray, a relative of the first author of the species."			
Spirodiscus grimaldii Fauvel, 1909	Polychaete worm	Albert I, Prince of Monaco	The prince was born Albert Grimaldi. This species was described from specimens collected in the Azores by two of the prince's research yachts, the Hirondelle and the Princesse Alice.			
Staphylococcus schweitzeri Tong et al., 2015	Bacterium	Albert Schweitzer	A bacterium isolated from the nares of a Red-tailed monkey from Gabon, Africa, and "named after Albert Schweitzer, founder of a hospital in Lambaréné, Gabon, and Nobel Peace Prize Laureate in 1952."			
Statira alberti Pic, 1918	Beetle	Albert I of Belgium	The description of this species was published in France amid the celebrations for the Armistice of 11 November 1918, end of the hostilities of World War I, in which Albert I was an important figure.			
Statira allenbyi Pic, 1918	Beetle	Edmund Allenby	The description of this species was published in France amid the celebrations for the Armistice of 11 November 1918, end of the hostilities of World War I, in which Allenby was an important figure.			
Statira castelnaui Pic, 1918	Beetle	Édouard de Castelnau	The description of this species was published in France amid the celebrations for the Armistice of 11 November 1918, end of the hostilities of World War I, in which Castelnau was an important figure.			
Statira diazi Pic, 1918	Beetle	Armando Diaz	The description of this species was published in France amid the celebrations for the Armistice of 11 November 1918, end of the hostilities of World War I, in which Diaz was an important figure.			
Statira fochi Pic, 1918	Beetle	Ferdinand Foch	The description of this species was published in France amid the celebrations for the Armistice of 11 November 1918, end of the hostilities of World War I, in which Foch was an important figure.			
Statira francheti Pic, 1918	Beetle	Louis Franchet d'Espèrey	The description of this species was published in France amid the celebrations for the Armistice of 11 November 1918, end of the hostilities of World War I, in which Franchet d'Espèrey was an important figure.			
Statira joffrei Pic, 1918	Beetle	Joseph Joffre	The description of this species was published in France amid the celebrations for the Armistice of 11 November 1918, end of the hostilities of World War I, in which Joffre was an important figure.			
Statira lloydi Pic, 1918	Beetle	David Lloyd George	The description of this species was published in France amid the celebrations for the Armistice of 11 November 1918, end of the hostilities of World War I, in which Lloyd George was an important figure.			
Statira pershingi Pic, 1918	Beetle	John J. Pershing	The description of this species was published in France amid the celebrations for the Armistice of 11 November 1918, end of the hostilities of World War I, in which Pershing was an important figure.			
Statira petaini Pic, 1918	Beetle	Philippe Pétain	The description of this species was published in France amid the celebrations for the Armistice of 11 November 1918, end of the hostilities of World War I, in which Pétain was an important figure.			
Statira venizelosi Pic, 1918	Beetle	Eleftherios Venizelos	The description of this species was published in France amid the celebrations for the Armistice of 11 November 1918, end of the hostilities of World War I, in which Venizelos was an important figure. "Under the name of Venizelosi I pay homage to Greece, freed from harmful influences and reconquered to its glorious past"			
Statira wilsoni Pic, 1918	Beetle	Woodrow Wilson	The description of this species was published in France amid the celebrations for the Armistice of 11 November 1918, end of the hostilities of World War I, in which Wilson was an important figure.			
Stefanikia † Čerňanskýa & Smith, 2017	Lizard	Milan Rastislav Štefánik	A genus of lizards from the Eocene of Germany, named "To recognize the contribution made by Dr. Milan Rastislav Štefánik (21 July 1880–4 May 1919), a Slovak scientist – astronomer, traveler, aviator, general and politician – one of the founders of the former Czecho-Slovakia. He tragically died in a plane crash at young age." The lead author is Slovak.			
Steganopus graui † Campbell, 1979	Bird	Miguel Grau	A fossil species of phalarope from the Pleistocene epoch, found in the Talara Tar Seeps of northwestern Peru, and "named for Admiral Miguel Grau, Peruvian patriot and hero of the War of the Pacific with Chile."			
Stenomorpha roosevelti Smith, Miller & Wheeler, 2011	Beetle	Theodore Roosevelt	"This species is named in honor of the 26th President of the United States, Theodore Roosevelt, for his contributions to conservation."			
Stenotarsus kafkai Arriaga-Varela et al., 2013	Beetle	Franz Kafka	"Dedicated to the eminent Czech author Franz Kafka, who imagined what it would be like to wake up as an insect."			
Stentorceps abbotti Nielsen & Buffington, 2011	Wasp	Edwin Abbott Abbott	"Named in honour of E.A. Abbott, the author of Flatland: A Romance of Many Dimensions (Abbott 1884). This story is about a two-dimensional world populated by geometric figures, with circles as rulers. The distinctive flat, circular dorsal terminus of the corniculum of S. abbotti resembles one of the leaders of Flatland."			
Steriphopus woolfi Benjamin, 2024	Spider	Leonard Woolf	A palp-footed spider endemic to Sri Lanka, named "after Leonard Sidney Woolf (25 November 1880 – 14 August 1969) the author of The Village in the Jungle (1913). The novel was based on his experiences as a civil servant in Sri Lanka."			
Stethynium maxwelli Girault, 1915	Wasp	James Clerk Maxwell	Subsequently transferred to genus Parastethynium.			
Stethynium mayeri Girault, 1912	Wasp	Julius von Mayer	"Respectfully dedicated to [Julius] Robert Mayer, who with Hermann Helmholtz discovered the law of the conservation of energy." Subsequently transferred to the genus Allanagrus.			
Stictane berliosi Spitsyn & Bolotov, 2020	Moth	Hector Berlioz				
Stigonema tagorum Sudipta K.Das, Keshari & Adhikary	Cyanobacterium	Rabindranath Tagore	This species was described from samples collected in Shantiniketan, close to Visva-Bharati University, and "named after the Nobel laureate and founder of the University, Rabindranath Tagore."			
Strelitzia nicolai Regel & Körn.	Flowering plant	Grand Duke Nicholas Nikolaevich of Russia the Elder	"As one of the few plants which, with its tall palm-like growth and splendid large leaves, also combines large, beautiful flowers that continuously develop in rich abundance for two months from the large sheaths, we deemed this plant worthy to bear the name of His Imperial Highness, Grand Duke Nikolai Nikolaevich, the high Protector of the Russian Botanical Garden in St. Petersburg, to whom we dedicate it herewith in deepest reverence."			
Streptelasma tennysoni † Pestana, 1960	Coral	Alfred, Lord Tennyson	A fossil species of horn coral from the Ordovician of California, US.			
Streptomyces cavourensis Skarbek & Brady, 1978	Bacterium	Camillo Benso, Count of Cavour	This antibiotic-producing bacterium was first isolated in Italy.			
Struthiolarella shackletoni † Zinsmeister & Camacho, 1980	Sea snail	Ernest Shackleton	A fossil species from the Eocene of Seymour Island, Antarctica.			
Sundacossus gauguini Yakovlev, 2008	Moth	Paul Gauguin	"named in honor of the great French artist Paul Gauguin who praised Polynesian nature." (Though this species is from the island of Sumba in the Malay Archipelago, not Polynesia).			
Sympiesonecremnus boasi Girault, 1913	Wasp	Franz Boas	"Dedicated to Franz Boas for his book The Mind of Primitive Man". Subsequently transferred to the genus Sympiesis.			
Sympiesomorphelleus suttneri Girault, 1913	Wasp	Bertha von Suttner	"Respectfully dedicated to Bertha von Suttner for her Die Waffen nieder!." Subsequently transferred to the genus Elachertus.			
Sympiesomorphelleus thoreauini Girault, 1915	Wasp	Henry David Thoreau	Subsequently transferred to the genus Elachertus.			
Syndesmya grimaldii Dautzenberg & H. Fischer, 1906	Bivalve	Albert I, Prince of Monaco	The prince was born Albert Grimaldi. This species was described from specimens collected by one of the prince's research yachts, the Princesse Alice. Subsequently transferred to genus Abra.			
Syntomosphyrum gregi Girault, 1913	Wasp	William Rathbone Greg	Subsequently transferred to the genus Aprostocetus.			
Tagoria Yakovlev & Zolotuhin, 2021	Moth	Rabindranath Tagore	A genus of moths native to India and Nepal, "named after the Nobel laureate, Rabindranath Tagore (1861−1941), who was a Bengali polymath–poet, writer, playwright, composer, philosopher, social reformer and painter." This genus was subsequently found to be a homonym of the jumping spider genus Tagoria Schenkel, 1963 (named for its affinity to Agorius), which was not in use anyway because it had been synonymised with Synagelides; nevertheless, a replacement was needed, and the nomen novum is Tagoriana Rivaz Hernández & Deshmukh, 2022.			
Tamilokus mabinia Shipway & Distel, 2019	Bivalve	Apolinario Mabini	A species of shipworm named "in honour of Apolinario Mabini, a Philippine national hero, and pertaining to the type location of the specimens from Mabini, Batangas, Philippines."			
Tanais grimaldii Dollfus, 1897	Crustacean	Albert I, Prince of Monaco	The prince was born Albert Grimaldi. This species was described from specimens collected by one of the prince's research yachts, the Hirondelle.			
Tennysoniana Girault, 1920	Wasp	Alfred, Lord Tennyson	Subsequently synonymised with Thoreauia (also in this list).			
Teresirogas prestonae Quicke & van Achterberg, 2014	Wasp	Margaret Preston	An Australian brightly colored parasitoid wasp "Named after the influential Australian modernist artist, Margaret Preston (1875–1973), well known for her highly colourful paintings."			
Tessmannella kiplingi Buffington & van Noort, 2012	Wasp	Rudyard Kipling	A species native to the Republic of the Congo, "Named in honor of Rudyard Kipling, author of Just So Stories and others about Africa."			
Tetrastichus cobdeni Girault, 1913	Wasp	Richard Cobden	Subsequently transferred to the genus Aprostocetus.			
Tetrastichus poincarei Girault, 1913	Wasp	Henri Poincaré				
Thericium ataturki † Landau, Harzhauser, İslamoğlu & Marques da Silva 2013	Sea snail	Mustafa Kemal Atatürk	A fossil species from the Miocene of Southern Turkey.			
Thoreauea J.K. Williams	Flowering plant	Henry David Thoreau	A genus of plants of the dogbane family, native to Mexico. "It is an honor to name this new genus after Henry David Thoreau (1817–1862), noted essayist and naturalist [...] His loving, and often unrecognized, commitment to botany inspired me to undertake the subject."			
Thoreauella Girault, 1930	Wasp	Henry David Thoreau				
Thoreauia Girault, 1916	Wasp	Henry David Thoreau				
Thorichthys panchovillai Del Moral-Flores, López-Segovia & Hernández-Arellano, 2017	Fish	Pancho Villa	A freshwater cichlid fish native to the Coatzacoalcos River basin, Mexico.			
Thouarella amundseni Núñez-Flores, Gomez-Uchida & López-González, 2021	Coral	Roald Amundsen	A soft coral from the coast of Antarctica.			
Tolkienia † Lieberman & Kloc, 1997	Trilobite	J. R. R. Tolkien	A genus of Devonian trilobites that has been found in Spain, France and the United States.			
Trachinocephalus gauguini Polanco, Acero & Betancur, 2016	Fish	Paul Gauguin	This species of lizardfish is endemic to the Marquesas Islands, where Gauguin lived for the last two years of his life and was buried.			
Tragelaphus scriptus meneliki Neumann, 1902	Antelope	Menelik II	Known as Menelik's bushbuck, this subspecies is endemic to Ethiopia.			
Trichaporoidella maupaussanti Girault, 1915	Wasp	Guy de Maupassant	Subsequently transferred to genus Neotrichoporoides.			
Trigoniophthalmus lermontovi Kaplin, 2015	Bristletail	Mikhail Lermontov	"Since the species was collected near the place of the duel of M. Yu. Lermontov, it was named in honor of this great Russian poet and writer in connection with his 200th birthday anniversary. "			
Trilacuna clarissa Eichenberger, 2011	Spider	Agatha Christie	"The species epithet refers to the name of Agatha Christie, born as Agatha Mary Clarissa Miller, who was a brilliant and famous English author of novels, short stories and plays."			
Trilobodrilus ellenscrippsae Kerbl et al., 2018	Polychaete worm	Ellen Browning Scripps	This species was described from specimens collected at La Jolla Cove, California, USA, and "named [...] to honour Ellen Browning Scripps (1836–1932), a founding benefactor of the Scripps Institution of Oceanography [...] in La Jolla, California. No species have been named for her to date, yet Ellen Browning Scripps' impact on science has been very important"			
Trimerocephalus chopini † Kin & Błażejowski, 2013	Trilobite	Frédéric Chopin	A species from the Devonian of Poland, named "In honour of Fryderyk Franciszek Chopin, the most famous Polish composer during the Romantic period of classical music, also called the 'poet of the piano'."			
Triplocania einsteini González-Obando, Carrejo-Gironza & García Aldrete, 2021	Barklouse	Albert Einstein	"This species is dedicated to Albert Einstein, theoretical physicist, Nobel Prize in Physics in 1921, author of the Theory of Relativity."			
Tritropis grimaldii Chevreux, 1891	Crustacean	Albert I, Prince of Monaco	The prince was born Albert Grimaldi. This species was described from specimens collected by one of the prince's research yachts, the Hirondelle. Subsequently transferred to genus Rhachotropis.			
Trochilus herrani Delattre & Bourcier, 1846	Hummingbird	Pedro Alcántara Herrán	Known as rainbow-bearded thornbill, this hummingbird native to Colombia, Ecuador and northern Peru was "Dedicated to General Herrán, former president of the Republic of New Granada; a man of rare dedication and a friend of Europeans who can spread useful knowledge and the development of natural sciences in his country." Subsequently transferred to genus Chalcostigma.			
Trogolaphysa mariecurieae Ferreira, Oliveira & Zeppelini, 2022	Springtail	Marie Curie	"Species named after Dr. Marie Skłodowska-Curie for her enormous contribution to science."			
Troides alexandrae Rothschild, 1907	Butterfly	Alexandra of Denmark	Recorded as the largest butterfly in the world, Queen Alexandra's birdwing is restricted to the forests of Oro Province in eastern Papua New Guinea. "On account of the relationship of this new species with Troides victoriae [protonym Papilio (Ornithoptera) victoriae, also in this list], we think the name alexandrae to be very appropriate." Subsequently transferred to the genus Ornithoptera.			
Trophon shackletoni Hedley, 1911	Sea snail	Ernest Shackleton	A species native to the Southern Ocean, described from specimens collected at Cape Royds by the Nimrod Expedition, led by Shackleton. "As the handsomest novelty in the collection, it is dedicated to the intrepid leader of the Expedition."; Subsequently transferred to the genus Trophonella.			
Tropidophis cacuangoae Ortega-Andrade et al., 2022	Snake	Dolores Cacuango	A wood snake native to Ecuador, named "honoring Dolores Cacuango, an Ecuadorian benchmark of feminism and human rights of the early twentieth century. She claimed the identity and rights of the Ecuadorian indigenous people, leading them to defend themselves from abuse and discrimination. Also, she demanded the teaching of Quechua and founded the first bilingual schools in Ecuador and the Ecuadorian Indigenous Federation."			
Trypanosoma livingstonei Teixeira & Camargo, 2013	Protist	Mary Moffat Livingstone	"The name was given because Trypanosoma livingstonei n. sp. was first discovered in bats captured in Chupanga, Mozambique, a small village in the margin of the Zambezi River, where Mary Livingstone, the wife of David Livingstone, died of "fevers" in 1862; her grave remains in a small cemetery from a Portuguese Mission practically destroyed by the Mozambique wars."			
Tschaidicancha chaplini Benedetti & Pinto-da-Rocha, 2022	Harvestman	Charlie Chaplin	"dedicated to the English actor, composer, director and producer Sir Charles Spencer Chaplin (1889–1977), a worldwide icon in the era of silent film through his screen persona "The Tramp"."			
Tylenchorhynchus quaidi Golden, Maqbool & Handoo, 1987	Roundworm	Muhammad Ali Jinnah	A plant parasitic nematode from Pakistan; "The species name is given in honor of the founder of Pakistan, Quaidi-Azam Mohammad Ali Jinnah."			
Typhloponemys schweitzeri Pace, 2009	Beetle	Albert Schweitzer	A rove beetle from Gabon, "dedicated to the memory of Dr. Albert Schweitzer, a famous German physician, musicologist and theologian, Nobel Peace Prize winner, 1952. In Gabon he founded the famous leprosarium of Lambaréné."			
Ummidia colemanae Godwin & Bond, 2021	Spider	Bessie Coleman	A trapdoor spider from Texas, named "in honor of Texas native Bessie Coleman (1892–1926), the first African American and Native American woman to obtain her pilot's license."			
Ummidia macarthuri Godwin & Bond, 2021	Spider	Douglas MacArthur	A trapdoor spider from Arkansas, "named in honor of Arkansas native General Douglas MacArthur."			
Uriolelaps poei Girault, 1915	Wasp	Edgar Allan Poe	Genus Uriolelaps was subsequently synonymised with Dipara.			
Urothoe grimaldii Chevreux, 1895	Crustacean	Albert I, Prince of Monaco	The prince was born Albert Grimaldi. This species was described from specimens collected by one of the prince's research yachts, the Princesse Alice.			
Vampirococcus lugosii Moreira et al., 2021	Bacterium	Bela Lugosi	"after Bela Lugosi (1882–1956), who played the role of the vampire in the iconic 1931 film Dracula. [It is an] epibiotic bacterium that preys on anoxygenic photosynthetic gammaproteobacterial species of the genus Halochromatium."			
Vetelia gandhii † Esteban & Nasif, 1996	Armadillo	Mahatma Gandhi	A fossil species of dasypodidae from the Miocene of Catamarca Province, Argentina.			
Victoria Lindl.	Flowering plant	Queen Victoria				
Volvarina hemingwayi Espinosa & Ortea, 2015	Sea snail	Ernest Hemingway	A species native to Cuba, "named in honour of the American writer Ernest Hemingway, Nobel laureate in Literature, a great friend of Cuba, its people and its sea, where his surname is synonymous with all that is great and with the spirit of adventure."			
Wendyichthys lautreci † Lund & Poplin, 1997	Fish	Henri de Toulouse-Lautrec	A fossil species from the Carboniferous of Montana, US.			
Whittieria Girault, 1938	Wasp	John Greenleaf Whittier				
Xymmer phungi Satria et al., 2016	Ant	Phan Đình Phùng	"named after a Vietnamese revolutionary leader, Mr. Phan Dinh Phung, who was born in 1847 in Ha Tinh Province [where the type locality is] and led rebel armies against French colonial forces."			
Zamenhofella Girault, 1941	Wasp	L. L. Zamenhof	Subsequently synonymised with the genus Austroencyrtus Girault, 1923.			
Zercon shevtchenkoi Faleńczyk-Koziróg, Shevchyk, Pylypenko & Kaczmarek, 2018	Mite	Taras Shevchenko	"The new species is dedicated to the Ukrainian poet Taras Hryhorowycz Shevchenko (1814-1861) whose grave is located in Kaniev." (Close to the type locality).			
Zonophryxus grimaldii Koehler, 1911	Crustacean	Albert I, Prince of Monaco	The prince was born Albert Grimaldi. This parasitic isopod, which affects the shrimp Heterocarpus grimaldii (also in this list), was described from specimens collected by one of the prince's research yachts, the Princesse-Alice.			
Zonothrips smutsi Faure, 1957	Thrips	Jan Smuts	This species is native to South Africa. Subsequently transferred to genus Hydatothrips.			
Zovax vangoghi Błeszyński, 1965	Moth	Vincent van Gogh				

== See also ==
- List of bacterial genera named after personal names
- List of rose cultivars named after people
- List of taxa named by anagrams
- List of organisms named after the Harry Potter series
