= Philippe Cuénoud =

Swiss entomologist and botanist

Philippe cuénoud
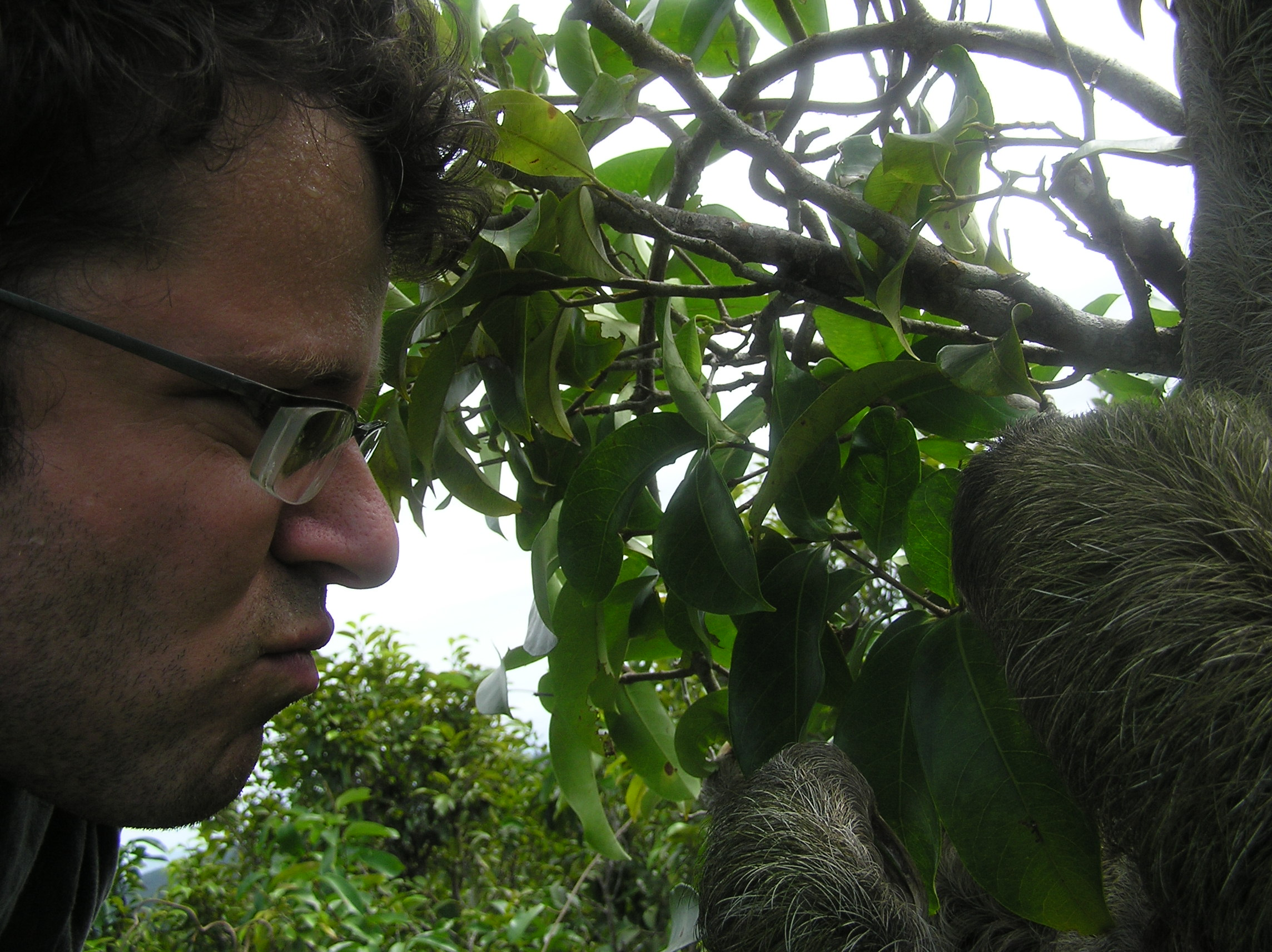
- Philippe Cuénoud with a three-toed sloth in Panama, 2006.
- Born: 8 July 1968 (age 58); Geneva, Switzerland
- Education: University of Geneva
- Scientific career
- Fields: Entomology and Botany
- Thesis: Phylogénie moléculaire, taxonomie et biogéographie du genre Ilex L. (Aquifoliaceae) (1998)
- Doctoral advisor: Rodolphe Spichiger

Philippe Cuénoud (born July 8, 1968) is an entomologist and botanist of Swiss and Ukrainian descent, living in Onex (near Geneva), who worked on the Psocoptera of Switzerland and Papua New Guinea, as well as on plant phylogeny. He found in 1991 the only then known population of Lachesilla rossica near Geneva (the species has been described from southern Russia and may still exist there - it was found in Albania in 2015) and contributed further to the knowledge of the flora and fauna of the canton of Geneva with the first mention of a slender-billed gull (a Mediterranean bird species usually absent form Switzerland) and with the discovery of the first reported population of small-leaved helleborines. He also participated in a multidisciplinary study of the free-living fauna and flora of Basel's Zoo. In a 1999 trip to Brasil with Alain Chautems, he was among the first few people to see the newly rediscovered flower Sinningia araneosa, that had gone missing for more than a century.

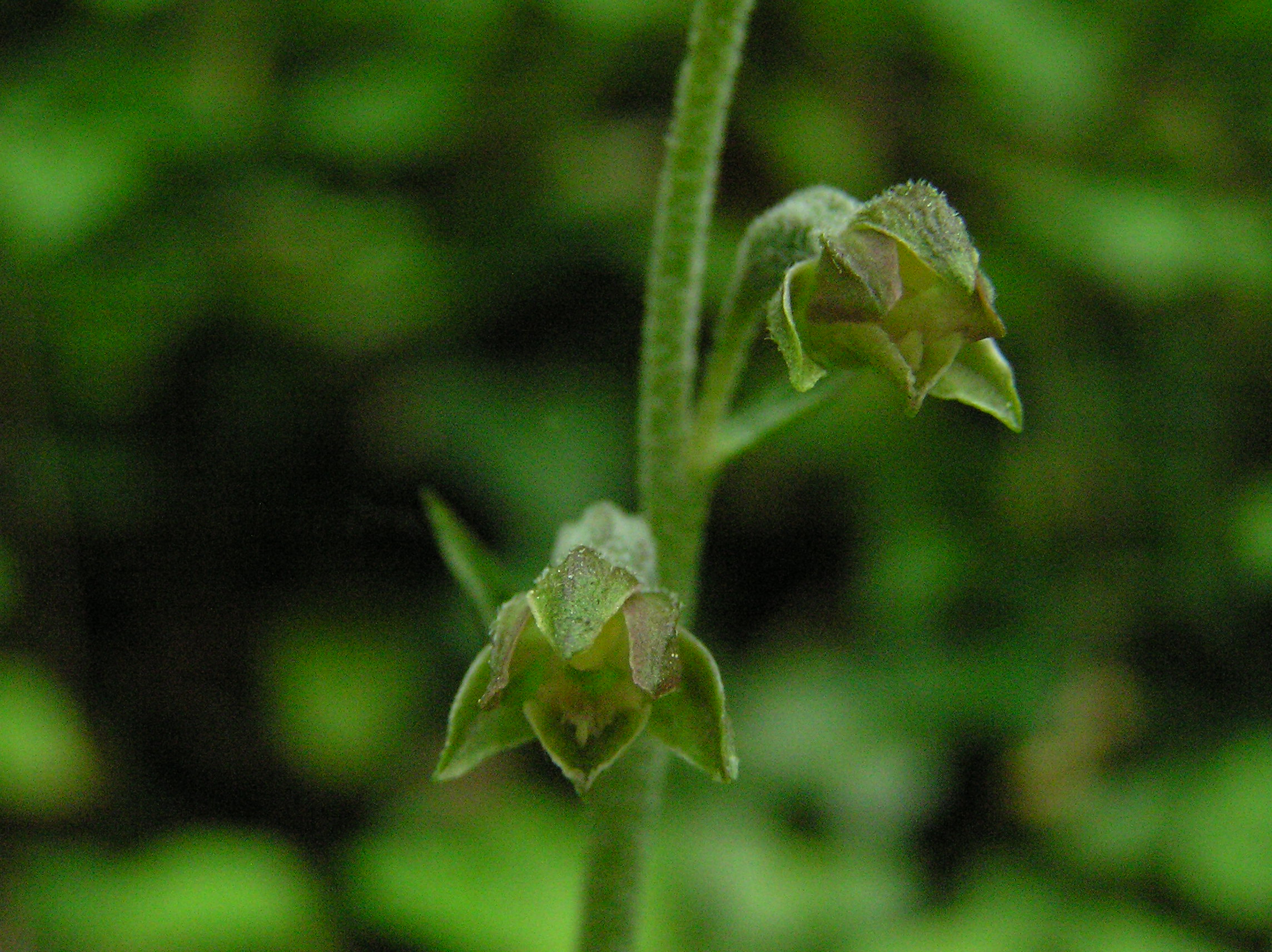
Small-leaved helleborine from the firstly discovered population of this species in the canton of Geneva, 2004.

In 2022, he joined Onex's City Council to help better protect a population of autumn lady's-tresses.

== Entomology ==
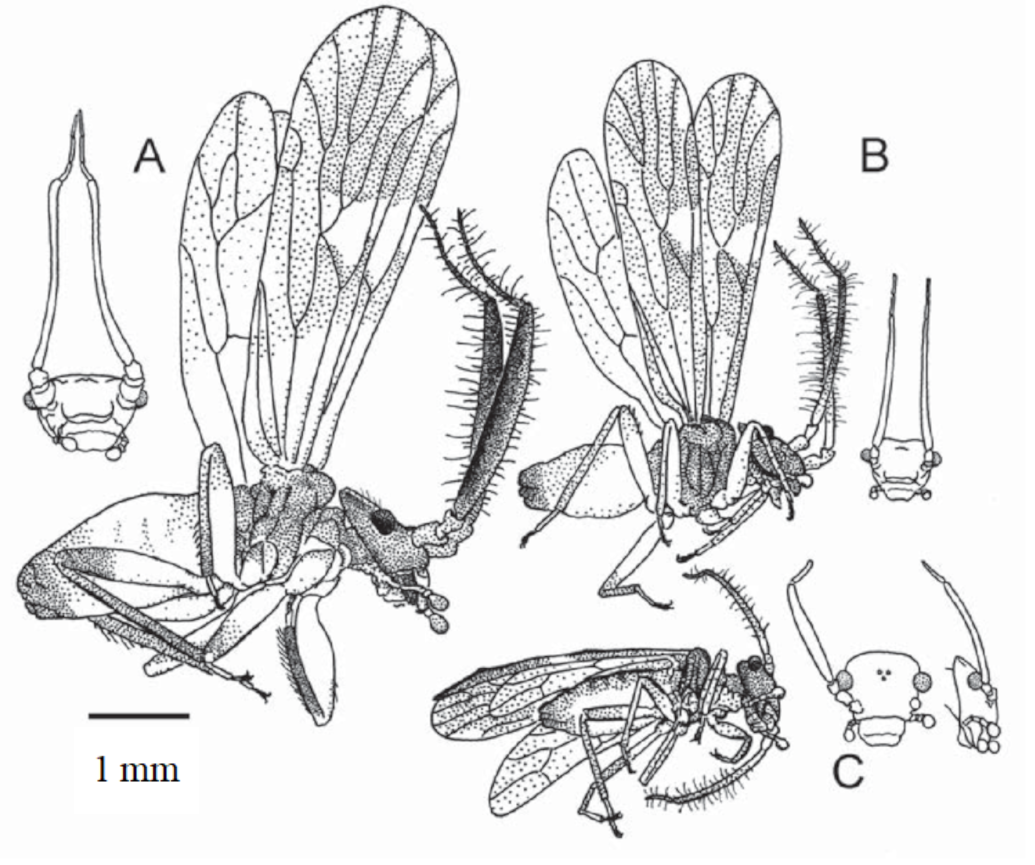
The three species of Novopsocus. A. N. magnus, B. N. stenopterus, C. N. caeciliae (from Cuénoud, 2008).

Cuénoud collected Psocoptera (an insect order related to lice) for the best part of the year 1993 in Papua New Guinea, on the traditional grounds of the Biangai and Biaru people, in the Morobe province, as well as in the Baitabag forest, in the Madang province, and took part in a survey of the bird species of the Kuper mountain range. The rich material obtained allowed him to revise the New Guinean endemic genus Novopsocus (Pseudocaeciliidae) and to describe the two new species Novopsocus magnus and Novopsocus caeciliae, by comparison with specimens of the Australian Museum lent by Courtenay Smithers (previous authors had mistaken males of N. magnus for males of the type species Novopsocus stenopterus, whilst N. caeciliae had never been found before).

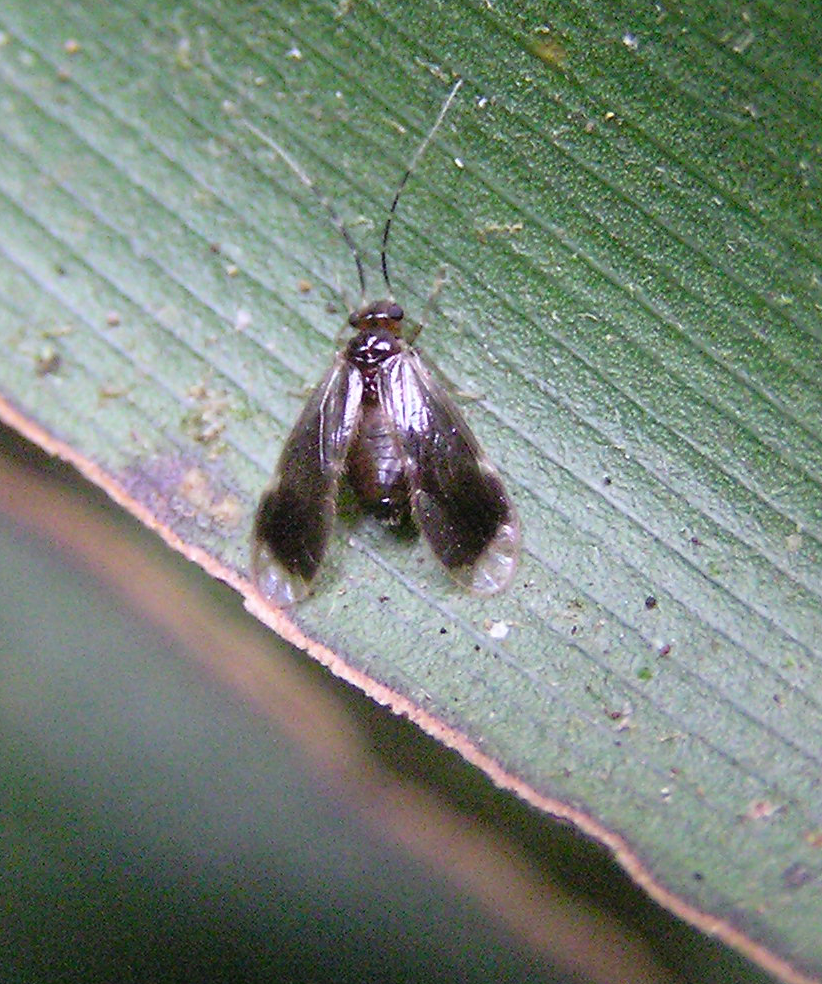
Polypsocus sp. (Psocoptera: Amphipsocidae) in a cloud forest of Panama.

Cuénoud also had a small part in the Ibisca project ("Investigating the Biodiversity of Soil and Canopy Arthropods"), an ambitious scientific programme led by Bruno Corbara, Maurice Leponce, Hector Barrios and Yves Basset (with the initial support of Edward O. Wilson), that produced new data on the biodiversity of the San Lorenzo rainforest, on the Caribbean coast of the Panama isthmus (in a paper written by the Ibisca team and featured on the cover of the prestigious scientific journal Science, the total count of arthropod species of the forest was extrapolated to be about 25'000). Cuénoud is possibly the only person this far (as of 2019) to have seen (and photographed) a live specimen of the rare insect species Oronoqua ibisca (Issidae), discovered during the field-sampling phase of the project and known otherwise from mounted specimens.

== Botany ==
Betanin, a pigment found in some plants of the order Caryophyllales.

Cuénoud studied the phylogeny of the genus Ilex (hollies and related species, Aquifoliaceae) with Jean-François Manen, Pierre-André Loizeau and Rodolphe Spichiger (in the same laboratory as Philippe Clerc and Vincent Savolainen), a study that led to the synonymy of the North American genus Nemopanthus with Ilex. He also studied the plant order Caryophyllales (made up of about 30 plant families, many of which are adapted to dry habitats - e.g. cacti - or carnivory: sundews and nepenthes, among others) with Vincent Savolainen and Mark Chase in Kew Gardens, sequencing the matK gene for many of its genera, and analysing the pigments of some of them (some Caryophyllales are known to produce betalains, an almost unique occurrence among Angiosperms). These results confirmed that Molluginaceae and Phytolaccaceae in their traditional sense are paraphyletic, and contributed to the recognition of the families Barbeuiaceae (containing a single liana species in its own genus, living on the island of Madagascar), Gisekiaceae (made up of the monotypic, African genus Gisekia), Limeaceae (comprising two genera of herbaceous plants from Africa, India and Australia) and Lophiocarpaceae (containing Lophiocarpus and Corbichonia, two genera of herbs from Africa and India).
