= Novopsocus caeciliae =

Scientific classification
- Domain: Eukaryota
- Kingdom: Animalia
- Phylum: Arthropoda
- Class: Insecta
- Order: Psocodea
- Family: Pseudocaeciliidae
- Genus: Novopsocus
- Species: N. caeciliae

Binomial name
- Novopsocus caeciliae Cuénoud

Species of booklouse

Novopsocus caeciliae is a species of Novopsocus from New Guinea known from a single male thus far, found in the lowlands near Baitabag, Madang Province. Its hypandrium is similar to that of Novopsocus magnus, and thus differs from the hypandrium of Novopsocus stenopterus. It is the smallest of all three Novopsocus species (~2.5 mm long).
