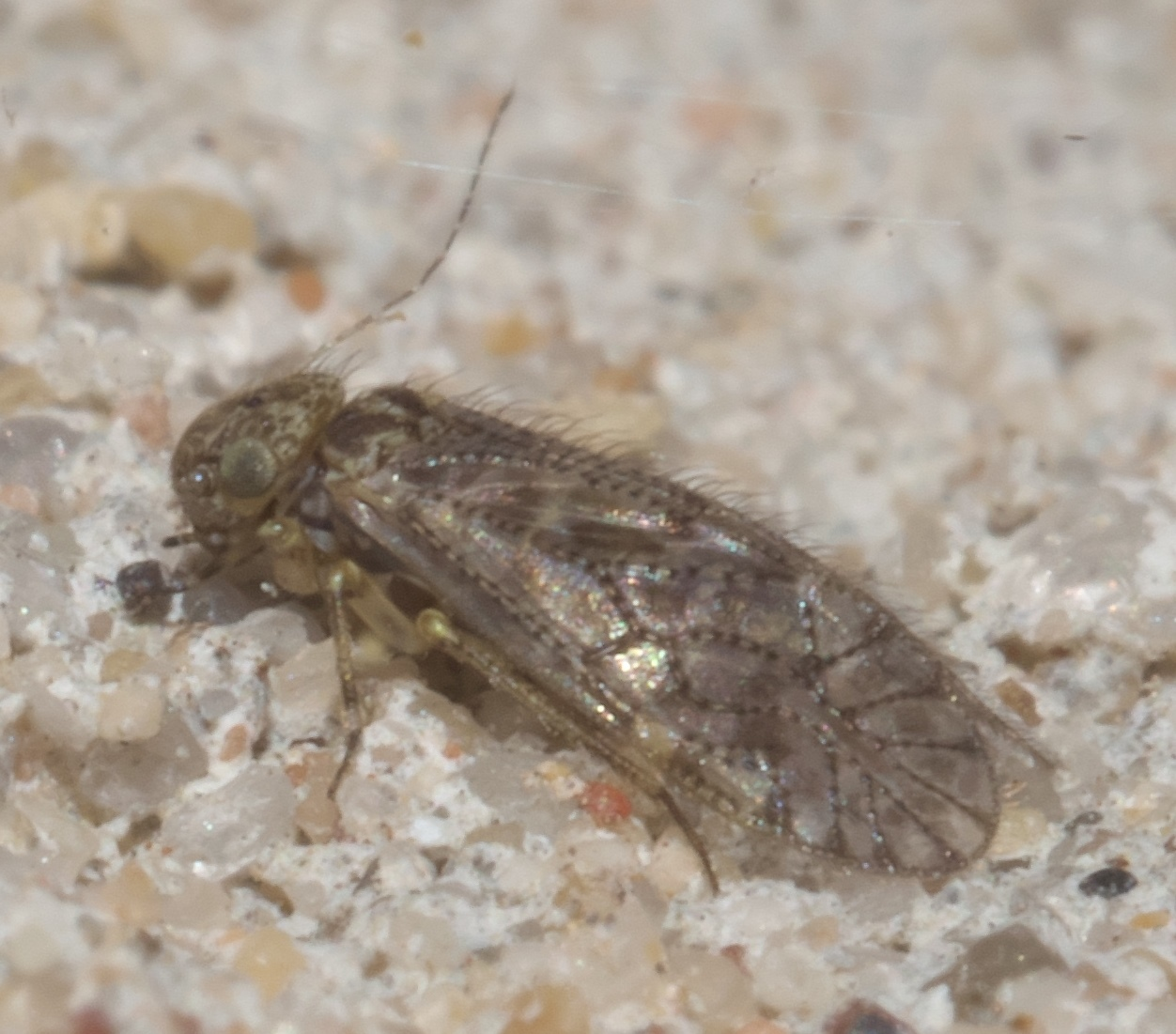
- Aaroniella badonneli, Oklahoma

Scientific classification
- Domain: Eukaryota
- Kingdom: Animalia
- Phylum: Arthropoda
- Class: Insecta
- Order: Psocodea
- Family: Philotarsidae
- Genus: Aaroniella
- Species: A. badonneli

Binomial name
- Aaroniella badonneli (Danks, 1950)

Synonyms
- Philotarsus badonneli Danks, 1950

= Aaroniella badonneli =

Species of booklouse

Aaroniella badonneli is a species of loving barklouse in the family Philotarsidae. It is found in Europe (Italy, Russia and France), Northern Asia (excluding China), as well as Canada and the United States.

== Description ==
The species are 2.7 millimetres (0.11 in) long for females and 2.4 millimetres (0.094 in) for males. Females deliver as many as 38 eggs.

== Name ==
The species is named after André Badonnel, a French entomologist active in the 20th century.
