= Abelopsocus truganiniae =

Scientific classification
- Kingdom: Animalia
- Phylum: Arthropoda
- Class: Insecta
- Order: Psocodea
- Family: Philotarsidae
- Genus: Abelopsocus
- Species: A. truganiniae

Binomial name
- Abelopsocus truganiniae Schmidt & New, 2008

Species of insects

Abelopsocus truganiniae is a species of barklice native to Tasmania in Australia. It was described in 2008.

It is named after Truganini, the last surviving "full-blooded" Aboriginal Tasmanian.
