= Philotarsus kwakiutl =

Scientific classification
- Domain: Eukaryota
- Kingdom: Animalia
- Phylum: Arthropoda
- Class: Insecta
- Order: Psocodea
- Family: Philotarsidae
- Genus: Philotarsus
- Species: P. kwakiutl

Binomial name
- Philotarsus kwakiutl Mockford, 1951

Species of booklouse

Philotarsus kwakiutl is a species of loving barklouse in the family Philotarsidae. It is found in North America.
