= Pseudocaecilius citricola =

Scientific classification
- Domain: Eukaryota
- Kingdom: Animalia
- Phylum: Arthropoda
- Class: Insecta
- Order: Psocodea
- Family: Pseudocaeciliidae
- Genus: Pseudocaecilius
- Species: P. citricola

Binomial name
- Pseudocaecilius citricola (Ashmead, 1879)

Species of booklouse

Pseudocaecilius citricola is a species of false lizard barklouse in the family Pseudocaeciliidae. It is found in Africa, the Caribbean, Central America, North America, Oceania, South America, and Southern Asia.
