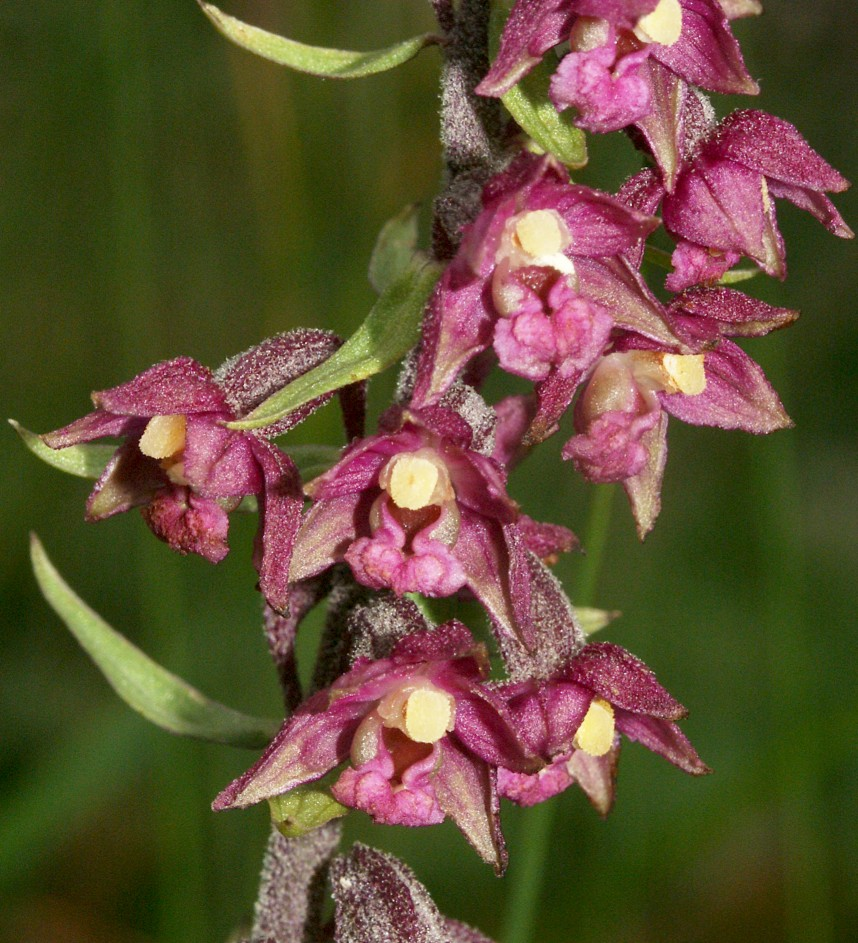

Scientific classification
- Kingdom: Plantae
- Clade: Tracheophytes
- Clade: Angiosperms
- Clade: Monocots
- Order: Asparagales
- Family: Orchidaceae
- Subfamily: Epidendroideae
- Genus: Epipactis
- Species: E. atrorubens

Binomial name
- Epipactis atrorubens (Hoffm.) Besser

Synonyms
- Synonyms list: Serapias latifolia atrorubens Hoffm.; Serapias atrorubens (Hoffm.) Bernh.; Epipactis latifolia var. atrorubens (Hoffm.) Wallr.; Helleborine atrorubens (Hoffm.) Druce; Epipactis atropurpurea Raf.; Epipactis media Fr.; Epipactis macropodia Peterm.; Epipactis viridans (Crantz) Beck; Limodorum rubiginosum (Crantz) Kuntze; Helleborine media (Fr.) Druce; Amesia atropurpurea (Raf.) A.Nelson & J.F.Macbr.; Helleborine rubiginosa (Crantz) Samp.; Helleborine viridans (Crantz) Samp.; Amesia rubiginosa (Crantz) Mousley; Epipactis cruenta Bertero ex Vignolo; Epipactis subclausa Robatsch; Epipactis thessala B.Baumann & H.Baumann; Epipactis danubialis Robatsch & Rydlo; Epipactis spiridonovii Devillers-Tersch. & Devillers

= Epipactis atrorubens =

Species of orchid

Epipactis atrorubens, the dark-red helleborine or royal helleborine, is an herbaceous plant in the orchid family, Orchidaceae.

As with many other species of orchids, the species is legally protected in some countries. Plantlife designated the dark-red helleborine as the county flower for Banffshire, Scotland.

== Description ==
The plant is hardy and has a short rootstalk, often with multiple, fleshy roots. It blooms from June to August with erect, mostly purple inflorescences with dense hair on the tops, standing between 20–80 cm (7.9–31.5 in) in height. The blossoms emit a strong vanilla scent, especially in warm weather. The flowers sometimes vary in color, but are in general reddish-brown. The fruit is a capsule, out of which the light, dustlike seeds are spread by the wind. A number of natural hybrids with other Epipactis species are known.

== Taxonomy ==
Epipactis atrorubens (Hoffm.) Besser is an accepted species, though Epipactis atrorubens Rostk. ex Spreng. nom. illeg. is a synonym of Epipactis microphylla.

== Distribution and habitat ==
The dark-red helleborine is widespread across Europe, and is found in the north to the subarctic, in the south to the Mediterranean, and in the east to Western Siberia and the Caucasus. (Codes) The orchid grows at altitudes from sea level to 2,400 m (7,900 ft), and so can be found in mountainous regions such as the southern Alps. In Central Europe it has been in decline in recent decades. It is not, however, one of the most severely threatened species of orchid. The species is also reportedly naturalized in one location in the US State of Vermont.

The dark-red helleborine favours warm and dry locations, with soil basic to neutral in pH, nutrient-poor, and permeable. It grows in loose rock, scree, or sandy soils above a limestone substrate, including dunes, lawns, or open forest. It is also a pioneer species, which settles in fallow areas, road embankments, and waste dumps, in the early to middle stages of ecological succession, among communities of grass and bush and light birch stands.

== Ecology ==
Epipactis atrorubens relies upon mycorrhizal associations with several fungi species in the order Pezizales. Pezizales are some of the least abundant fungal species in the forests where this orchid species grows.

The flowers of this orchid species are often pollinated by insects, particularly bees.

== Conservation ==
This species is assessed as conservation status "least concern" in Europe and in the United Kingdom, however, its distribution in some countries is scarce and it has been noted to be threatened in some areas by overgrazing and quarrying.

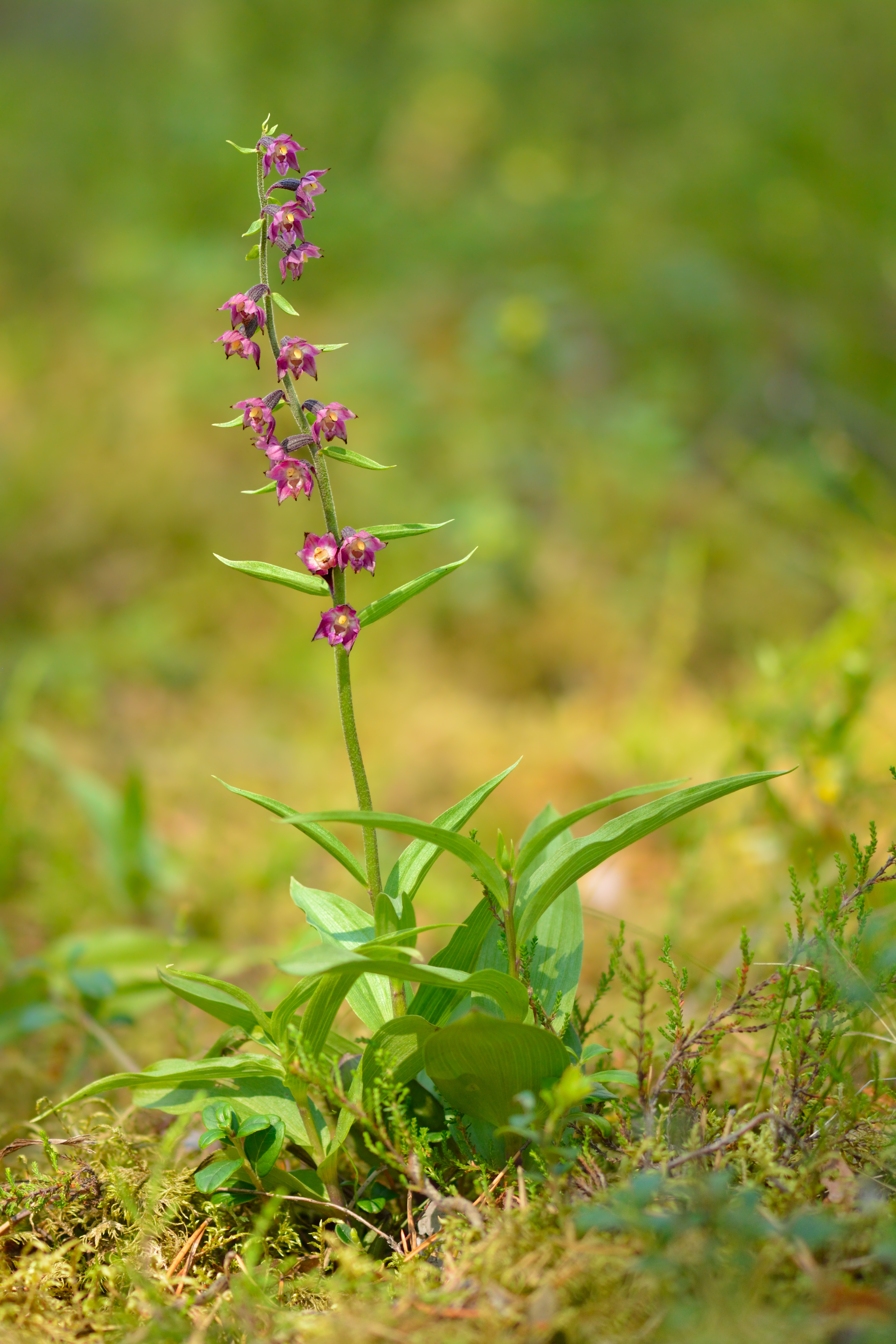
Plant

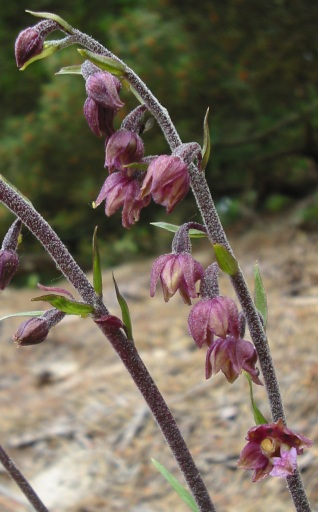
Inflorescence
Variation in flower colour
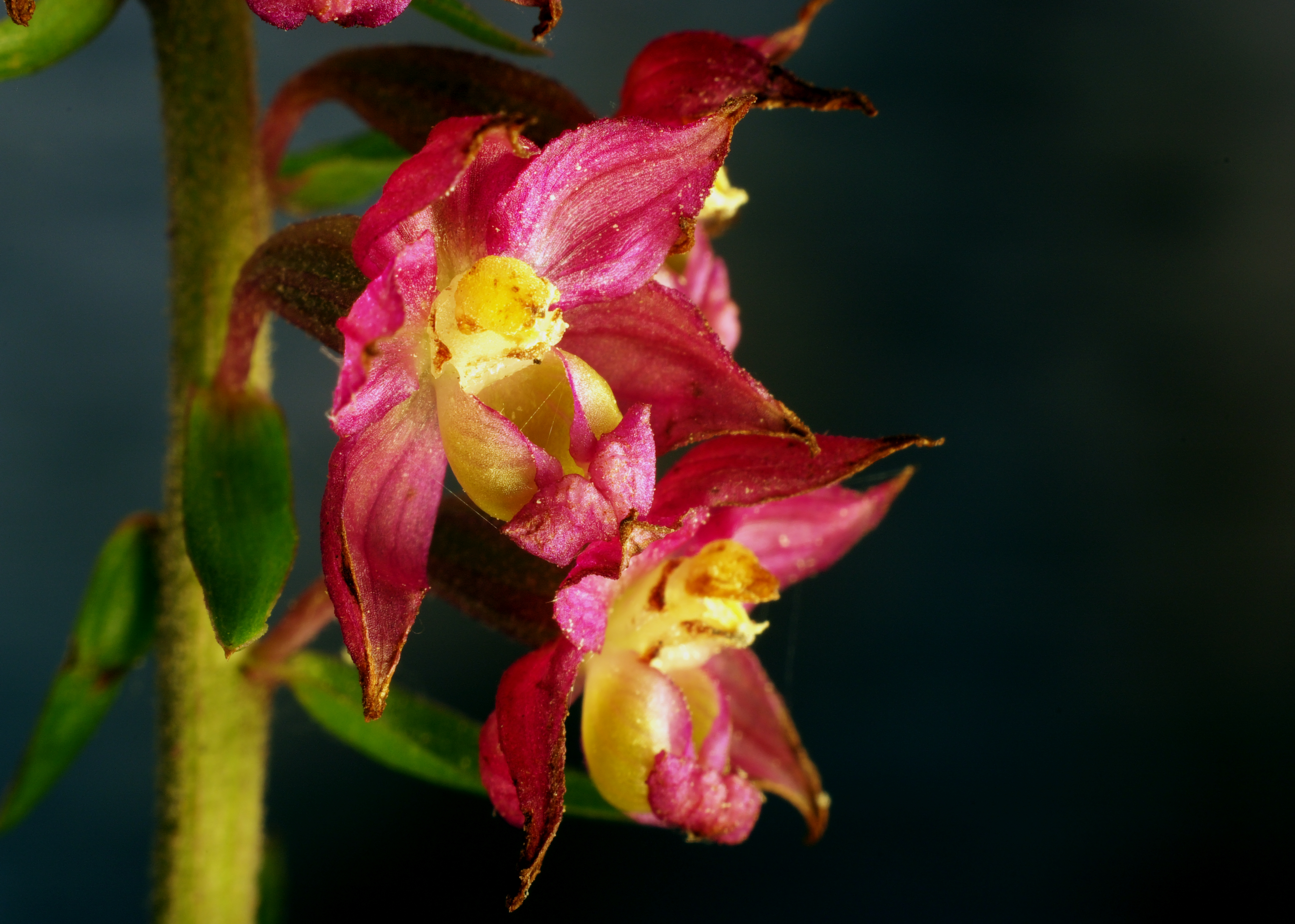
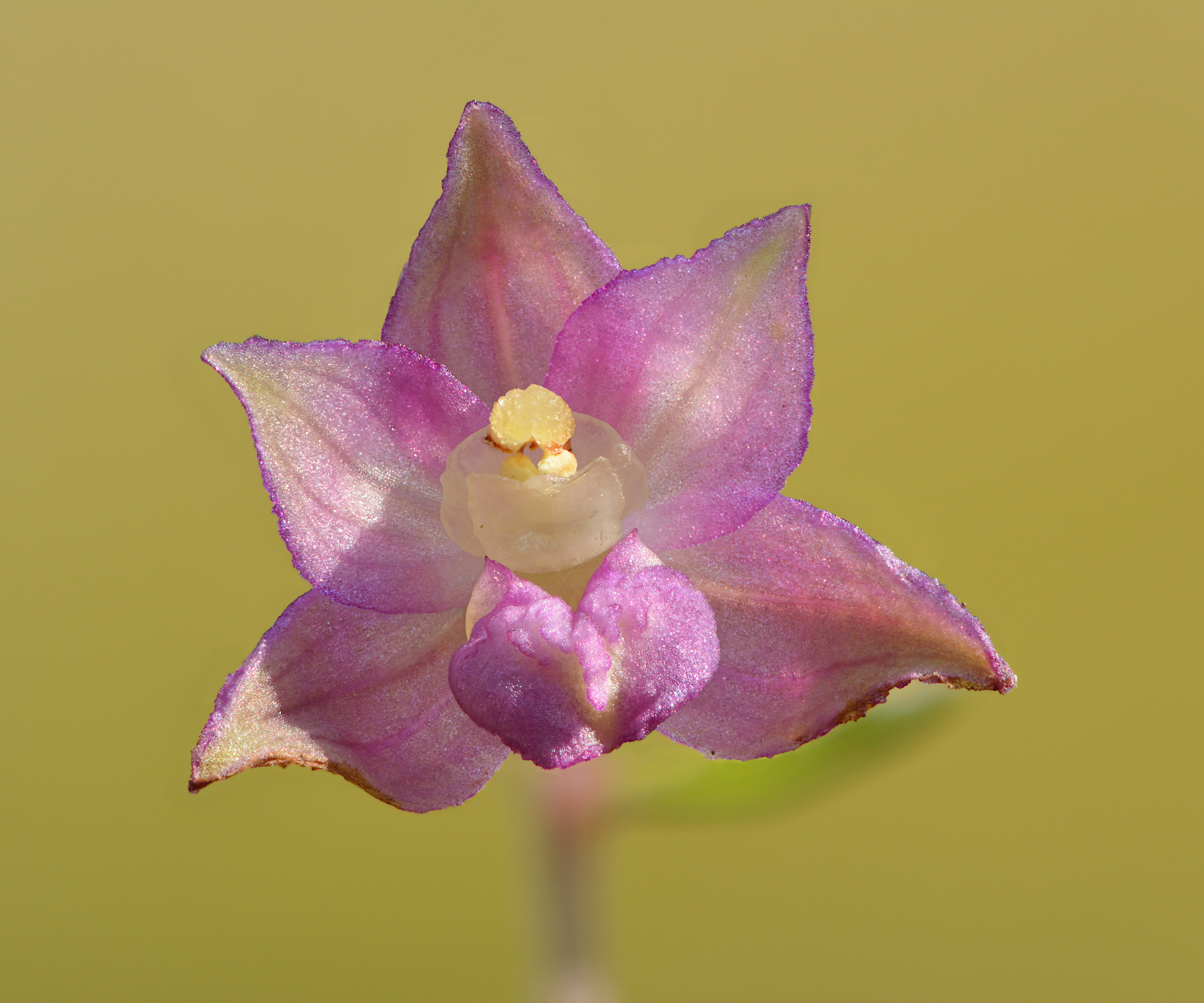
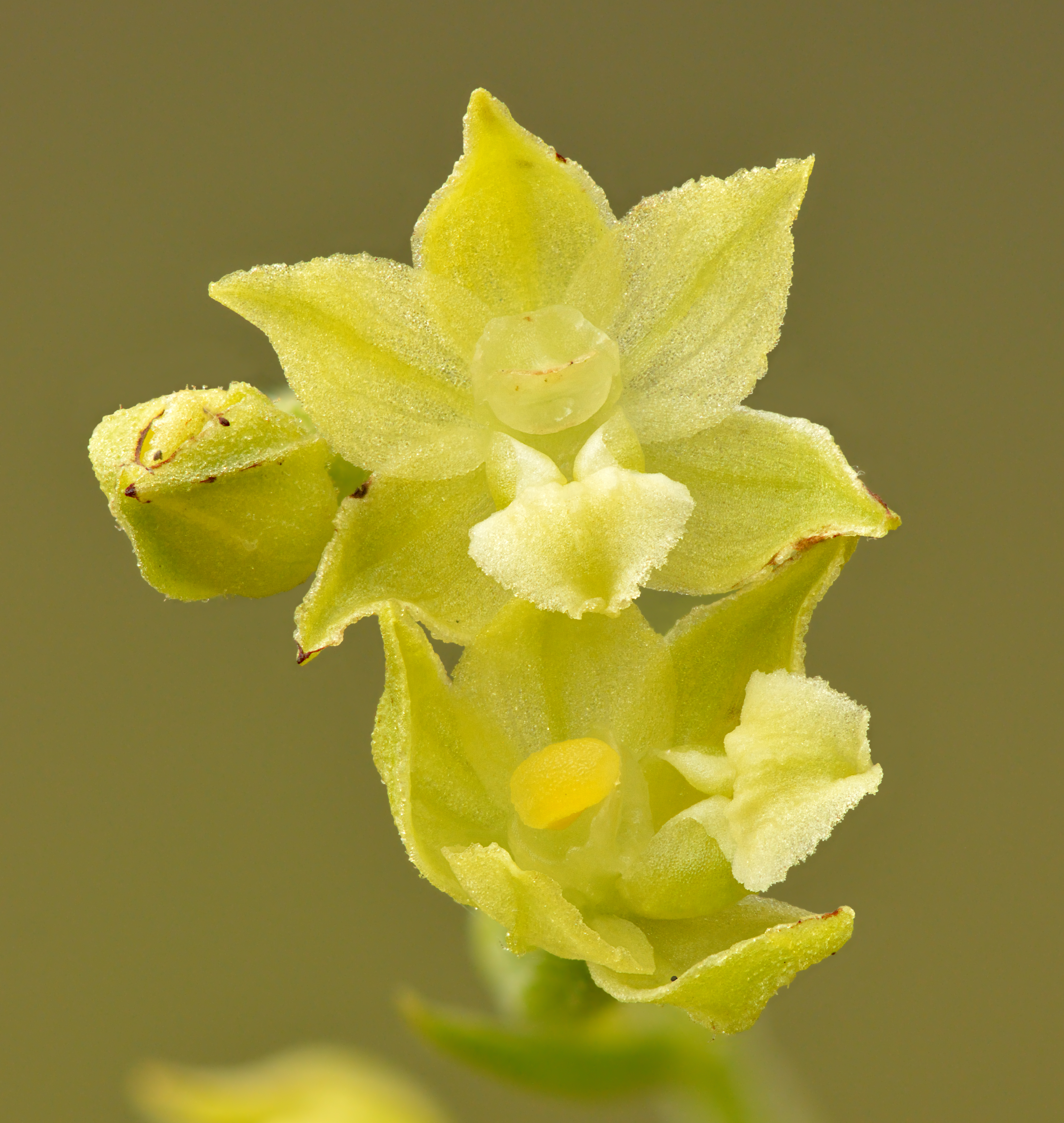
