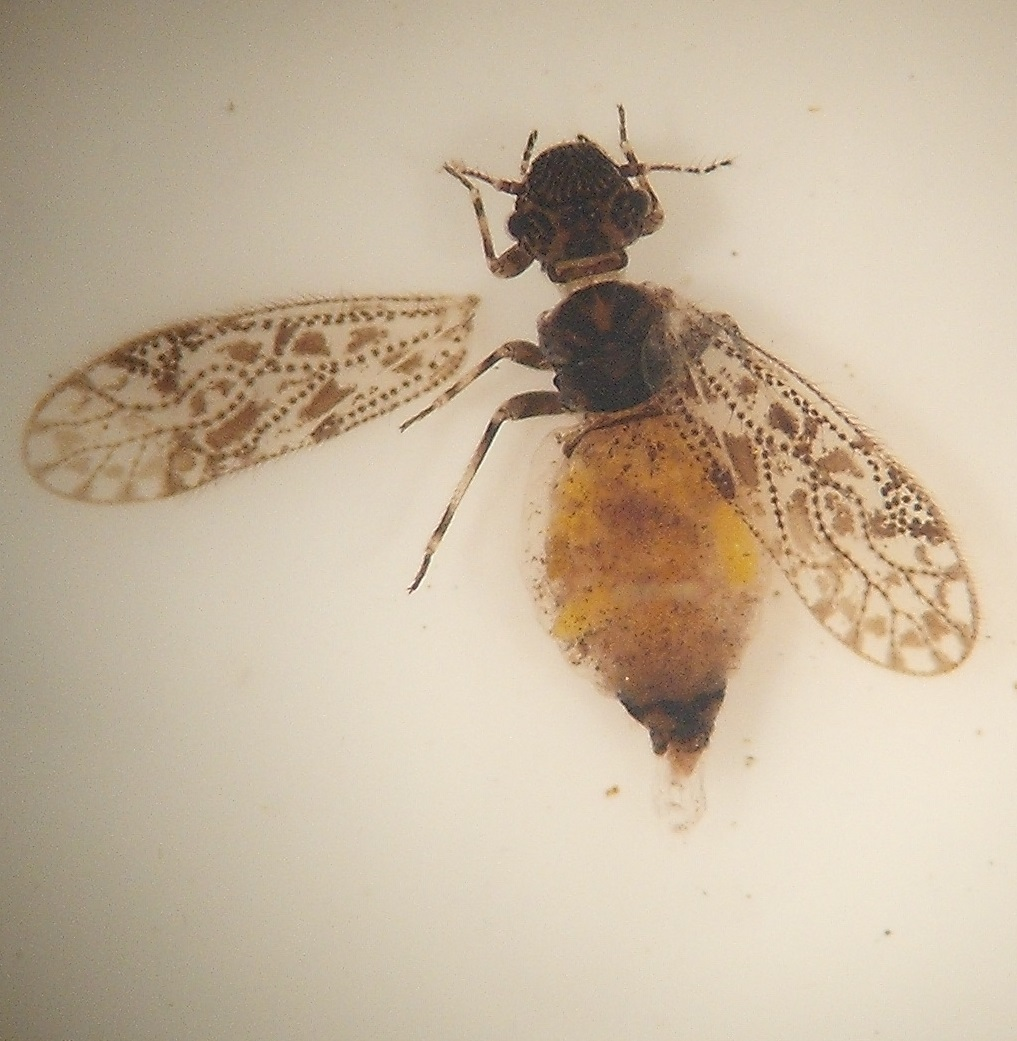
- Aaroniella rawlingsi

Scientific classification
- Domain: Eukaryota
- Kingdom: Animalia
- Phylum: Arthropoda
- Class: Insecta
- Order: Psocodea
- Family: Philotarsidae
- Genus: Aaroniella; Mockford, 1951

= Aaroniella =

Genus of booklice

Aaroniella is a genus of loving barklice in the family Philotarsidae. There are more than 40 described species in Aaroniella.

== Species ==
These 48 species belong to the genus Aaroniella:

- Aaroniella achrysa (Banks, 1941)
- Aaroniella andrei Thornton, 1991
- Aaroniella antennata Thornton & Smithers, 1977
- Aaroniella badonneli (Danks, 1950)
- Aaroniella bakeri Thornton, 1981
- Aaroniella betschi Badonnel, 1976
- Aaroniella bruchi (Williner, 1943)
- Aaroniella caribe (Mockford & Evans, 1976)
- Aaroniella chamelana Garcia Aldrete, 1996
- Aaroniella crista New & Thornton, 1975
- Aaroniella curtifurca Li, 2002
- Aaroniella dentata Mockford & Evans, 1976
- Aaroniella festiva Mockford & Evans, 1976
- Aaroniella flexa Li, 2002
- Aaroniella galapagensis Thornton & Woo, 1973
- Aaroniella glabra New & Thornton, 1975
- Aaroniella glossoptera (Roesler, 1940)
- Aaroniella grandiocula Li, 2002
- Aaroniella gressitti Thornton, Lee & Chui, 1972
- Aaroniella guttulata (Banks, 1916)
- Aaroniella gyratigra Li, 2002
- Aaroniella hoffmannae Garcia Aldrete, 1996
- Aaroniella howensis Smithers & Thornton, 1975
- Aaroniella kepongensis New & Lee, 1992
- Aaroniella lobata Cole, New & Thornton, 1989
- Aaroniella lombokensis Thornton, 1981
- Aaroniella maculosa (Aaron, 1883)
- Aaroniella madecassa Badonnel, 1967
- Aaroniella maligawa Thornton, 1981
- Aaroniella mauritiensis Turner, 1976
- Aaroniella montana Badonnel, 1967
- Aaroniella multipunctata Li, 1995
- Aaroniella nebulosa Vaughan, Thornton & New, 1991
- Aaroniella pardina Li, 1999
- Aaroniella pedunculata Thornton & Smithers, 1977
- Aaroniella pterosoma Thornton, 1981
- Aaroniella pulchra Thornton, 1959
- Aaroniella rawlingsi Smithers, 1969
- Aaroniella recta New & Thornton, 1975
- Aaroniella reunionensis Turner, 1976
- Aaroniella samoana (Karny, 1932)
- Aaroniella serialis (Banks, 1937)
- Aaroniella sinuosa Mockford, 1996
- Aaroniella spenceri Thornton, 1981
- Aaroniella stictica (Navas, 1932)
- Aaroniella sudarmani Vaughan, Thornton & New, 1991
- Aaroniella ternata Li, 1999
- Aaroniella trukensis Thornton, Lee & Chui, 1972
