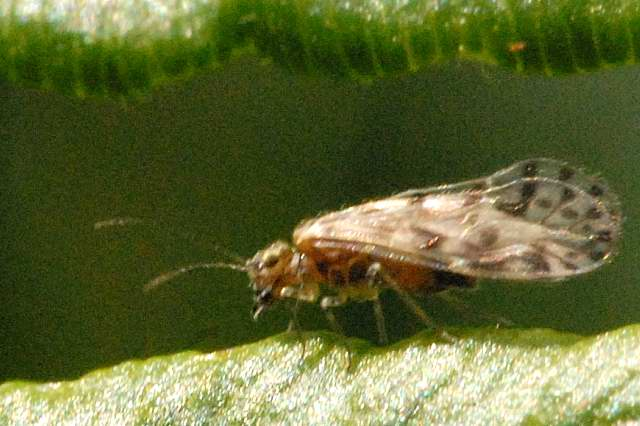

Scientific classification
- Domain: Eukaryota
- Kingdom: Animalia
- Phylum: Arthropoda
- Class: Insecta
- Order: Psocodea
- Family: Philotarsidae
- Genus: Philotarsus; Kolbe, 1880

= Philotarsus =

Genus of booklice

Philotarsus is a genus of loving barklice in the family Philotarsidae. There are about 18 described species in Philotarsus.

== Species ==
These 18 species belong to the genus Philotarsus:

- Philotarsus arizonicus Mockford, 2007
- Philotarsus californicus Mockford, 2007
- Philotarsus digitatus Mockford, 2007
- Philotarsus fraternus Enderlein, 1901
- Philotarsus incurvatus Mockford, 2007
- Philotarsus kwakiutl Mockford, 1951
- Philotarsus lobatus Mockford, 2007
- Philotarsus longipennis Mockford, 2007
- Philotarsus mexicanus Mockford, 2007
- Philotarsus nebulosus Mockford, 2007
- Philotarsus parviceps Roesler, 1954
- Philotarsus picicornis (Fabricius, 1793)
- Philotarsus potosinus Mockford, 2007
- Philotarsus sinensis Li, 1997
- Philotarsus thorntoni Turner, 1984
- Philotarsus zangdaicus Li, 2002
- Philotarsus zangxiaoicus Li, 2002
- † Philotarsus bullicornis Enderlein, 1911
