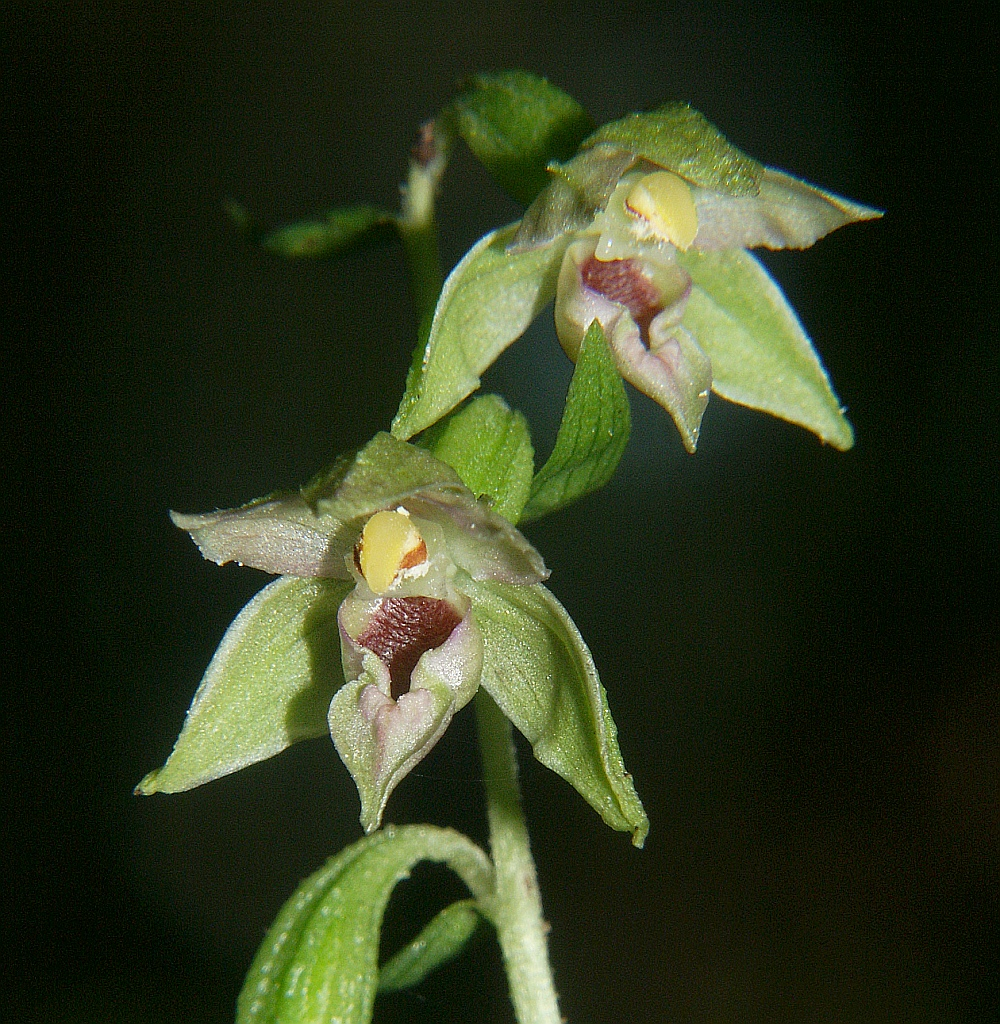

Scientific classification
- Kingdom: Plantae
- Clade: Tracheophytes
- Clade: Angiosperms
- Clade: Monocots
- Order: Asparagales
- Family: Orchidaceae
- Subfamily: Epidendroideae
- Genus: Epipactis
- Species: E. leptochila

Binomial name
- Epipactis leptochila (Godfery) Godfery

Synonyms
- Epipactis viridiflora (Blume) Ames var. leptochila

= Epipactis leptochila =

Species of orchid

Epipactis leptochila, the narrow-lipped helleborine, is a species of orchid in the genus Epipactis, which is found in chalk or limestone-based beech and hornbeam woodland in southern England and Wales. The narrow-lipped helleborine blooms from early June to mid-August. Epipactis leptochila is also found in parts of northern Europe. Due to habitat loss, the species is scarce and declining in the United Kingdom, where it can mainly be found in the Cotswolds and the Chiltern Hills.
