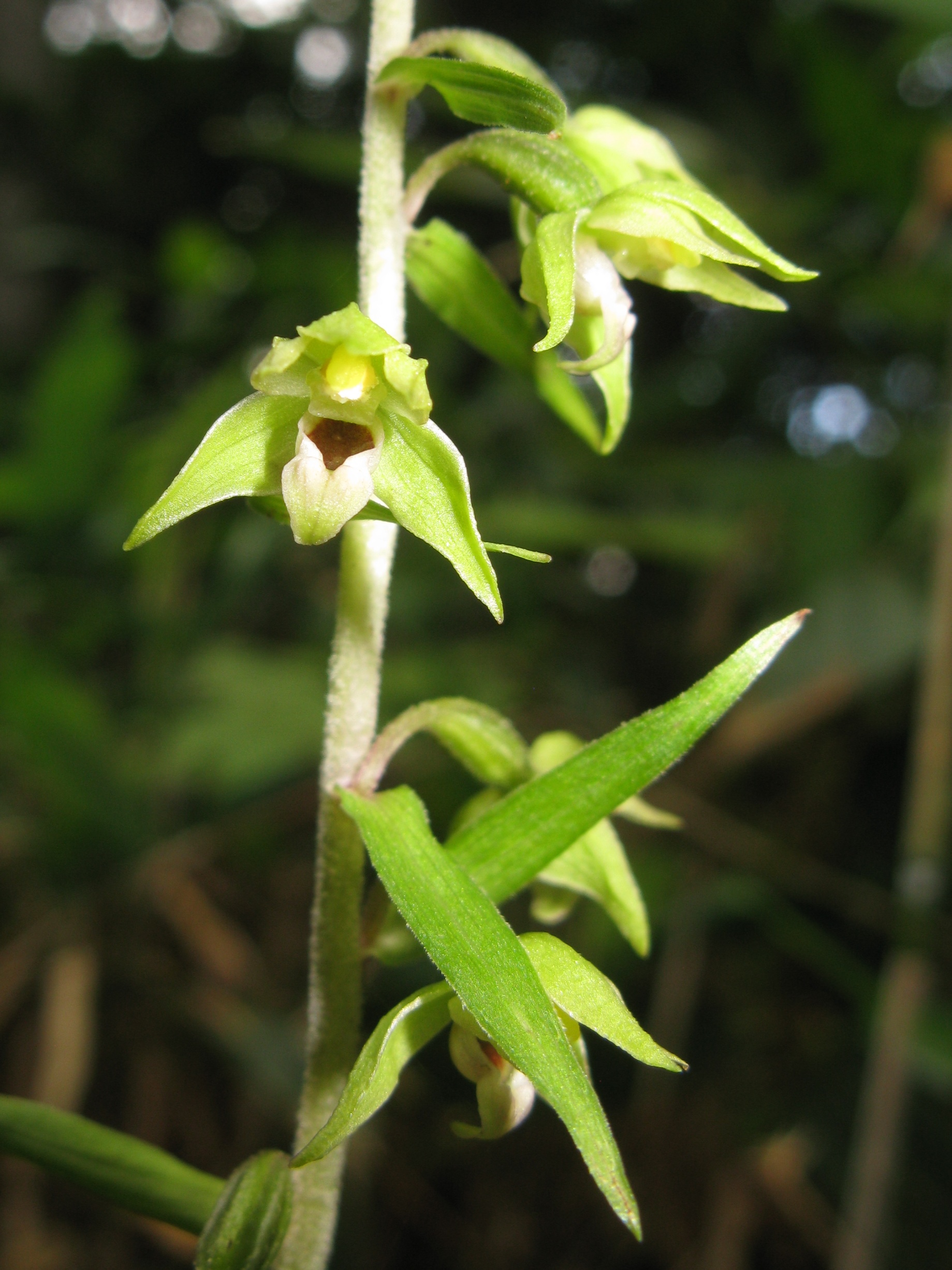

Scientific classification
- Kingdom: Plantae
- Clade: Tracheophytes
- Clade: Angiosperms
- Clade: Monocots
- Order: Asparagales
- Family: Orchidaceae
- Subfamily: Epidendroideae
- Genus: Epipactis
- Species: E. papillosa

Binomial name
- Epipactis papillosa Franchet & Savatier

Synonyms
- Limodorum papillosum (Franch. & Sav.) Kuntze; Epipactis latifolia var. papillosa (Franch. & Sav.) Maxim. ex Kom.; Helleborine papillosa (Franch. & Sav.) Druce; Amesia papillosa (Franch. & Sav.) A.Nelson & J.F.Macbr.; Epipactis helleborine var. papillosa (Franch. & Sav.) T.Hashim.; Epipactis sayekiana Makino; Serapias sayekiana (Makino) Makino; Epipactis papillosa var. sayekiana (Makino) T.Koyama & Asai; Epipactis helleborine var. sayekiana (Makino) T.Hashim.; Epipactis papillosa var. imkoeensis Y.N.Lee & K.S.Lee

= Epipactis papillosa =

Species of orchid

Epipactis papillosa is an orchid from the genus Epipactis. Epipactis papillosa is found from the Russia Far East (Kamchatka, Sakhalin, Primorye, Kuril Islands, Khabarovsk), northeastern China (Liaoning), Korea and Japan. It grows 30–70 cm tall and has five to seven leaves. It blooms in the fall with 10-20 pale green flowers. It grows in forests.

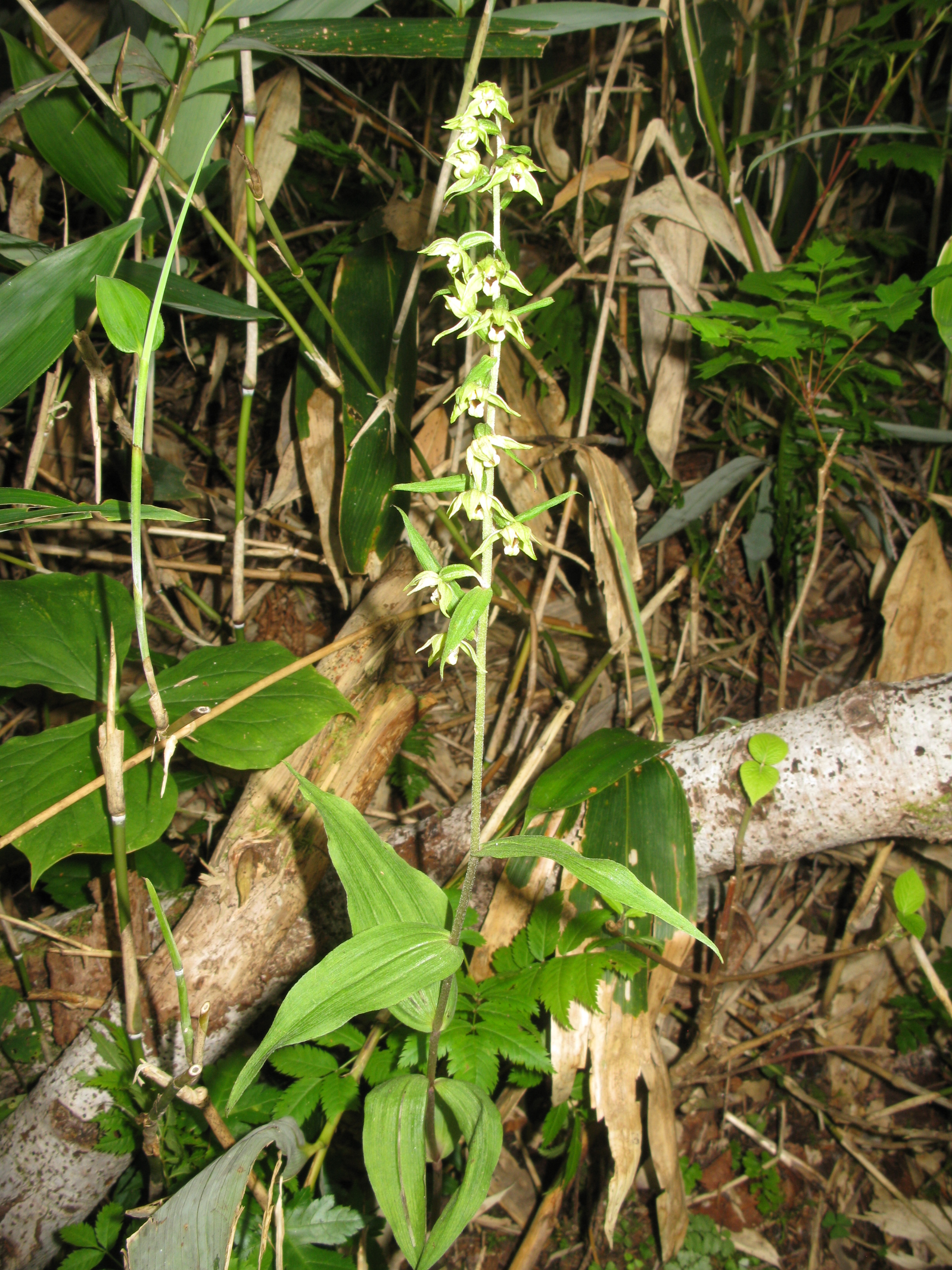
Epipactis papillosa
