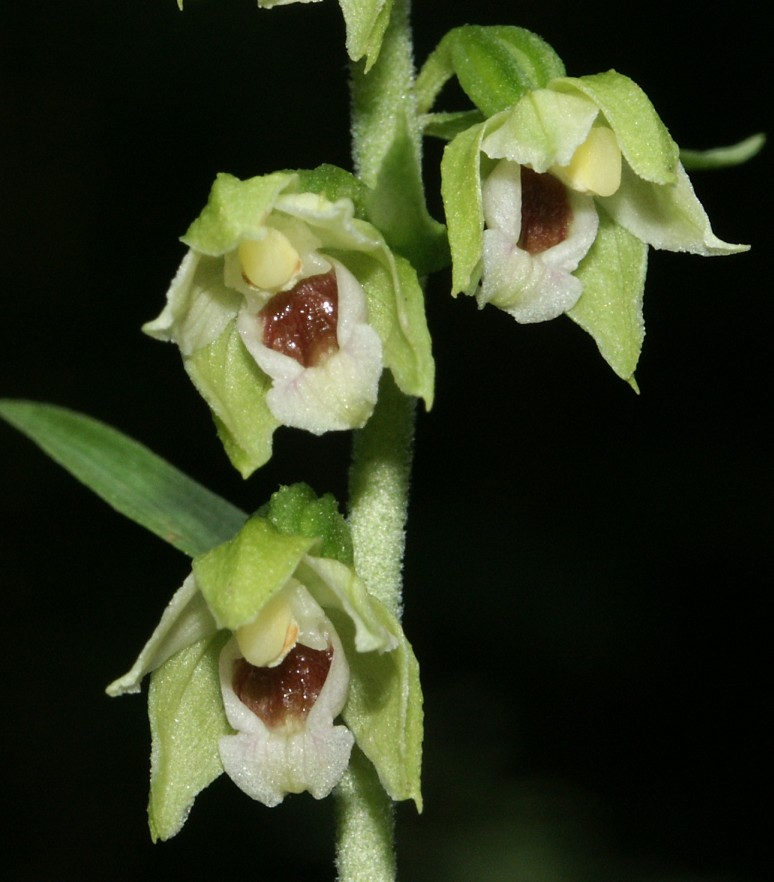

Conservation status
- Least Concern (IUCN 3.1)

Scientific classification
- Kingdom: Plantae
- Clade: Tracheophytes
- Clade: Angiosperms
- Clade: Monocots
- Order: Asparagales
- Family: Orchidaceae
- Subfamily: Epidendroideae
- Genus: Epipactis
- Species: E. muelleri

Binomial name
- Epipactis muelleri Godfery

Synonyms
- Helleborine muelleri (Godfery) Bech.; Epipactis helleborine ssp. muelleri (Godfery) O. Bolòs

= Epipactis muelleri =

Species of orchid

Epipactis muelleri is a species of orchid. This species is native to many countries in Europe. The species is threatened by destruction of forests with its population on decline, although the overall risk of its extinction on a global level is very low.
