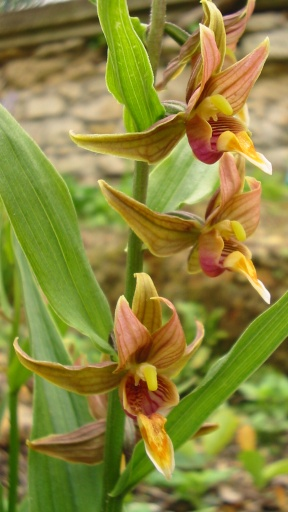

Conservation status
- Apparently Secure (NatureServe)

Scientific classification
- Kingdom: Plantae
- Clade: Embryophytes
- Clade: Tracheophytes
- Clade: Spermatophytes
- Clade: Angiosperms
- Clade: Monocots
- Order: Asparagales
- Family: Orchidaceae
- Subfamily: Epidendroideae
- Genus: Epipactis
- Species: E. gigantea

Binomial name
- Epipactis gigantea Douglas

Synonyms
- List: Amesia gigantea; Arthrochilium giganteum; Cephalanthera kokanica; Epipactis americana; Epipactis pringlei; Helleborine gigantea; Limodorum giganteum; Peramium giganteum; Serapias gigantea

= Epipactis gigantea =

Western North American species of orchid

Epipactis gigantea is a species of orchid known as the stream orchid, giant helleborine, and chatterbox. This wildflower is native to western North America from British Columbia to central Mexico. This is one of the most abundant orchids of the Pacific coast of North America.

== Description ==
Epipactis gigantea is an erect perennial reaching anywhere from 30 centimeters to one meter in height. Its stems have prominently-veined, wide or narrow lance-shaped leaves 5 to 15 centimeters long and inflorescences of two or three showy orchids near the top. Each flower has three straight sepals which are light brownish or greenish with darker veining, each one to two centimeters long. The two top petals are similar in shape and reddish-brown with purple veins. The lowest petal is cup-shaped with a pointed, tongue-like protuberance and is brighter red-brown and more starkly veined, often with areas of yellow. The fruit is a hanging capsule 2 or 3 centimeters long which contains thousands of tiny seeds. This plant grows in wet areas in a variety of habitats, including riverbanks, hot springs, and meadows at elevations less than 2,600 feet. Unlike some of its relatives, this species is an autotroph. A distinctive race with burgundy colored foliage is known from The Cedars in Sonoma County California, an area of serpentine rock, and it is called forma rubrifolia (P M Brown).

== Taxonomy ==
Epipactis gigantea was scientifically described and named by David Douglas in 1839. It is classified in the genus Epipactis as a part of the family Orchidaceae. It has no accepted subspecies or forms, but has 10 synonyms.

Table of Synonyms
Name	Year	Rank	Notes
Amesia gigantea (Douglas) A.Nelson & J.F.Macbr.	1913	species	≡ hom.
Arthrochilium giganteum (Douglas) Szlach.	2003	species	≡ hom.
Cephalanthera kokanica Regel ex Nevski	1935	species	= het., pro syn.
Epipactis americana Lindl.	1840	species	= het.
Epipactis gigantea f. rubrifolia P.M.Br.	1995	form	= het.
Epipactis pringlei Gand.	1919	species	= het.
Helleborine gigantea (Douglas) Druce	1909	species	≡ hom.
Limodorum giganteum (Douglas) Kuntze	1891	species	≡ hom., nom. illeg.
Peramium giganteum (Douglas) J.M.Coult.	1894	species	≡ hom.
Serapias gigantea (Douglas) A.A.Eaton	1908	species	≡ hom.
Notes: ≡ homotypic synonym; = heterotypic synonym

== Cultivation ==
Epipactis gigantea is cultivated in the specialty horticulture trade and available as a non-wild collected propagated ornamental plant. A maroon-leaved (forma rubrifolia) cultivar is also grown, called 'Serpentine Night'.

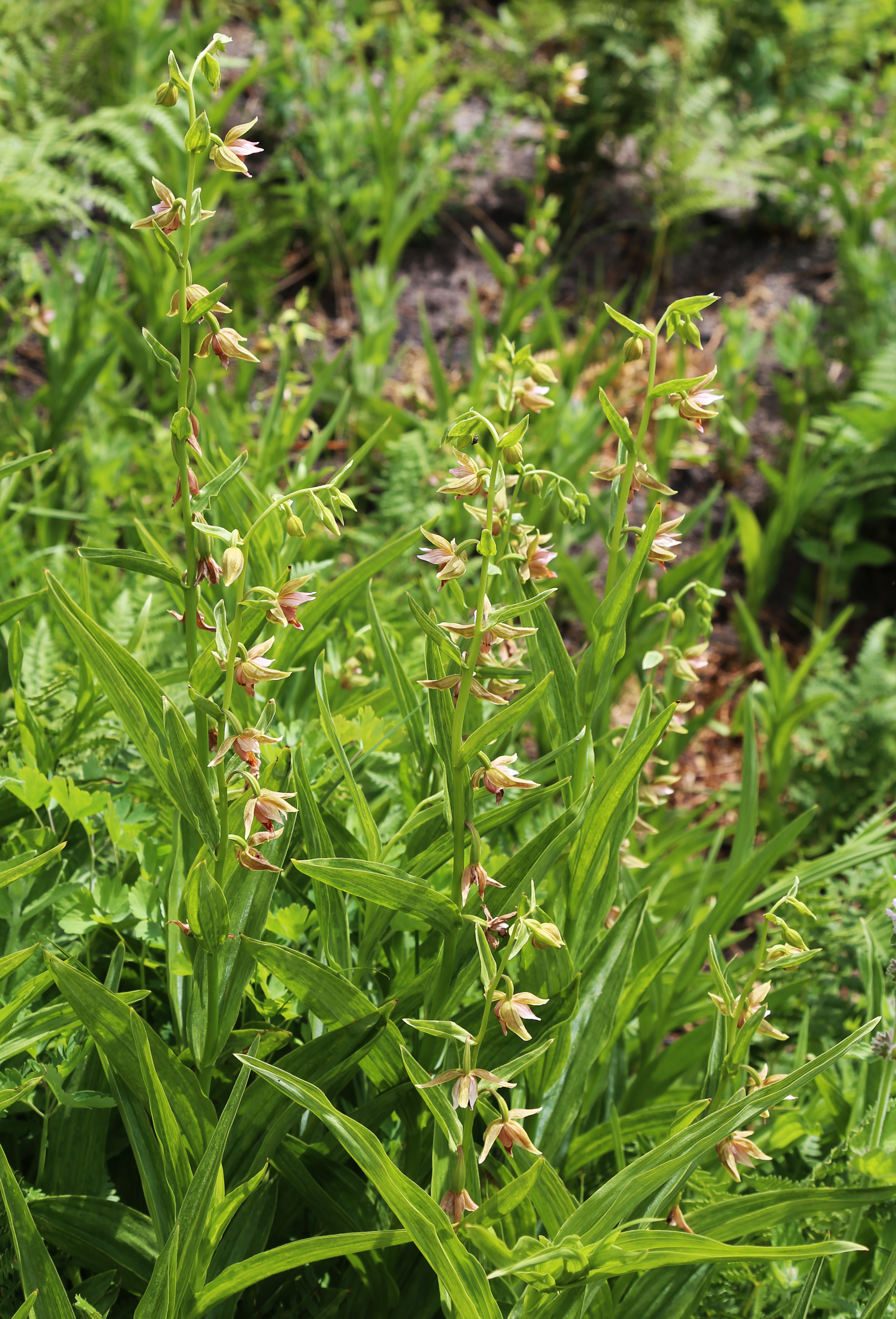
E gigantea clump in moist meadow

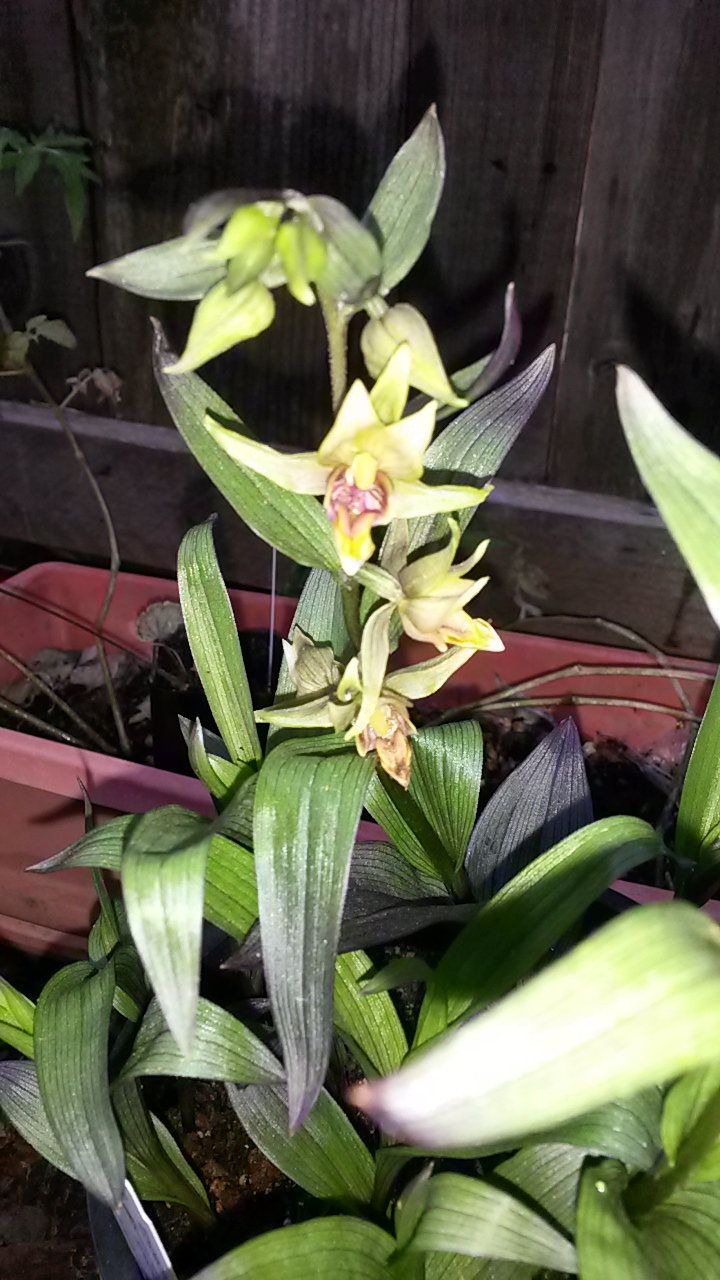
Cultivar Serpentine Night

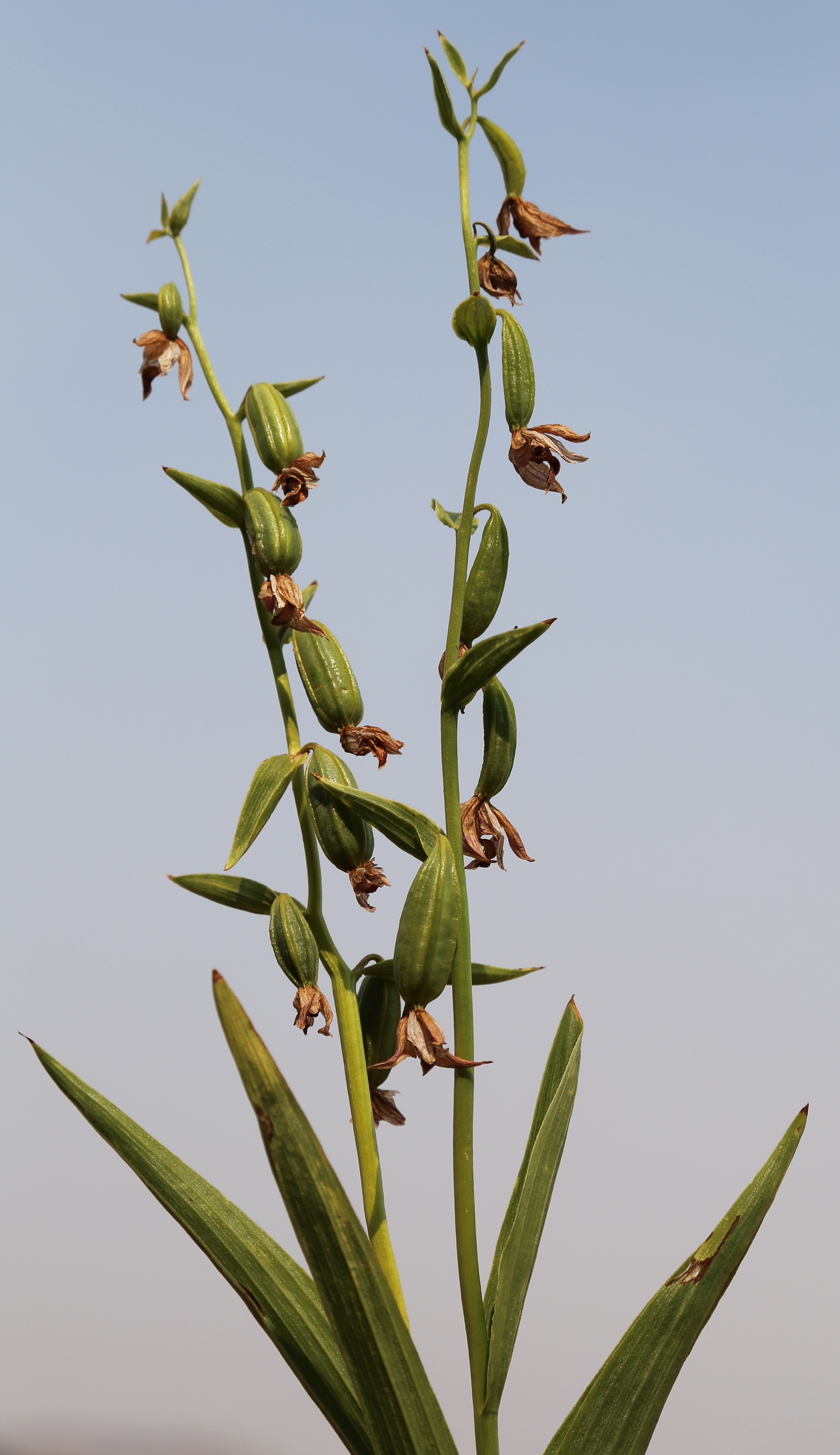
Stream orchid seedheads

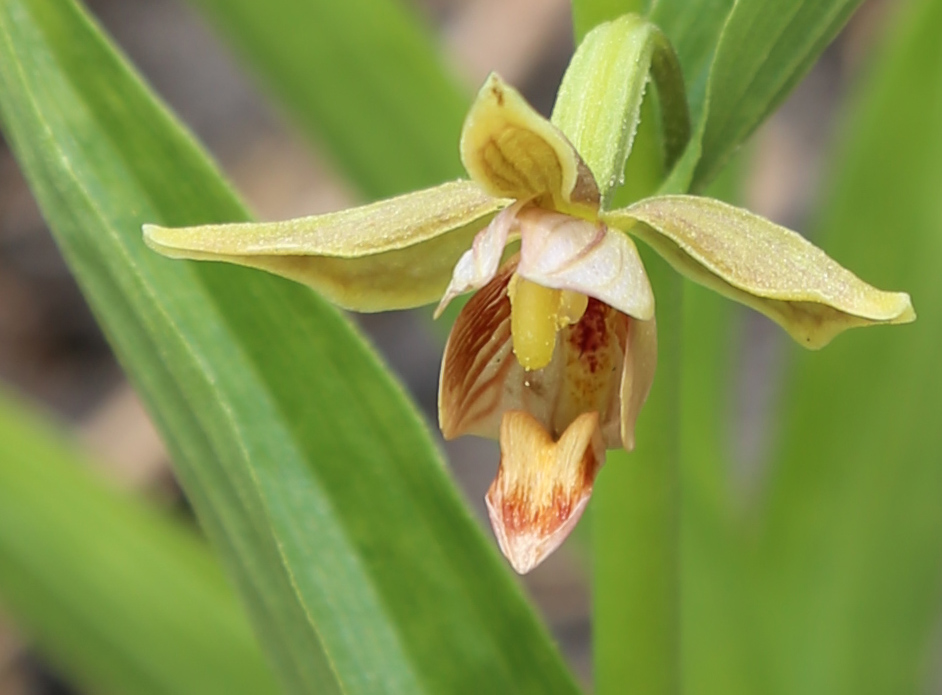
E gigantea flower closeup
