= Novopsocus magnus =

Scientific classification
- Kingdom: Animalia
- Phylum: Arthropoda
- Class: Insecta
- Order: Psocodea
- Family: Pseudocaeciliidae
- Genus: Novopsocus
- Species: N. magnus

Binomial name
- Novopsocus magnus Cuénoud

Species of booklouse

Novopsocus magnus is a species of Pseudocaeciliidae that lives on the island of New Guinea. Males of this species were first thought by Thornton (1984) to be males of N. stenopterus, but Cuénoud (2008) showed that it is indeed a separate species by identifying real males of N. stenopterus and actual females of N. magnus. It is the largest species of the genus, and its males have peculiar antennae, with a first flagellar segment strongly broadened and flattened.
