= Epipactis ohwii =

Scientific classification
- Kingdom: Plantae
- Clade: Tracheophytes
- Clade: Angiosperms
- Clade: Monocots
- Order: Asparagales
- Family: Orchidaceae
- Subfamily: Epidendroideae
- Genus: Epipactis
- Species: E. ohwii

Binomial name
- Epipactis ohwii Fukuy. (1934)

Species of orchid

Epipactis ohwii is a species of terrestrial orchid endemic to central Taiwan. It was originally described by Noriaki Fukuyama in 1934. The species is a geophyte with underground rhizomes, and is found in temperate areas.
