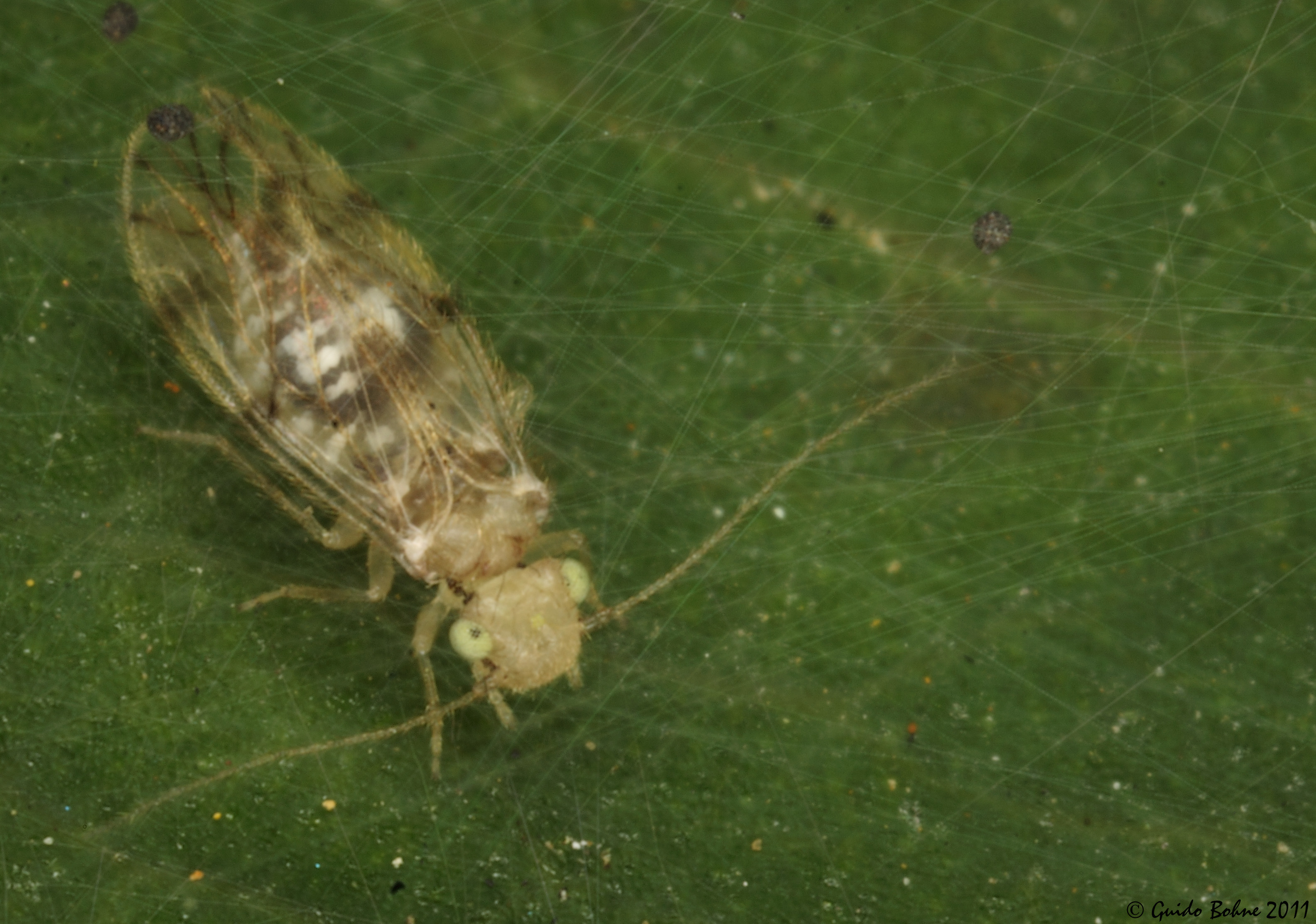

Scientific classification
- Kingdom: Animalia
- Phylum: Arthropoda
- Clade: Pancrustacea
- Class: Insecta
- Order: Psocodea
- Family: Pseudocaeciliidae
- Subfamily: Pseudocaeciliinae
- Genus: Pseudocaecilius; Enderlein, 1903

= Pseudocaecilius =

Genus of booklice

Pseudocaecilius is a genus of false lizard barklice in the family Pseudocaeciliidae. There are more than 50 described species in Pseudocaecilius.

== Species ==
These 53 species belong to the genus Pseudocaecilius:

- Pseudocaecilius africanus Badonnel, 1931
- Pseudocaecilius angustus (Enderlein, 1903)
- Pseudocaecilius bibulbus Li, 1993
- Pseudocaecilius bicostatus Li, 2002
- Pseudocaecilius brevicornis Enderlein, 1931
- Pseudocaecilius ceratocercus Li, 2002
- Pseudocaecilius citricola (Ashmead, 1879)
- Pseudocaecilius claggi (Banks, 1937)
- Pseudocaecilius clunialis Vaughan, Thornton & New, 1991
- Pseudocaecilius cornutus Lee & Thornton, 1967
- Pseudocaecilius cribrarius (Hagen, 1859)
- Pseudocaecilius danaus Lee & New, 1992
- Pseudocaecilius euryocercus Li, 2002
- Pseudocaecilius fletcheri Datta, 1965
- Pseudocaecilius formosanus (Banks, 1937)
- Pseudocaecilius funestus (Enderlein, 1903)
- Pseudocaecilius galactozonalis Li, 2002
- Pseudocaecilius helicoides Lee & Thornton, 1967
- Pseudocaecilius hispidus Enderlein, 1913
- Pseudocaecilius immaculatus Li, 2002
- Pseudocaecilius inaequalis (Banks, 1916)
- Pseudocaecilius innotatus Banks, 1937
- Pseudocaecilius kagoshimensis (Okamoto, 1910)
- Pseudocaecilius katmanduensis New, 1971
- Pseudocaecilius lanatus (Hagen, 1859)
- Pseudocaecilius largicellus Li, 2002
- Pseudocaecilius machadoi Badonnel, 1955
- Pseudocaecilius maculosus Enderlein, 1907
- Pseudocaecilius marshalli Karny, 1926
- Pseudocaecilius molestus (Hagen, 1859)
- Pseudocaecilius monotaeniatus Li, 2002
- Pseudocaecilius morstatti Enderlein, 1913
- Pseudocaecilius nitoris (Banks, 1937)
- Pseudocaecilius octomaculatus Li, 2002
- Pseudocaecilius otiosus (Banks, 1937)
- Pseudocaecilius papillaris Li, 2002
- Pseudocaecilius paraornatus New, 1977
- Pseudocaecilius plagiozonalis Li, 1995
- Pseudocaecilius productus New & Thornton, 1976
- Pseudocaecilius pusillus (Banks, 1931)
- Pseudocaecilius ranus Thornton, 1984
- Pseudocaecilius serratus Lee & New, 1992
- Pseudocaecilius setifer Vaughan, Thornton & New, 1991
- Pseudocaecilius sexdentatus Li, 2002
- Pseudocaecilius tahitiensis (Karny, 1926)
- Pseudocaecilius tenellus Enderlein, 1926
- Pseudocaecilius testaceus Enderlein, 1903
- Pseudocaecilius undecimimaculatus Li, 1995
- Pseudocaecilius utricularis Li, 1999
- Pseudocaecilius venimaculatus Li, 2002
- Pseudocaecilius villosus (Enderlein, 1903)
- Pseudocaecilius wellsae Lee & New, 1992
- Pseudocaecilius zonatus (Hagen, 1859)
