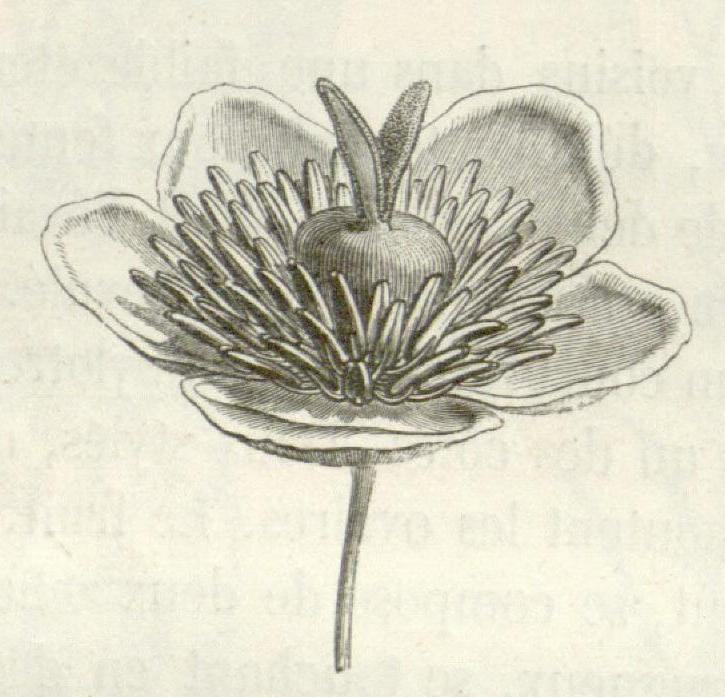

Scientific classification
- Kingdom: Plantae
- Clade: Embryophytes
- Clade: Tracheophytes
- Clade: Angiosperms
- Clade: Eudicots
- Order: Caryophyllales
- Family: Barbeuiaceae; Nakai
- Genus: Barbeuia; Thouars
- Species: B. madagascariensis

Binomial name
- Barbeuia madagascariensis Steud.

= Barbeuia =

Genus of flowering plants

Barbeuia madagascariensis is a liana found only on the island of Madagascar.

Barbeuia has occasionally been placed in its own family, Barbeuiaceae. The APG II system of 2003, for instance, recognizes such a family and assigns it to the order Caryophyllales in the clade core eudicots, after Philippe Cuénoud sequenced a fragment of the matK gene (extracted from a seed deposited in the Kew Herbarium) and showed that Barbeuia does not belong in Phytolaccaceae. This represents a change from the APG system, of 1998, which did not recognize Barbeuiaceae as a family, for lack of molecular data.
