= Vincent Savolainen =

Biologist (born 1966)

Vincent Savolainen is an evolutionary biologist.

Savolainen was born on 27 September 1966. He is of Finnish origin and holds Swiss, British, and French citizenship. Savolainen earned his undergraduate degree from the University of Geneva and obtained his doctorate at the same institution, three years before Philippe Cuénoud. He teaches at Imperial College London. Savolainen was elected as a fellow and the 2006 recipient of the Bicentenary Medal awarded by the Linnean Society. In 2009, the Royal Society of Biology granted Savolainen a fellowship. Following his election as a member of the European Molecular Biology Organisation in 2014, the Zoological Society of London awarded Savolainen a fellowship in 2015.
