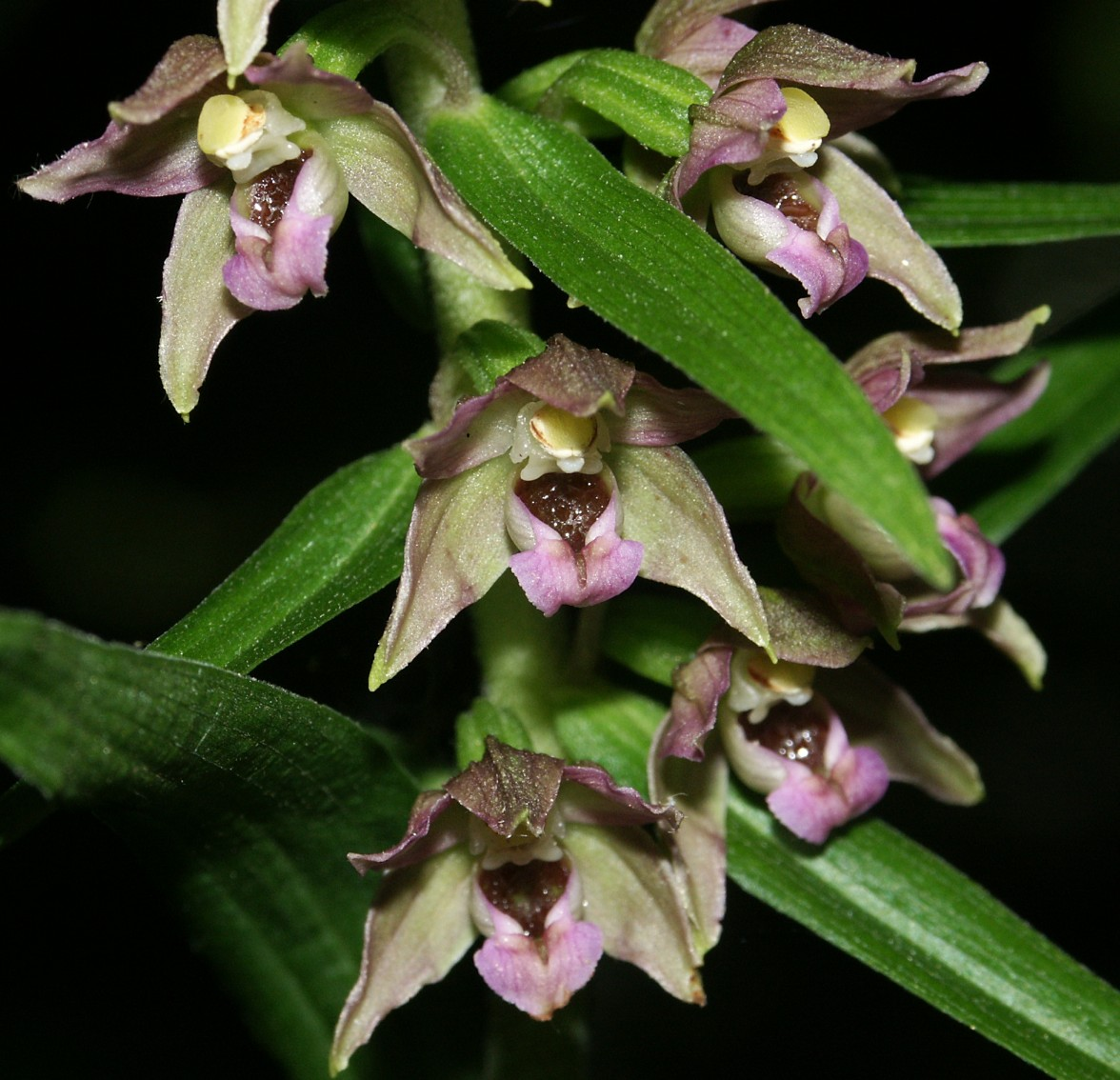
- Broad-leaved helleborine (Epipactis helleborine)

Scientific classification
- Kingdom: Plantae
- Clade: Embryophytes
- Clade: Tracheophytes
- Clade: Angiosperms
- Clade: Monocots
- Order: Asparagales
- Family: Orchidaceae
- Subfamily: Epidendroideae
- Tribe: Neottieae
- Genus: Epipactis; Zinn 1757

Type species
- Epipactis helleborine

Species
- See text

= Epipactis =

Genus of orchids

Epipactis, or helleborine, is a genus of terrestrial orchids consisting of approximately 70 species. This genus is abbreviated as Epcts in horticultural trade.

== Description ==
Their creeping, fleshy rhizomes grow offshoots, from which then emerge the 20–70 cm long stems during the next spring.

There are four to eight alternate, lanceolate leaves, that grow progressively shorter near the top. The margins are entire, the top is acute. Species with less chlorophyll have blue-purple leaves.

Their bilaterally symmetrical colorful flowers grow from a terminal raceme. The three sepals and the two lateral petals are ovate and acuminate. Their color can vary from greenish-white to violet and purple.

The lip is divided in a bowl-shaped hypochile, with the outer surface greenish-white and threaded with dark veins. The wavy, snow-white epichile is fan-shaped.

The ovary is inferior. It produces a dry capsule with countless minute seeds.

== Chemistry ==
As is characteristic of all orchids, Epipactis spp. are dependent on a mycorrhizal symbiosis (see also Orchid mycorrhiza). This allows some species to have reduced leaves and need little chlorophyll. Violet helleborine (Epipactis viridiflora) can even do without chlorophyll. These forms can be recognized by their purple instead of violet flowers.

== Habitat ==
The species occur in temperate and subtropical climates of America, Asia, and Europe. These orchids grow in open spaces in forests, in undergrowth, on calcareous soils and are often found in wet dune-slacks near the sea. The only original American species is the giant helleborine (Epipactis gigantea). One species from Europe, broad-leaved helleborine (Epipactis helleborine), is invasive in North America. Most species are protected.

Most of these hardy orchids grow in a wet environment, but there are exceptions. The marsh helleborine (Epipactis palustris) is the only European orchid able to survive in a flooded habitat. Epipactis gigantea is a species found in the American west, and into southern Canada, in wet areas and even streams. It can grow to a height of 1 m. However, Epipactis helleborine grows in more diverse habitats, from sheltered sandy beaches to open spaces in deciduous or coniferous forests, on roadsides, in meadows, and on moist soils. It is sometimes called the weed orchid.

== Species ==
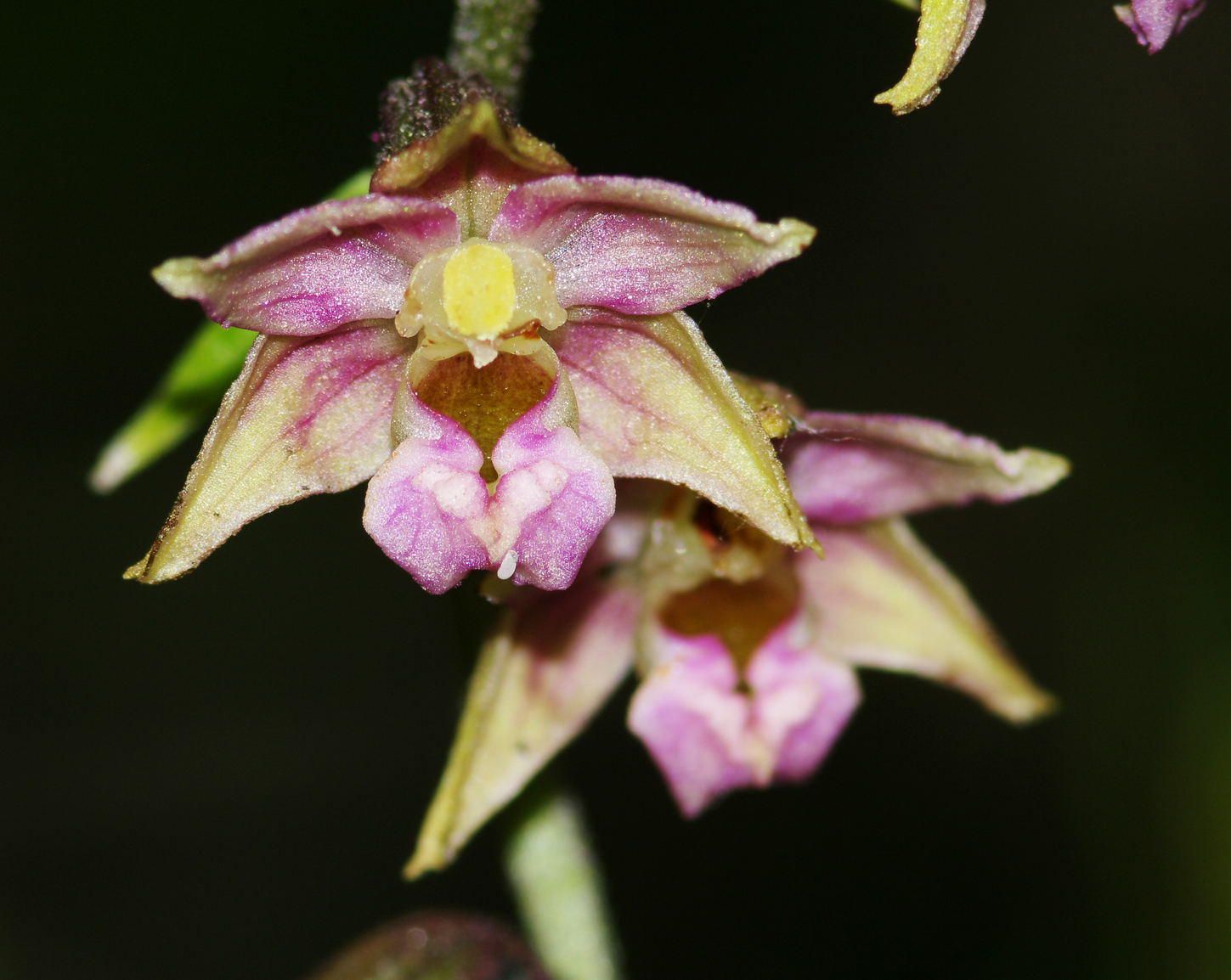
Broad-leaved helleborine

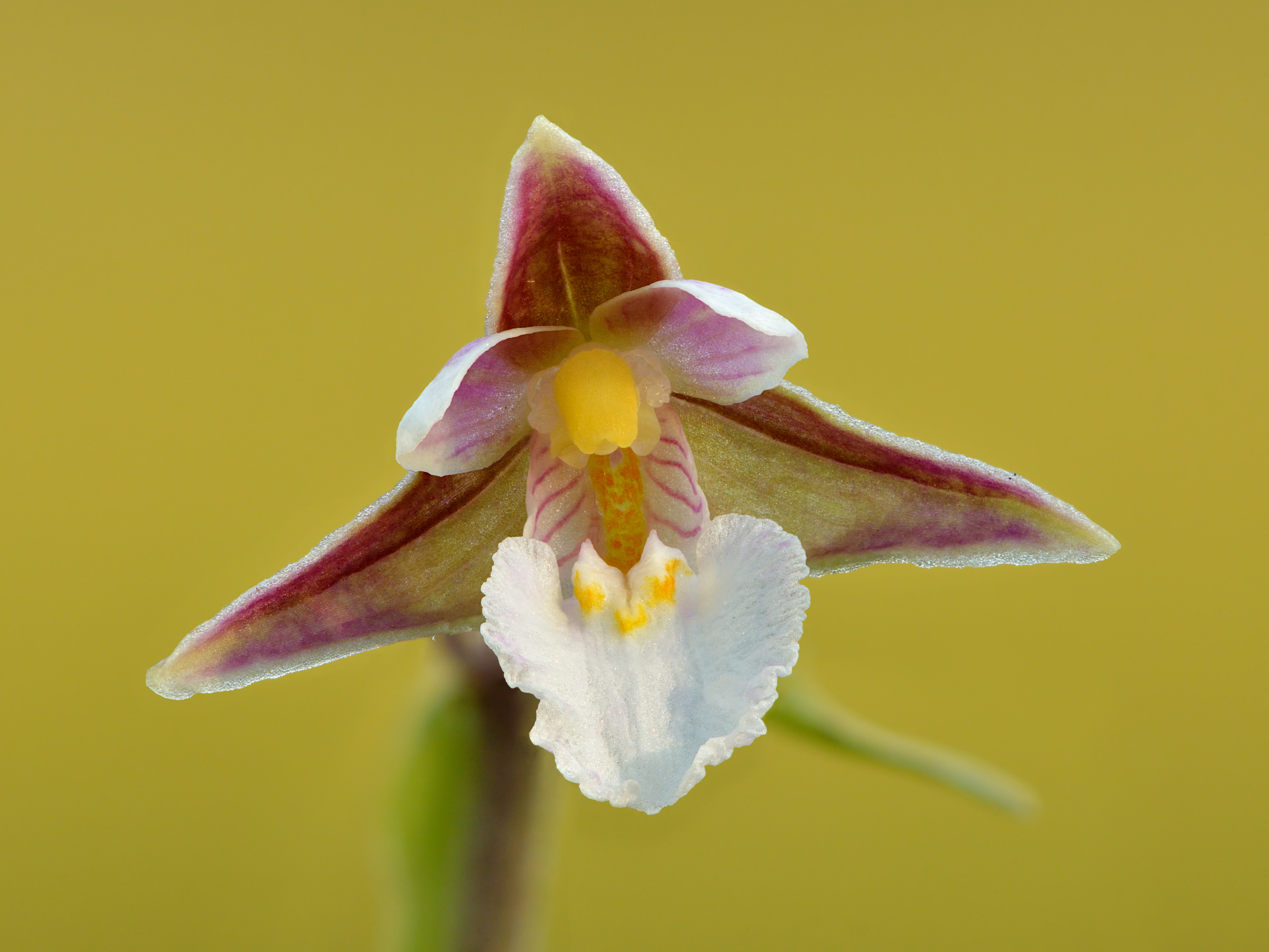
Marsh helleborine

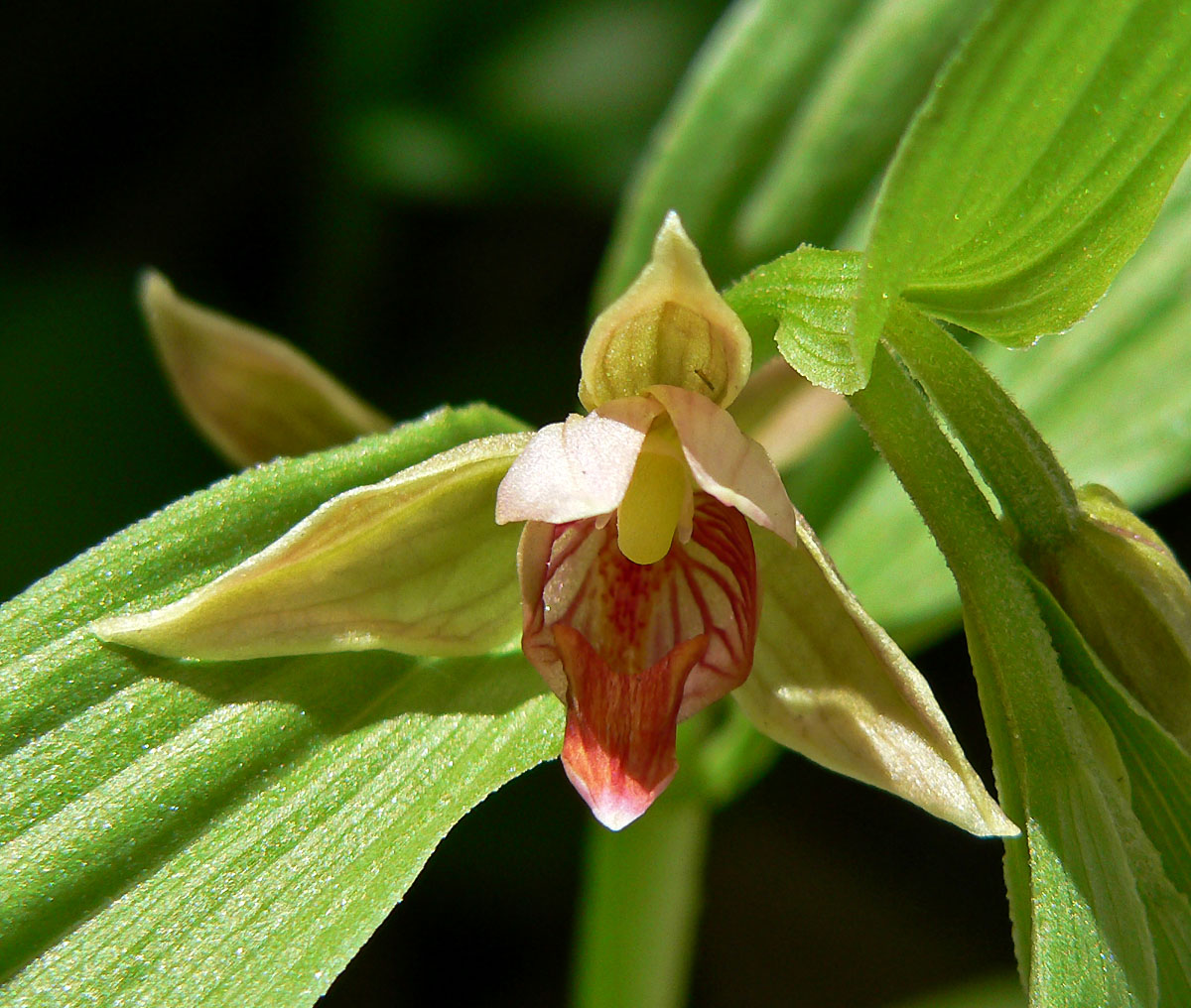
Giant helleborine

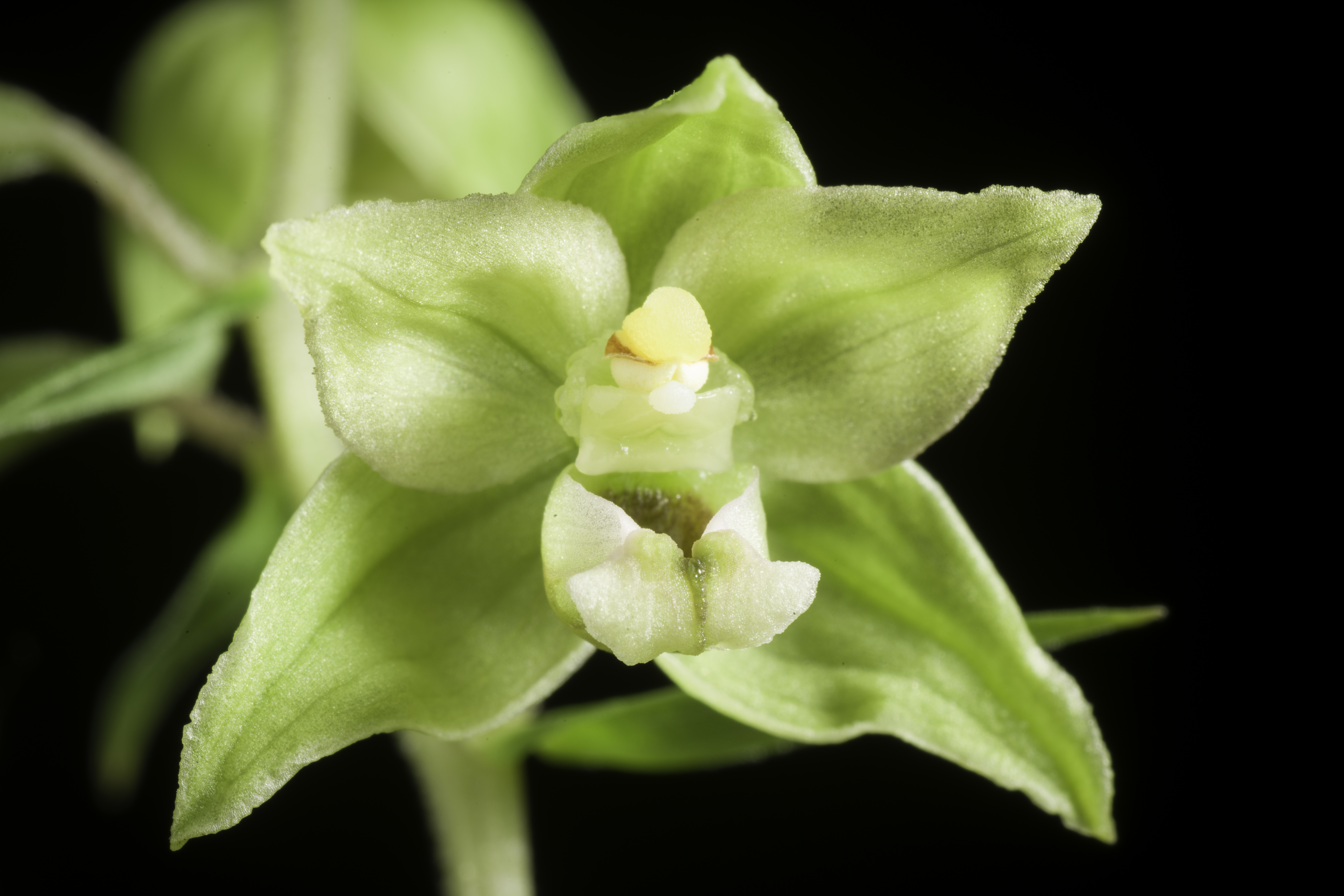
Epipactis papillosa

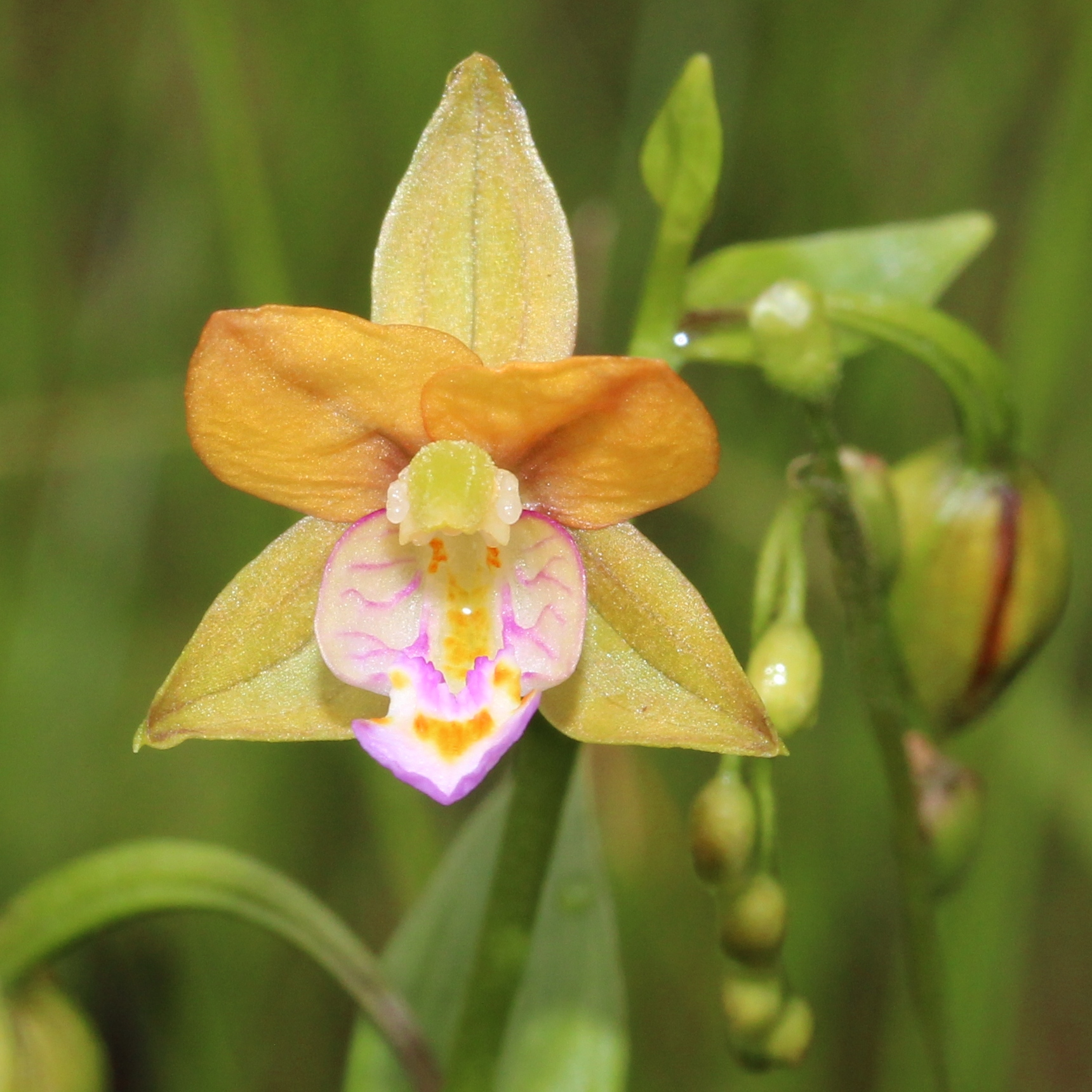
Epipactis thunbergii

There are 54 accepted species in the genus.

- Epipactis africana Rendle (Ethiopia to Malawi)
- Epipactis alata Aver. & Efimov
- Epipactis albensis Nováková & Rydlo (C. Europe)
- Epipactis ariosica V.A.Romano, S.Hertel & Presser
- Epipactis atrorubens (Hoffm.) Besser : dark red helleborine, royal helleborine (Europe to Caucasus)
- Epipactis bucegensis Anghelescu, L.Balogh & Mih.Balogh
- Epipactis bugacensis Robatsch (Hungary, near Bugacpusztaháza)
- Epipactis caramolica Presser & S.Hertel
- Epipactis condensata Boiss. ex D.P.Young (Turkey to Lebanon, Cyprus, W. Transcaucasus)
- Epipactis cordigera S.Hertel & Presser
- Epipactis cupaniana C.Brullo, D'Emerico & Pulv.
- Epipactis dunensis (T.Stephenson & T.A.Stephenson) Godfery (Great Britain: N. England to N. Wales)
- Epipactis euxina Fateryga, Popovich & Kreutz
- Epipactis fascicularis T.P.Lin
- Epipactis flaminia P.R.Savelli & Aless. (EC. Europe)
- Epipactis flava Seidenf. (Laos, Thailand)
- Epipactis garganica S.Hertel
- Epipactis gigantea Douglas : stream orchid, chatterbox, giant helleborine (W. Canada to N. Mexico)
- Epipactis greuteri H.Baumann & Künkele
- Epipactis guegelii Robatsch (Romania)
- Epipactis helleborine (L.) Crantz : broad-leaved helleborine (N. Africa, Europe to C. China, Type species)
- Epipactis humilior (Tang & F.T.Wang) S.C.Chen & G.H.Zhu
- Epipactis hyblaea Brullo & Zimmitti
- Epipactis hygrophila S.Hertel
- Epipactis ioessa Bongiorni, De Vivo, Fori & Romolini (Italy)
- Epipactis kartliana Kreutz & Van Domm.
- Epipactis kleinii M.B.Crespo & M.R.Lowe & Piera (S. France to E. Spain)
- Epipactis krymmontana Kreutz, Fateryga & Efimov
- Epipactis leptochila (Godfery) Godfery : narrow-lipped helleborine (Europe)
- Epipactis mairei Schltr.
- Epipactis majellensis Presser & S.Hertel
- Epipactis microphylla (Ehrh.) Sw. (Europe to Iran)
- Epipactis minipurpurata S.Hertel & Presser
- Epipactis muelleri Godfery (W. & C. Europe)
- Epipactis nasuta S.Hertel, Presser & Cicmir
- Epipactis odemensis Kreutz & Shifman
- Epipactis ohwii Fukuy. (C. Taiwan)
- Epipactis palustris (L.) Crantz : marsh helleborine, marsh orchid (Europe to Caucasus and Mongolia)
- Epipactis papillosa Franch. & Sav. (Russian Far East to Korea, Japan)
- Epipactis persica (Soó) Hausskn. ex Nannf. (SE. Europe to W. Pakistan)
- Epipactis phyllanthes G.E.Sm. : green-flowered helleborine (W. & NW. Europe)
- Epipactis pontica Taubenheim (EC. Europe to N. Turkey)
- Epipactis purpurata Sm.
- Epipactis rivularis Kranjcev & Cicmir
- Epipactis royleana Lindl. (E. Afghanistan to Himalaya)
- Epipactis stellifera Di Antonio & Veya (Switzerland)
- Epipactis thunbergii A.Gray (S. Russian Far East to Korea, Japan to Nansei-shoto)
- Epipactis torqueta Presser, S.Hertel & V.A.Romano
- Epipactis turcomanica K.P.Popov & Neshat. (C. Asia)
- Epipactis ulugurica Mansf. (Tanzania)
- Epipactis veluwensis Kreutz, H.Dekker, Bons & Löffler
- Epipactis veratrifolia Boiss. & Hohen. (Caucasus to Somalia and SC. China)
- Epipactis wartensteinii F.Fohringer
- Epipactis xanthophaea Schltr. (China)

There are also 22 known natural hybrids.

- Epipactis × barlae A.Camus
- Epipactis × barreana B.Baumann & H.Baumann
- Epipactis × breinerorum Batoušek
- Epipactis × bruxellensis P.Delforge
- Epipactis × cardonneae J.-M.Lewin
- Epipactis × conquensis Benito & C.E.Hermos.
- Epipactis × gerbaudiorum P.Delforge
- Epipactis × gevaudanii P.Delforge
- Epipactis × graberi A.Camus
- Epipactis × hanseniorum Batoušek
- Epipactis × heterogama M.Bayer
- Epipactis × liestalensis A.Camus
- Epipactis × mohilewiensis V.Lebedko & D.Dubovik
- Epipactis × nicolosii M.P.Grasso & Grillo
- Epipactis × pupplingensis K.P.Bell
- Epipactis × reinekei M.Bayer
- Epipactis × robatschii Gévaudan & P.Delforge
- Epipactis × schmalhausenii K.Richt.
- Epipactis × schulzei P.Fourn.
- Epipactis × stephensonii Godfery
- Epipactis × subtilis Jakubska-Busse, Zolubak & Lobas
- Epipactis × vermionensis B.Baumann & H.Baumann
