= Novopsocus =

Scientific classification
- Domain: Eukaryota
- Kingdom: Animalia
- Phylum: Arthropoda
- Class: Insecta
- Order: Psocodea
- Family: Pseudocaeciliidae
- Subfamily: Zelandopsocinae
- Genus: Novopsocus; Thornton, 1984

Species
- N. caeciliae N. magnus N. stenopterus

Genus of booklice

Novopsocus is a genus in the Pseudocaeciliidae family, with, until 2008, one described species endemic to New Guinea (described by Thornton. It was later found that the specimens of two different species (one of which undescribed) had been mixed, and an individual of a third species was found. The genus is characterised by a flat head with a sharp vertex, narrow, strap-like wings, and antennae with a broad, flattened first flagellar segment in the males of two species.

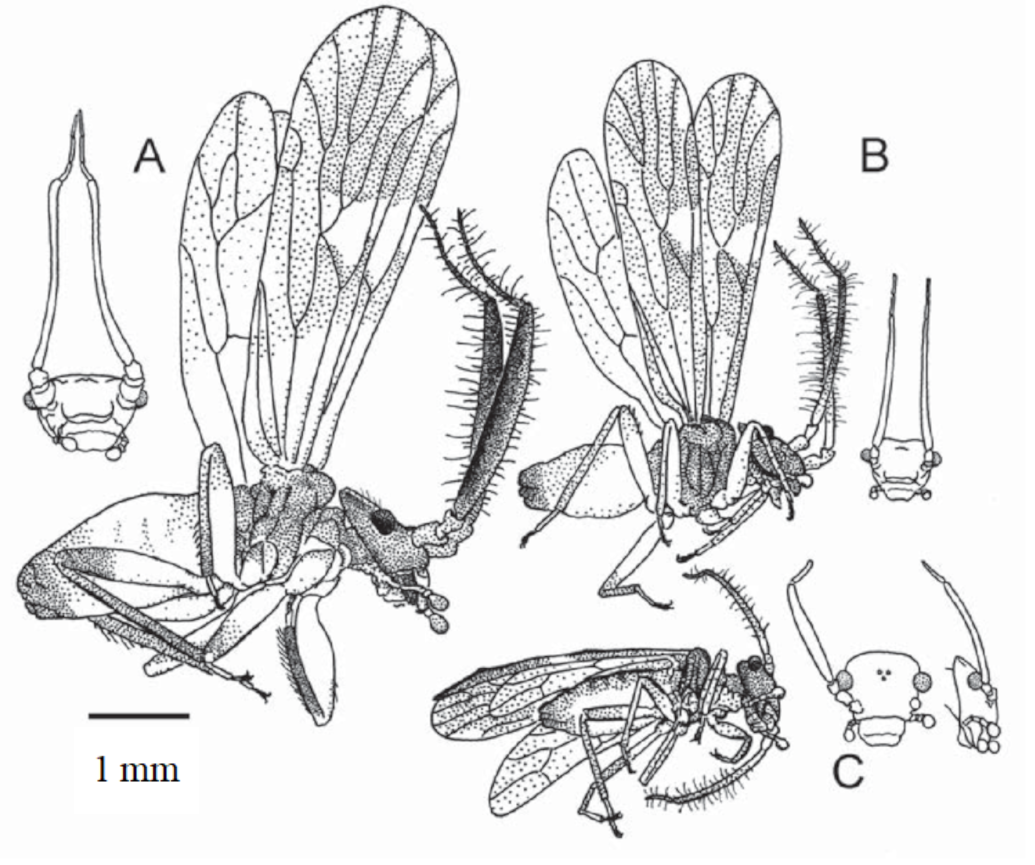
The three species of Novopsocus. A. N. magnus, B. N. stenopterus, C. N. caeciliae (from Cuénoud, 2008).
