= Novopsocus stenopterus =

Scientific classification
- Domain: Eukaryota
- Kingdom: Animalia
- Phylum: Arthropoda
- Class: Insecta
- Order: Psocodea
- Family: Pseudocaeciliidae
- Genus: Novopsocus
- Species: N. stenopterus

Binomial name
- Novopsocus stenopterus (Thornton & Smithers, 1977)

Species of booklouse

Novopsocus stenopterus is a Psocoptera species found in New Guinea. It is the type species of its genus, characterised by similar sexes, the males having antennae similar to those of females. There are two other species of Novopsocus.
