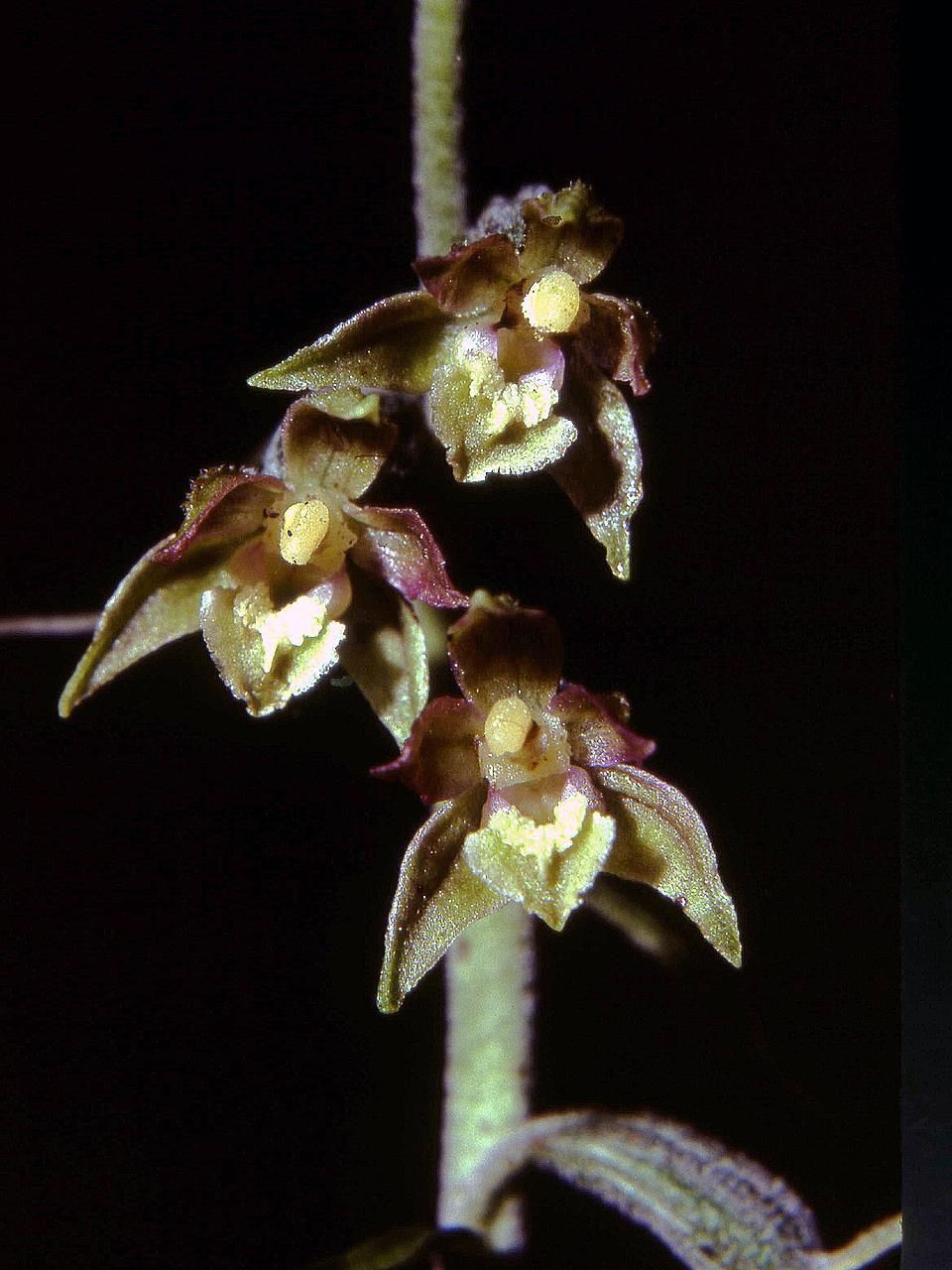

Scientific classification
- Kingdom: Plantae
- Clade: Tracheophytes
- Clade: Angiosperms
- Clade: Monocots
- Order: Asparagales
- Family: Orchidaceae
- Subfamily: Epidendroideae
- Genus: Epipactis
- Species: E. microphylla

Binomial name
- Epipactis microphylla (Ehrh.) Sw.

Synonyms
- Serapias microphylla Ehrh. (Basionym); Serapias latifolia var. parvifolia Pers.; Epipactis athensis Lej.; Serapias athensis (Lej.) Hocq.; Epipactis atrorubens Rostk. ex Spreng.; Epipactis intermedia Schur; Limodorum microphyllum (Ehrh.) Kuntze; Helleborine microphylla (Ehrh.) Schinz & Thell.; Amesia microphylla (Ehrh.) A. Nelson & J.F. Macbr.

= Epipactis microphylla =

Species of orchid

Epipactis microphylla, the small-leaved helleborine, is a species of orchid. It is native to much of Europe and to Southwest Asia as far east as Iran though noticeably absent from the British Isles and from Scandinavia. It has also been found in North Africa, in the Babor mountains in Little Kabylia, Algeria.
