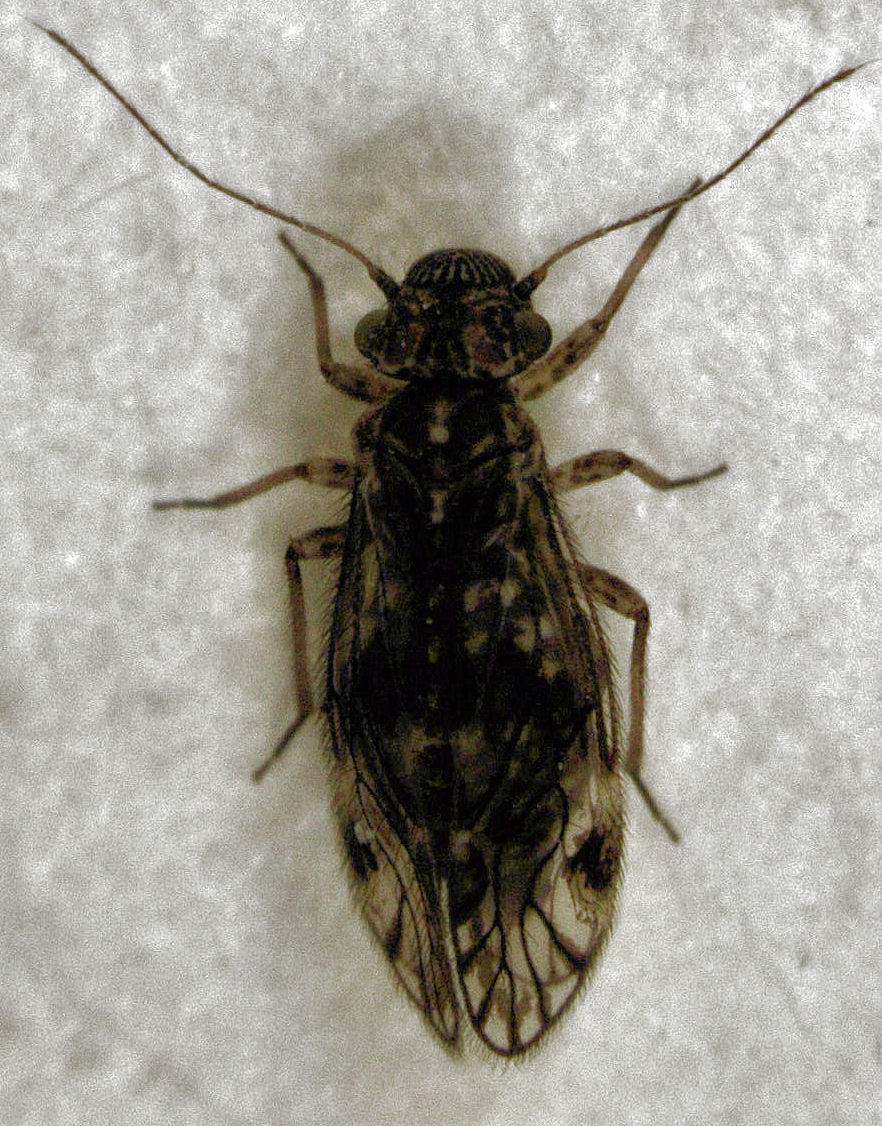
- Philotarsopsis guttata

Scientific classification
- Kingdom: Animalia
- Phylum: Arthropoda
- Clade: Pancrustacea
- Class: Insecta
- Order: Psocodea
- Suborder: Psocomorpha
- Infraorder: Philotarsetae
- Family: Philotarsidae

Genera
- Subfamily Philotarsinae: Haplophalus; Philotarsus; Subfamily Aaroniellinae: Aaroniella; Philotarsopsis; Tarsophilus

= Philotarsidae =

Family of booklice

Philotarsidae is a family of Psocodea (formerly Psocoptera) belonging to the suborder Psocomorpha. The family is closely related to the family Pseudocaeciliidae, both within the infraorder Philotarsetae.

It includes the following genera:

- Aaroniella Mockford, 1951
- Abelopsocus Schmidt & New, 2008
- Garcialdretia Mockford, 2007
- Haplophallus Thornton, 1959
- Nocopsocus Thornton, 1984
- Philotarsopsis Tillyard, 1923
- Philotarsus Kolbe, 1880
- Tarsophilus Mockford & Broadhead, 1982

== Sources ==
- Lienhard, C. & Smithers, C. N. 2002. Psocoptera (Insecta): World Catalogue and Bibliography. Instrumenta Biodiversitatis, vol. 5. Muséum d'histoire naturelle, Genève.
