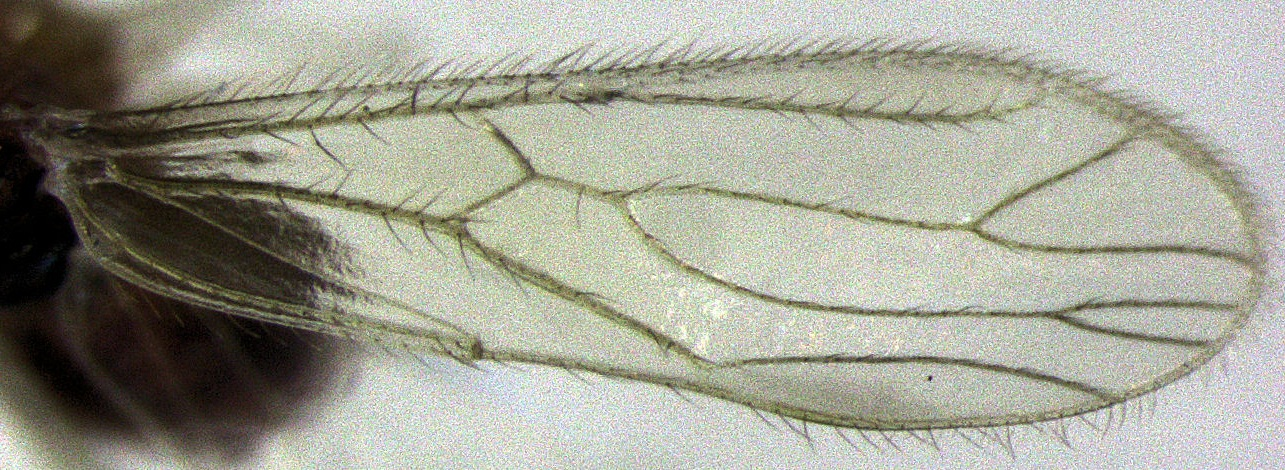
- Mepleres watti forewing

Scientific classification
- Kingdom: Animalia
- Phylum: Arthropoda
- Clade: Pancrustacea
- Class: Insecta
- Order: Psocodea
- Suborder: Psocomorpha
- Infraorder: Philotarsetae
- Family: Pseudocaeciliidae; Pearman, 1936

Genera
- Subfamily Zelandopsocinae: Austropsocus; Novopsocus; Zelandopsocus; Subfamily Pseudocaeciliinae: Allocaecilius; Allopsocus; Chorocaecilius; Cladioneura; Diplocaecilius; Heterocaecilius; Levucaecilius; Lobocaecilius; Mepleres; Mesocaecilius; Ophiodopelma; Phallocaecilius; Pseudocaecilius; Scottiella; Scytopsocopsis; Scytopsocus; Trichocaecilius; Trimerocaecilius

Synonyms
- Calopsocidae Pearman, 1936

= Pseudocaeciliidae =

Family of booklice

Pseudocaeciliidae is a family of Psocodea (formerly Psocoptera) belonging to the suborder Psocomorpha. The name stems from a superficial resemblance to the distantly related family Caeciliusidae (formerly Caeciliidae). The family is closely related to the family Philotarsidae, both within the infraorder Philotarsetae.

== Sources ==
- Lienhard, C. & Smithers, C. N. 2002. Psocoptera (Insecta): World Catalogue and Bibliography. Instrumenta Biodiversitatis, vol. 5. Muséum d'histoire naturelle, Genève.
