= List of ant-mimicking spiders of Sri Lanka =

Sri Lanka is a tropical island situated close to the southern tip of India. The invertebrate fauna is as large as it is common to other regions of the world. There are about 2 million species of arthropods found in the world, and still it is counting. So many new species are discover up to this time also. So it is very complicated and difficult to summarize the exact number of species found within a certain region.

The following list provide the antmimicking spiders in Sri Lanka.

== Ant-mimics ==
Phylum: Arthropoda
Class: Arachnida
Order: Araneae
Family: Salticidae

Jumping spiders, where the members of family Salticidae are commonly called, has the best vision among spiders and use it in courtship, hunting, and navigation. Although they normally move unobtrusively and fairly slowly, most species are capable of very agile jumps, notably when hunting, but sometimes in response to sudden threats or crossing long gaps. The species within genus Myrmarachne are called ant-mimicking spiders, where they closely resemble ants, by morphology and behavior.

Sri Lanka comprised 11 ant-mimicking spiders and three of them are discovered in 2015 by professor Suresh Benjamin, associate Research Professor of the Department of Ecology and Environmental Biology, National Institute of Fundamental Studies, Kandy and revealed to the world through Journal of Natural History on 12 May 2015. Six of them are endemic to Sri Lanka.

| Binomial | taxon author | Distribution in island |
|---|---|---|
| Myrmarachne bicurvata | (O. Pickard-Cambridge, 1869) | |
| Myrmarachne dishani | Benjamin, 2015 | Sinharaja rainforest |
| Myrmarachne imbellis | (Peckham & Peckham, 1892) | |
| Myrmarachne morningside | Benjamin, 2015 | Morningside forest cover |
| Myrmarachne plataleoides | (O. Pickard-Cambridge, 1869) | |
| Myrmarachne prava | (Karsch, 1880) | |
| Myrmarachne melanocephala | (Peckham and Peckham, 1892) | |
| Myrmarachne ramunni | Narayan, 1915 | |
| Myrmarachne spissa | (Peckham & Peckham, 1892) | |
| Myrmarachne uniseriata | Narayan, 1915 | Kurunegala district |
| Panachraesta paludosa | (Simon, 1900) | |
