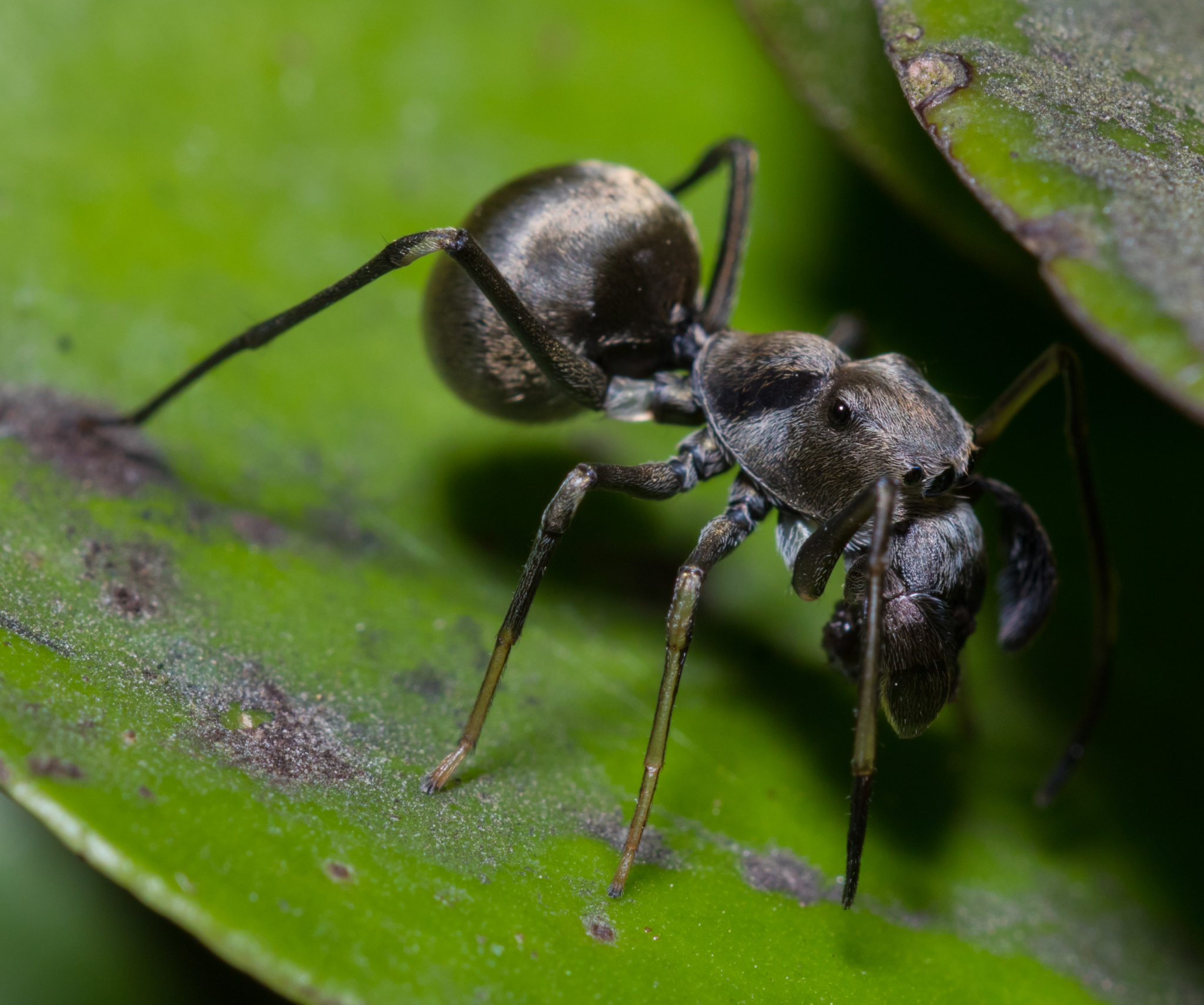
- T. globosus from Hong Kong

Scientific classification
- Kingdom: Animalia
- Phylum: Arthropoda
- Subphylum: Chelicerata
- Class: Arachnida
- Order: Araneae
- Infraorder: Araneomorphae
- Family: Salticidae
- Genus: Toxeus
- Species: T. globosus

Binomial name
- Toxeus globosus (Wanless, 1978)

Synonyms
- Myrmarachne globosa Wanless, 1978; Myrmavola globosa Prószyński, 2016

= Toxeus globosus =

Species of spider

Toxeus globosus is a species of jumping spider in the genus Toxeus. It is distributed across several regions including Angola, China, the Democratic Republic of the Congo, and Vietnam.

== Etymology ==
The specific epithet globosus means "globe-shaped" or "spherical" in Latin, referring to the form of the spermathecae.

== Taxonomy ==
The species was originally described as Myrmarachne globosa by Fred R. Wanless in 1978. It was subsequently transferred to the genus Myrmavola by Jerzy Prószyński in 2016, and later to Toxeus by the same author in 2017.

== Distribution ==
T. globosus has been recorded from several locations across its range. The holotype was collected from the environs of Dundo in Angola. In China, the species has been documented from Hunan Province (including Zhangjiajie and Yandi) and Yunnan Province. Additional records exist from the Democratic Republic of the Congo and Vietnam.

== Description ==
=== Males ===
Male specimens have a total body length of 6.50–6.70 mm. In the specimen measuring 6.50 mm, the carapace length is 2.35 mm, the cephalothorax length is 3.20 mm with a width of 1.91 mm, and the opisthosoma length is 2.90 mm with a width of 1.85 mm.

The body is cylindrical and stout with a brown to reddish-brown coloration covered in short greyish-white hairs. The eye region is surrounded by dark brown, with the anterior eyes encircled by longer white hairs. The posterior lateral eyes are positioned at the highest point of the cephalothorax and project laterally. The carapace is yellowish-brown, flattened anteriorly and narrower posteriorly.

The chelicerae are robust with short white hairs on the dorsal and lateral surfaces, while the inner surface is broad and flattened. From the dorsal view, one large tooth and one small tooth can be seen on each side (totaling 2 teeth), while from the inner surface view, the front margin has 7 teeth and the rear margin has 2 small teeth. The pedipalps are brush-like, reddish-brown to yellowish-brown in color, approximately 4 times the width length. The lower lip is deep reddish-brown, approximately 2 times the width length, with both sides of the middle section curved inward.

The legs are slender and reddish-brown in color. The first leg segments including the trochanter are yellow, as are the trochanter and knee segments of the fourth leg. The leg segments have an enlarged base. The opisthosoma is nearly spherical, reddish-brown to greyish-brown, and covered with short hairs. The ventral surface shows 2 yellowish-brown longitudinal bands in front of the spinnerets, with the spinnerets being brownish or greyish-brown in color.

=== Females ===
Female specimens are larger, measuring 6.80–8.40 mm in total body length. In a specimen measuring 6.80 mm, the carapace length is 1.70 mm, cephalothorax length is 3.40 mm with width 1.98 mm, and abdomen length is 3.10 mm with width 2.24 mm.

Females are morphologically similar to males but with shorter chelicerae. The front margin has 7 teeth with 5 larger, equally-spaced central teeth, while the smaller teeth are located at both ends. The rear margin has 13-15 densely arranged teeth of varying sizes, with both front and rear teeth bearing brownish long hairs. The first leg segments including trochanter and patella are yellowish-brown with brownish longitudinal stripes.
