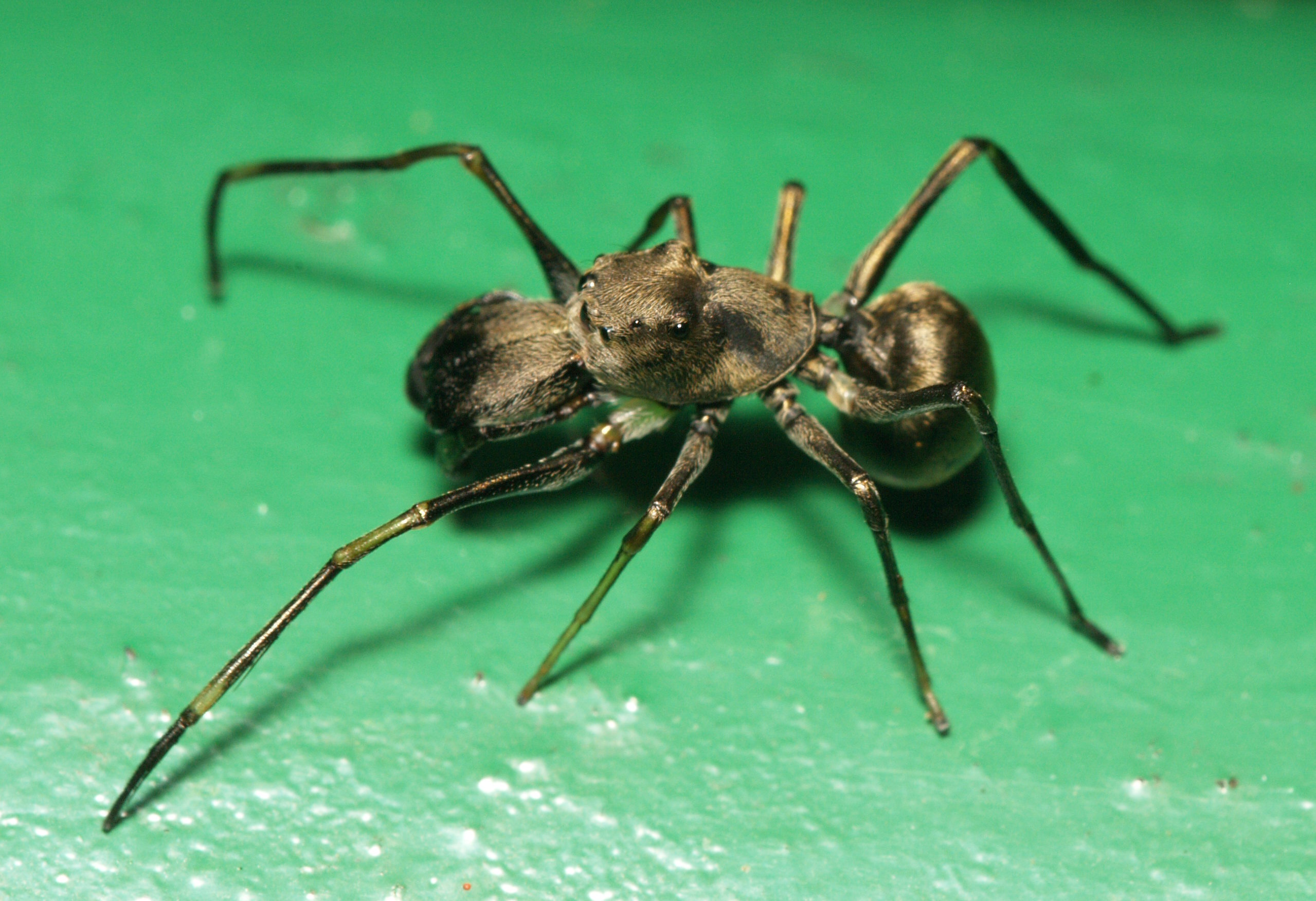
- Male

Scientific classification
- Kingdom: Animalia
- Phylum: Arthropoda
- Subphylum: Chelicerata
- Class: Arachnida
- Order: Araneae
- Infraorder: Araneomorphae
- Family: Salticidae
- Genus: Toxeus
- Species: T. magnus

Binomial name
- Toxeus magnus (Saito, 1933)

Synonyms
- Myrmarachne magna (Saito, 1933)

= Toxeus magnus =

Species of spider

Toxeus magnus is a species of jumping spider of the genus Toxeus. It is endemic to Taiwan and Southeast Asia. The species was originally classified as a part of the genus Myrmarachne in 1933 by Saitō in his work Notes on the spiders from Formosa, but it was later reclassified as Toxeus by the Polish arachnologist Jerzy Prószyński in November 2016. The species is notable for being a non-mammalian animal that nurses its offspring through a form of lactation.

Toxeus magnus is exceptional because of its social behaviour. Of the more than 54,000 known different species of spiders only around 120 are known to be able to tolerate the company of others (including their own siblings) for more than three weeks, and only around 30 species of spiders are known to engage in life-long social lives.

== Lactation ==
Toxeus magnus nurses its offspring for about 38 days, although they are able to forage on their own after 21 days. While the species was first classified in 1933, it was not until 2012 that Chinese researcher Chen Zhanqi at the Chinese Academy of Sciences in Menglunzhen, Yunnan had noticed that the Toxeus magnus shared a nest and in July 2017 he had discovered their nursing behaviour. The white milk-like nutritional fluids produced by the female Toxeus magnus contains sugar, fat, and protein. There is about 2 milligrams of sugar, 5 milligrams of fat, and 124 milligrams of protein in every milliliter of this fluid. While this fluid is not technically a type of "milk" (containing lactose produced by mammary glands) it does fulfill the same purpose as milk does in mammals and it contains four times more protein relative to cow's milk.

Researchers attempted to discover how long the Toxeus magnus spiderlings can survive without their mother's "milk" by glueing her epigastric furrow shut. Blocking nursing immediately after birth resulted in complete mortality of the offspring, whereas blocking it 20 days after birth resulted in increased foraging and reduced survival. Even after the spiderlings started hunting themselves blocking them from their mother's "milk" decreased their chances of survival by about 50%.

For around the first week after the eggs hatch, a Toxeus magnus mother will leave "milk" droplets around her nest to be consumed by her offspring, after this initial period the mother will start to directly nurse her offspring. While the mother might occasionally hunt for fruit flies and other small insects to eat herself, they are not known to return prey back to the nest for feeding their offspring and it is believed that baby Toxeus magnus exclusively feed on the milk-like substance produced by their mothers for the first three weeks of their lives before they start foraging themselves. After reaching sexual maturity, daughters (but not sons) are allowed to continue, while at this stage in their lives the continued consumption of this milk-like fluid is not exclusively necessary for survival. The offspring that consume it have higher chances of survival, since foraging outside their nest would increase the risk of predation.

This form of lactation may have evolved from production of trophic eggs.

== See also ==
- Crop milk

== Sources ==
- Prószyński, J. (2016). Delimitation and description of 19 new genera, a subgenus and a species of Salticidae (Araneae) of the world. - Ecologica Montenegrina 7: 4-32.
- Saitō, S. (1933b). Notes on the spiders from Formosa. Transactions of the Sapporo Natural History Society 13 (1): 32–60, pl. 3.
