= Bocusoides =

Scientific classification
- Kingdom: Animalia
- Phylum: Arthropoda
- Subphylum: Chelicerata
- Class: Arachnida
- Order: Araneae
- Infraorder: Araneomorphae
- Family: Salticidae
- Genus: Bocusoides; Wang & Li, 2022
- Species: B. zhaoi

Binomial name
- Bocusoides zhaoi Wang & Li, 2022

Species of spider

Bocusoides is a monotypic genus of ant-mimicking spiders in the family Salticidae containing the single species, Bocusoides zhaoi.

== Distribution ==
Bocusoides zhaoi is endemic to Xishuangbanna, Yunnan, China.

== Etymology ==
The genus name is a combination of related genus Bocus and "-oides", indicating its similarity. The species name honors Qingyuan Zhao, who collected the species.
