= Myrmarachne exasperans =

Scientific classification
- Kingdom: Animalia
- Phylum: Arthropoda
- Subphylum: Chelicerata
- Class: Arachnida
- Order: Araneae
- Infraorder: Araneomorphae
- Family: Salticidae
- Genus: Myrmarachne
- Species: M. exasperans

Binomial name
- Myrmarachne exasperans (Peckham & Peckham, 1892)

Species of spider

Myrmarachne exasperans is a species of jumping spider found in southeast Asia. The species which was originally described in Java has also been recorded in Borneo, Palawan (Philippines) Vietnam and Bali, where the largest number of individuals have been recorded.

== Mimicry ==
While most species in the genus Myrmarachne mimic ants, M. exasperans is believed to mimic a species of ichneumonid wasp of the genus Goryphus (possibly Goryphus basilaris). Myrmarachne exasperans mimics the ichneumonid wasp in both appearance and behaviour, flicking its front legs and abdomen up and down to mimic the movement of the wasps antennae and wings.

== Nest ==
Myrmarachne exasperans nests can be found under medium and large leaves, particularly Heliconia, Ficus, Asplenium nidus and Hibiscus. Unlike nests built by other species of Myrmarachne that comprise solely of silk, M. exasperans decorates the outer layer of its nest with detritus.
