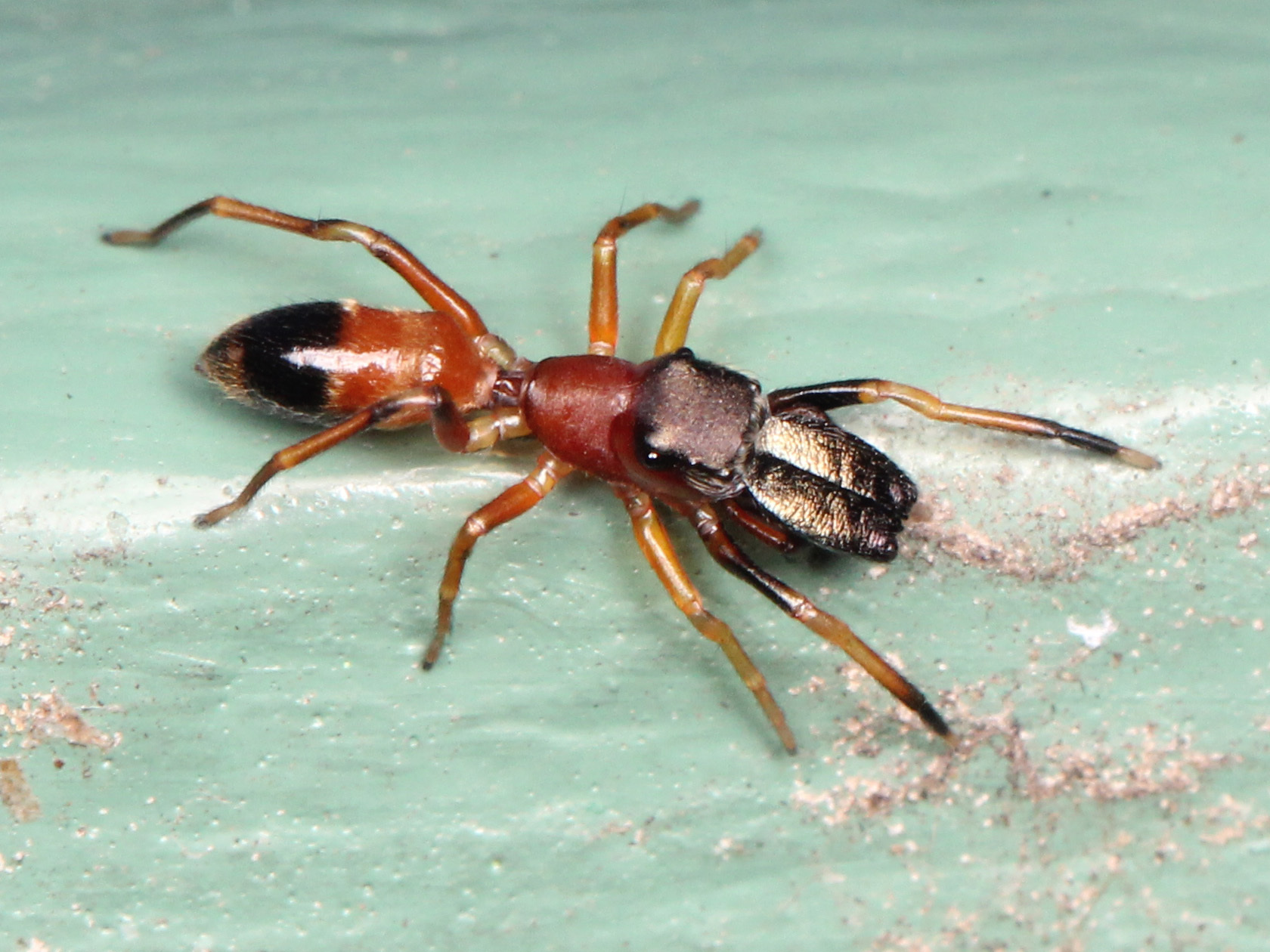
- Male
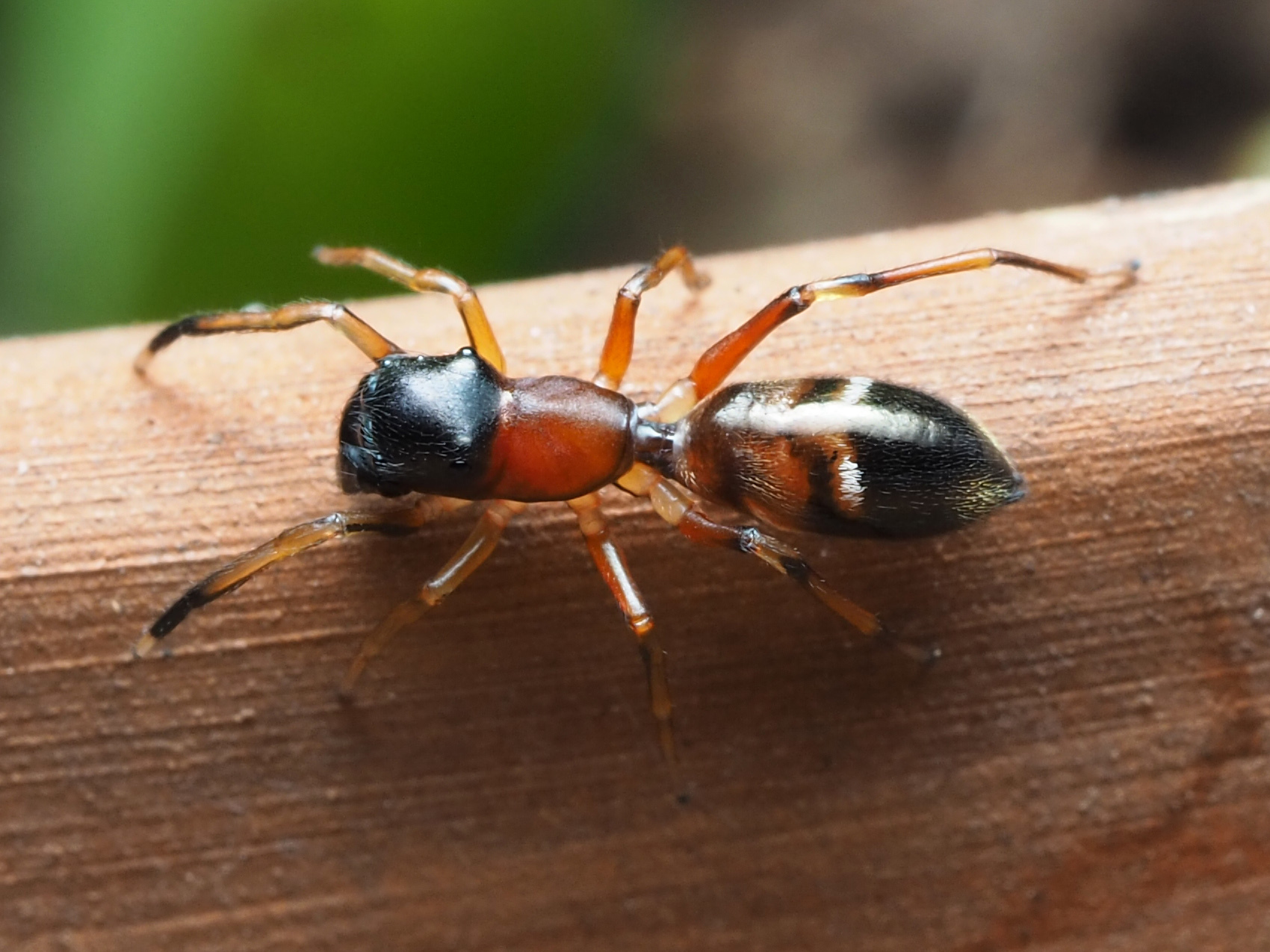
- Female

Scientific classification
- Kingdom: Animalia
- Phylum: Arthropoda
- Subphylum: Chelicerata
- Class: Arachnida
- Order: Araneae
- Infraorder: Araneomorphae
- Family: Salticidae
- Genus: Myrmarachne
- Species: M. formicaria

Binomial name
- Myrmarachne formicaria (de Geer, 1778)

Synonyms
- Aranea joblotii Aranea formicaria Attus formicarius Attus formicoides Salticus formicarius Pyrophorus semirufus Pyrophorus helveticus Pyrophorus siciliensis Attus helveticus Pyrophorus austriacus Saltica formicaria Pyrophorus venetiarum Pyrophorus flaviventris Pyroderes formicarius Pyroderes helveticus Pyroderes semirufus Pyroderes venetiarum Pyroderes flaviventris Toxeus formicarius Myrmarachne jobloti Myrmarachne joblotii

= Myrmarachne formicaria =

Species of spider

Myrmarachne formicaria is a species of jumping spider (family Salticidae). It mimics an ant. It is one of the few species in the genus Myrmarachne that is found outside the tropics.

== Name ==
The species name formicaria means "ant-like" in Latin coming from combining the Latin noun "formica" which means ant and the Latin suffix "-aria" which is commonly used in scientific naming conventions to denote biological genera and groups.

== Distribution ==
M. formicaria has a palearctic distribution and has been introduced to the United States. It was first recorded in the United States on 16 August 2001 in Trumbull County, Ohio. Since then, it has spread to Pennsylvania and New York.
