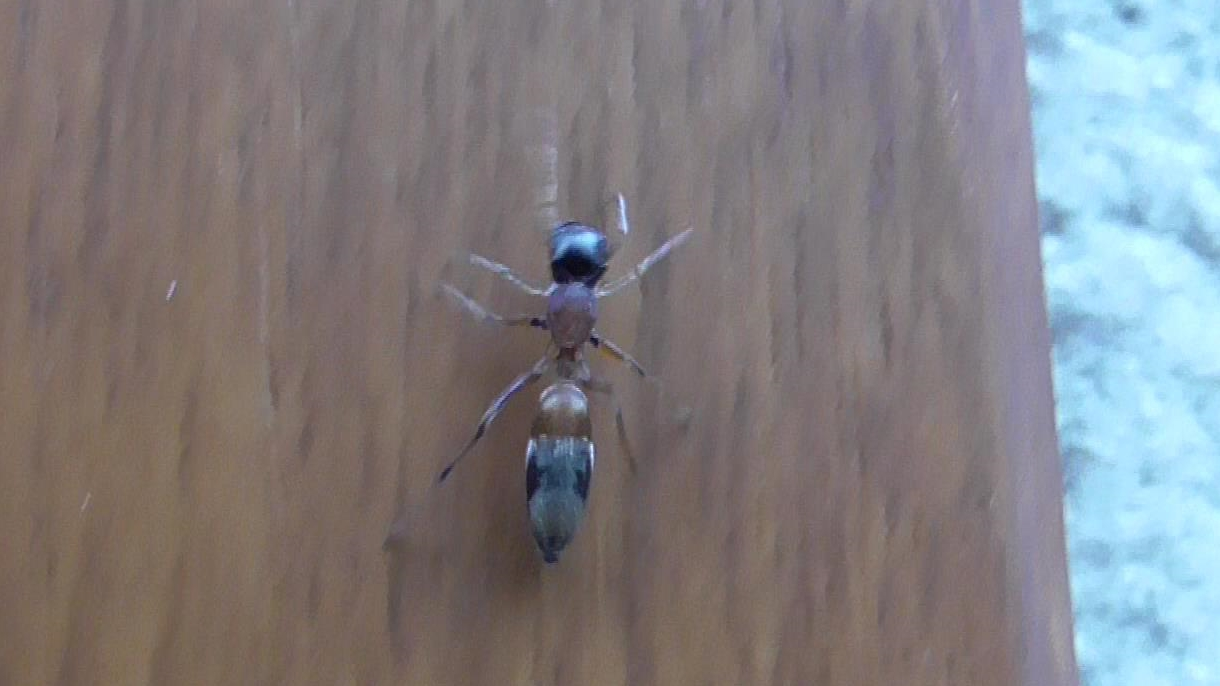
- In Japan

Scientific classification
- Kingdom: Animalia
- Phylum: Arthropoda
- Subphylum: Chelicerata
- Class: Arachnida
- Order: Araneae
- Infraorder: Araneomorphae
- Family: Salticidae
- Genus: Myrmarachne
- Species: M. elongata

Binomial name
- Myrmarachne elongata Szombathy, 1915

Synonyms
- Myrmarachne coppeti Berland & Millot, 1941; Myrmarachne faradjensis Roewer, 1965; Myrmarachne atra Roewer, 1965; Myrmarachne abimvai Roewer, 1965; Myrmarachne dartevellei Roewer, 1965; Myrmarachne kasaia Roewer, 1965; Myrmarachne moto Roewer, 1965

= Myrmarachne elongata =

Species of spider

Myrmarachne elongata is a species of jumping spider (family Salticidae) that mimics an ant.

== Distribution ==
The World Spider Catalog gives the distribution of Myrmarachne elongata as from Africa to Japan. Wesolowska and Russell-Smith suggest that records outside Africa may be mis-identifications.
