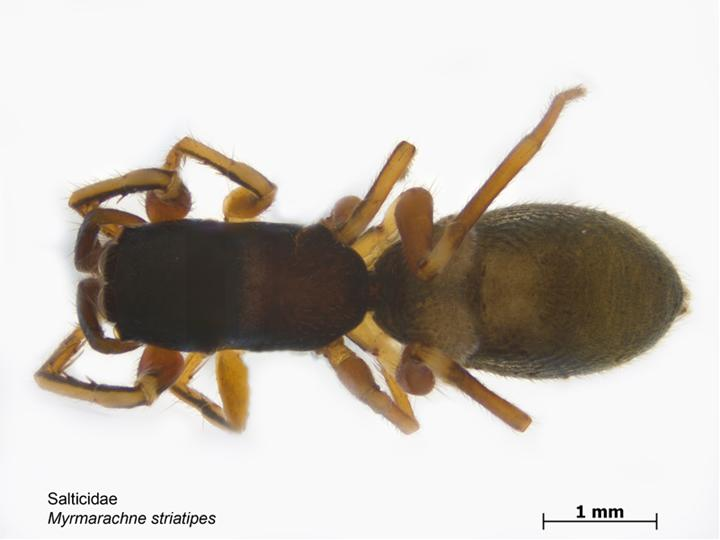

Scientific classification
- Kingdom: Animalia
- Phylum: Arthropoda
- Subphylum: Chelicerata
- Class: Arachnida
- Order: Araneae
- Infraorder: Araneomorphae
- Family: Salticidae
- Genus: Myrmarachne
- Species: M. striatipes

Binomial name
- Myrmarachne striatipes (L. Koch, 1879)

Synonyms
- Leptorchestes striatipes

= Myrmarachne striatipes =

Species of spider

Myrmarachne striatipes is a jumping spider that mimics an ant. Its body length is around eight millimeters.

== Name ==
The species name is derived from Latin striatipes "striped foot".

== Distribution ==
Myrmarachne striatipes is known from Queensland and New South Wales.
