= Panachraesta =

Scientific classification
- Kingdom: Animalia
- Phylum: Arthropoda
- Subphylum: Chelicerata
- Class: Arachnida
- Order: Araneae
- Infraorder: Araneomorphae
- Family: Salticidae
- Subfamily: Salticinae
- Genus: Panachraesta; Simon, 1900
- Species: P. paludosa

Binomial name
- Panachraesta paludosa (Simon, 1900)

Genus of spiders

Panachraesta is a monotypic genus of Sri Lankan jumping spiders containing the single species, Panachraesta paludosa. It was first described by Eugène Louis Simon in 1900, and is only found in Sri Lanka. Until 2016, it was a synonym of Myrmarachne.

Jerzy Prószyński considered that there was confusion over the identity of specimens described as Panachraesta paludosa so the transfer to Myrmarachne should be rejected. There was some resemblance to the genus Toxeus. The species did appear to be part of Prószyński's informal group "myrmarachnines". Myrmarachne is placed in tribe Myrmarachnini, part of the Salticoida clade of the subfamily Salticinae.
