= Myrmarachne morningside =

Scientific classification
- Kingdom: Animalia
- Phylum: Arthropoda
- Subphylum: Chelicerata
- Class: Arachnida
- Order: Araneae
- Infraorder: Araneomorphae
- Family: Salticidae
- Genus: Myrmarachne
- Species: M. morningside

Binomial name
- Myrmarachne morningside Benjamin, 2015

Species of spider

Myrmarachne morningside, is a species of spider of the genus Myrmarachne. It is endemic to Sri Lanka. The species was first found from Eastern part of morningside section of Sinharaja Forest Reserve. The species can easily identified by mostly shiny surfaces on distal parts of prosoma. The species is sometimes confused with Myrmarachne spissa, only can be carefully separated from a disk-shaped tegulum.
