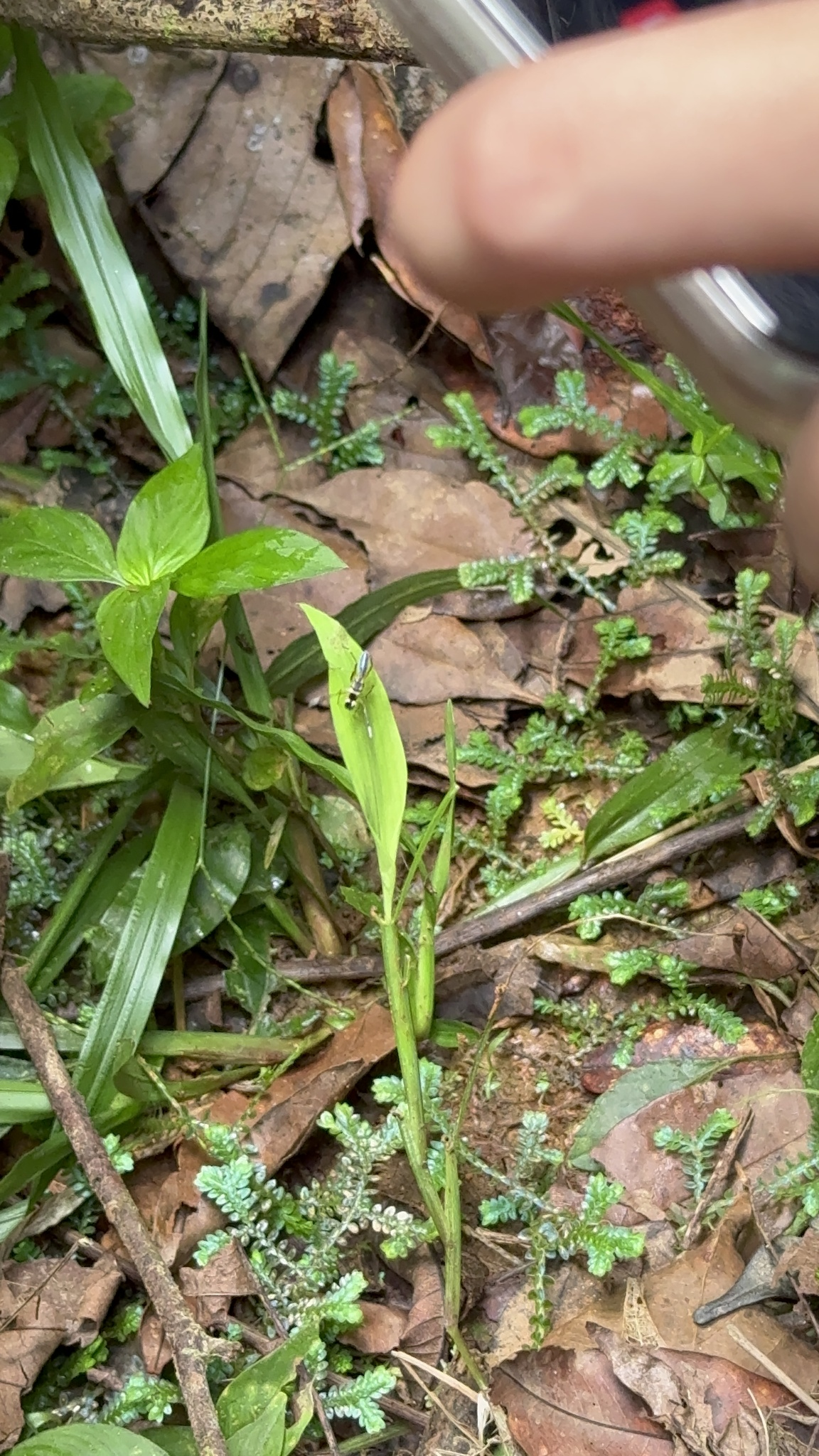

Scientific classification
- Kingdom: Animalia
- Phylum: Arthropoda
- Subphylum: Chelicerata
- Class: Arachnida
- Order: Araneae
- Infraorder: Araneomorphae
- Family: Salticidae
- Genus: Myrmage
- Species: M. dishani

Binomial name
- Myrmage dishani (Benjamin, 2015)

Synonyms
- Myrmarachne dishani Benjamin, 2015

= Myrmage dishani =

Species of spider

Myrmage dishani is a species of jumping spider in the family Salticidae. It is endemic to Sri Lanka. The species was first found from the eastern part of Sinharaja Forest Reserve and can easily be identified by the round opisthosoma without any visible constrict. The species is similar to Myrmage imbellis.
