= Myrmarachne melanotarsa =

Scientific classification
- Kingdom: Animalia
- Phylum: Arthropoda
- Subphylum: Chelicerata
- Class: Arachnida
- Order: Araneae
- Infraorder: Araneomorphae
- Family: Salticidae
- Genus: Myrmarachne
- Species: M. melanotarsa

Binomial name
- Myrmarachne melanotarsa (Wesolowska & Salm, 2002)

Species of spider

Myrmarachne melanotarsa, the dark-footed ant-spider, is an African jumping spider found around Lake Victoria in Africa. Like other spiders in the genus Myrmarachne, these spiders mimic ants, in this case, ants of the genus Crematogaster. However, they are unusual in that they exhibit some form of social behavior, forming clusters of silk nests on fig and other trees. Hundreds of these spiders, of both sexes and of all ages, can be found in such communal nests, but most nests have between 10 and 50 spiders. The Crematogaster ants which they mimic are often found in the nests with the spiders, along with other species of jumping spider.

Some predators (including larger jumping spiders) eat jumping spiders but are averse to attacking ants, as ants aggressively defend themselves. M. melanotarsa takes advantage of this aversion by mimicking the ants. Spiders of the genera Menemerus and Pseudicius have been shown to flee, leaving their eggs behind, when in the presence of groups of M. melanotarsa. M. melanotarsa is known to eat the eggs of such spiders. However, individuals or small groups of M. melanotarsa may be attacked and eaten by these predators who fear large groups.
