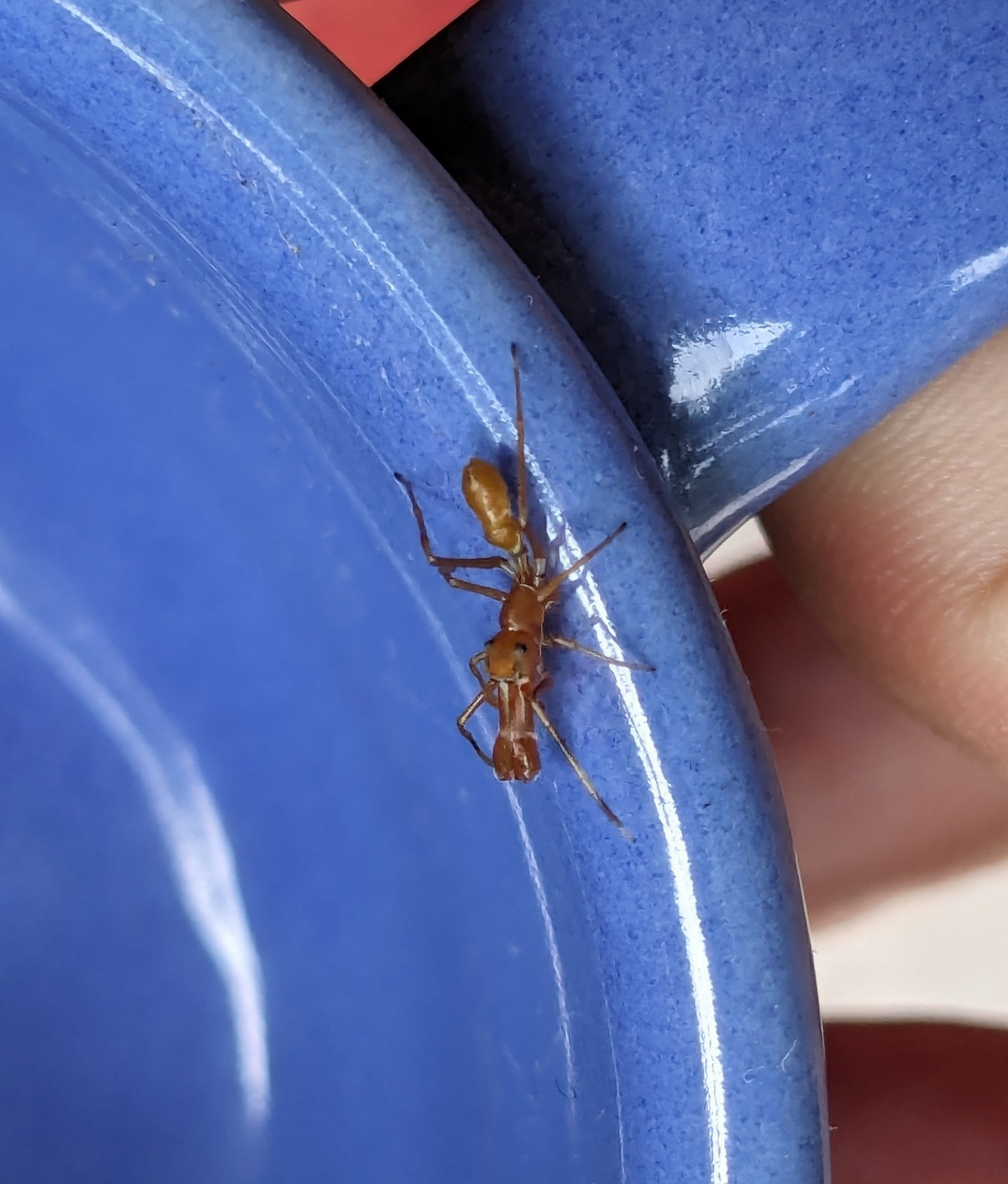
- male from Bali

Scientific classification
- Kingdom: Animalia
- Phylum: Arthropoda
- Subphylum: Chelicerata
- Class: Arachnida
- Order: Araneae
- Infraorder: Araneomorphae
- Family: Salticidae
- Genus: Myrmarachne
- Species: M. clavigera

Binomial name
- Myrmarachne clavigera (Thorell, 1877)

Synonyms
- Synemosyna clavigera Thorell, 1877

= Myrmarachne clavigera =

Species of spider

Myrmarachne clavigera is a species of ant-mimicking jumping spider in the family Salticidae. It is endemic to Indonesia.

The species name clavigera (club bearer, from Latin clava "club" and gerere "to carry") refers to the large chelicerae in males.

== Taxonomy ==
The species was originally described by Tamerlan Thorell in 1877 as Synemosyna clavigera based on a male specimen collected from Kendari, Sulawesi. It was later transferred to the genus Myrmarachne by Eugène Simon in 1901.

== Distribution ==
M. clavigera is known only from Indonesia. The holotype was collected from Kendari (now Kendari) in Sulawesi.

== Description ==
The male of M. clavigera is characterized by its remarkably long chelicerae, which exceed the length of the carapace. It has a distinctive cheliceral armature with eleven teeth along the front edge (prolateral) and four teeth along the rear edge (retrolateral). Particularly notable is the third tooth from the tip on the front edge, which is remarkably large, and the first rear tooth, which is unusually long.

The carapace measures about 2.23 mm in length and 1.40 mm in width, with the chelicerae reaching 3.00 mm in length. The body coloration is brown to dark brown, with the carapace having sparse fine hairs and distinctive white lateral markings between the head and thorax regions. The abdomen is slender and oval-shaped with two brown dorsal plates (scuta) that appear slightly glossy under magnification.

The female of this species has not been formally described.
