= Myrmage =

Scientific classification
- Kingdom: Animalia
- Phylum: Arthropoda
- Subphylum: Chelicerata
- Class: Arachnida
- Order: Araneae
- Infraorder: Araneomorphae
- Family: Salticidae
- Subfamily: Salticinae
- Genus: Myrmage; Prószyński, 2016

Type species
- Myrmage gedongensis

Species
- Myrmage dishani (Benjamin, 2015); Myrmage gedongensis (Badcock, 1918); Myrmage imbellis (Peckham & Peckham, 1892)

Genus of spiders

Myrmage is a genus of spiders in the family Salticidae. It was first described in 2016 by Prószyński. As of 2017, it contains 3 Asian species.
