= Emertonius =

Scientific classification
- Kingdom: Animalia
- Phylum: Arthropoda
- Subphylum: Chelicerata
- Class: Arachnida
- Order: Araneae
- Infraorder: Araneomorphae
- Family: Salticidae
- Subfamily: Salticinae
- Genus: Emertonius; Peckham & Peckham, 1892

Species
- See text.

Genus of spiders

Emertonius is a genus of spiders in the jumping spider family Salticidae.

== Taxonomy ==
Emertonius was first described by George and Elizabeth Peckham in 1892. It was variously treated as a synonym of Myrmarachne or a separate genus from 1978 onwards. Jerzy Prószyński revalidated the genus in 2018, and it is accepted by the World Spider Catalog as of August 2020.

When included in Myrmarachne, it was placed in subfamily Salticinae (clade Salticoida, tribe Myrmarachnini) in Maddison's 2016 classification of the family Salticidae. Prószyński placed the separate genus in his informal group "myrmarachnines".

=== Species ===
As of August 2020, the World Spider Catalog accepted the following extant species:

- Emertonius exasperans (Peckham & Peckham, 1892) (type species) – Indonesia (Java, Bali)
- Emertonius koomeni Prószyński, 2018 – Malaysia (Borneo)
- Emertonius malayanus (Edmunds & Prószyński, 2003) – Malaysia (peninsula, Borneo), Indonesia (Sumatra, Borneo)
- Emertonius palawensis Prószyński, 2018 – Philippines
- Emertonius shelfordi (Peckham & Peckham, 1907) – Malaysia (Borneo)
