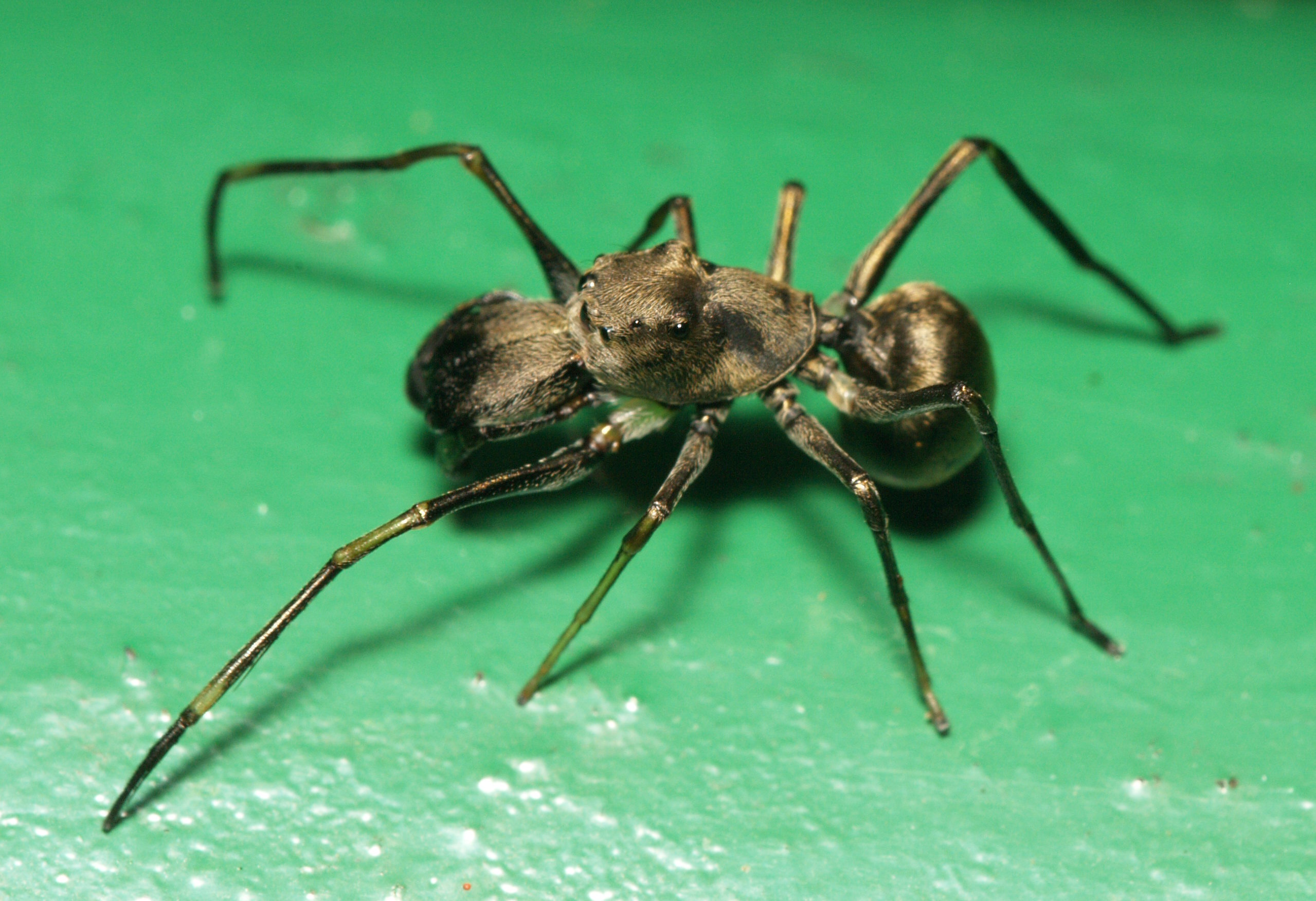
- T. magnus, male

Scientific classification
- Kingdom: Animalia
- Phylum: Arthropoda
- Subphylum: Chelicerata
- Class: Arachnida
- Order: Araneae
- Infraorder: Araneomorphae
- Family: Salticidae
- Subfamily: Salticinae
- Genus: Toxeus; Koch, 1846

Species
- 12, see text

= Toxeus (spider) =

Genus of spiders

Toxeus is a genus of jumping spiders first described by Carl Ludwig Koch in 1846. The genus was synonymized with Myrmarachne by Eugène Simon in 1901, and remained a synonym until revived by Jerzy Prószyński in 2016, when he split up Myrmarachne.

Prószyński placed Toxeus in his informal group "myrmarachnines". When synonymized with Myrmarachne, it was placed in the tribe Myrmarachnini, part of the Salticoida clade of the subfamily Salticinae in Maddison's 2015 classification of the family Salticidae.

== Species ==
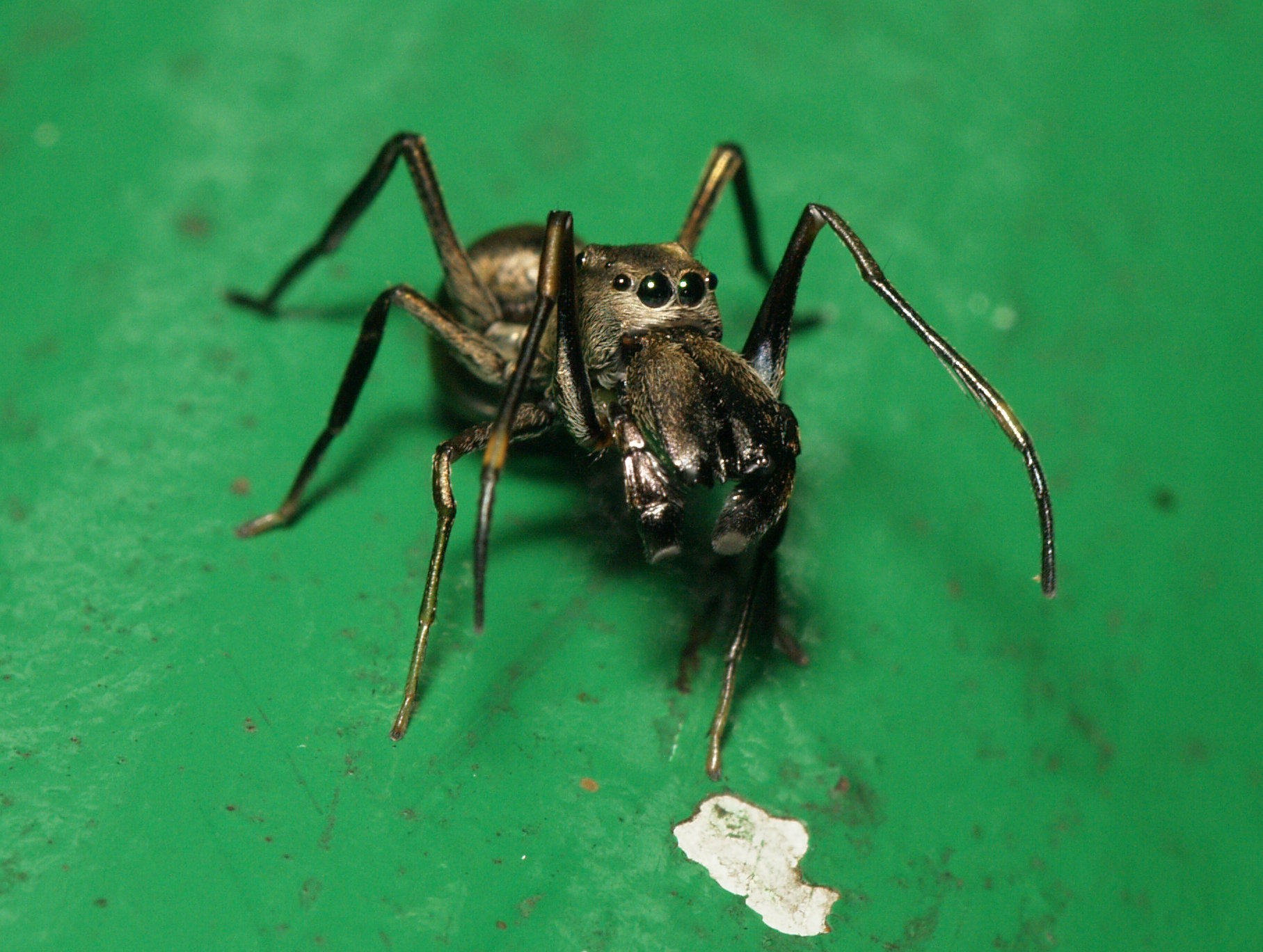
male T. magnus

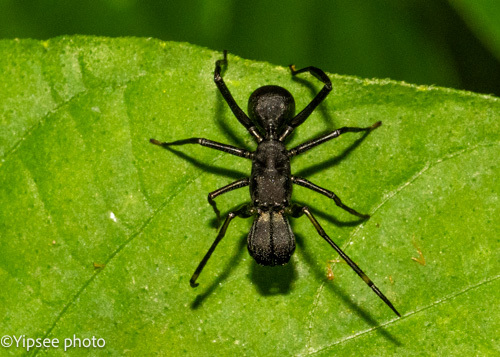
male T. maxillosus

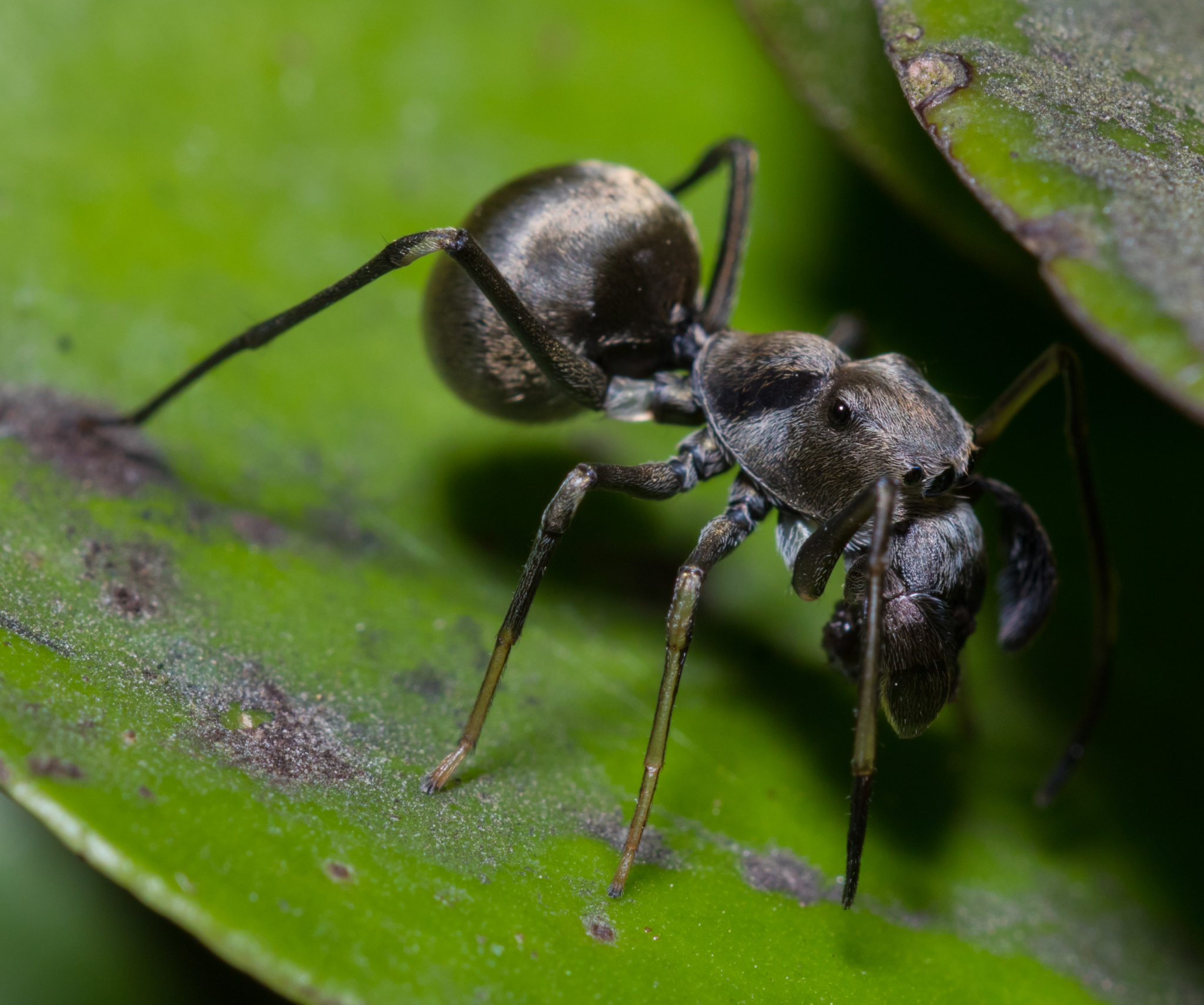
male T. globosus

As of February 2022, it includes the following species:

- Toxeus alboclavus Jose & Sudhikumar, 2022 – India
- Toxeus bicuspidatus (Yamasaki, 2012) – Sulawesi
- Toxeus cuneatus (Badcock, 1918) – Malaysia
- Toxeus globosus (Wanless, 1978) – Angola to China
- Toxeus grossus (Edmunds & Prószyński, 2003) – Malaysia
- Toxeus hainan Wang & Li, 2022 – Hainan
- Toxeus hirsutipalpi (Edmunds & Prószyński, 2003) – Malaysia, Singapore, Bali
- Toxeus jajpurensis (Prószyński, 1992) – India
- Toxeus latithoracicus (Yamasaki & Hung, 2012) – Ryukyu Islands
- Toxeus magnus (Saito, 1933) – Taiwan
- Toxeus maxillosus C. L. Koch, 1846 – Southeast Asia to Philippines, Sulawesi, Lombok
- Toxeus septemdentatus (Strand, 1907) – China
- Toxeus yamasakii Logunov, 2021 – Vietnam
