= Myrmarachne luctuosa =

Scientific classification
- Kingdom: Animalia
- Phylum: Arthropoda
- Subphylum: Chelicerata
- Class: Arachnida
- Order: Araneae
- Infraorder: Araneomorphae
- Family: Salticidae
- Genus: Myrmarachne
- Species: M. luctuosa

Binomial name
- Myrmarachne luctuosa (L. Koch, 1879)

Species of spider

Myrmarachne luctuosa is a species of spider in the jumping spider family (Salticidae). It is endemic to Mainland Australia.
