= Myrmarachne prava =

Scientific classification
- Kingdom: Animalia
- Phylum: Arthropoda
- Subphylum: Chelicerata
- Class: Arachnida
- Order: Araneae
- Infraorder: Araneomorphae
- Family: Salticidae
- Genus: Myrmarachne
- Species: M. prava

Binomial name
- Myrmarachne prava (Karsch, 1880)

Synonyms
- Salticus pravus Karsch, 1880

Species of spider

Myrmarachne prava is a species of spider of the genus Myrmarachne. It is endemic to Sri Lanka.
