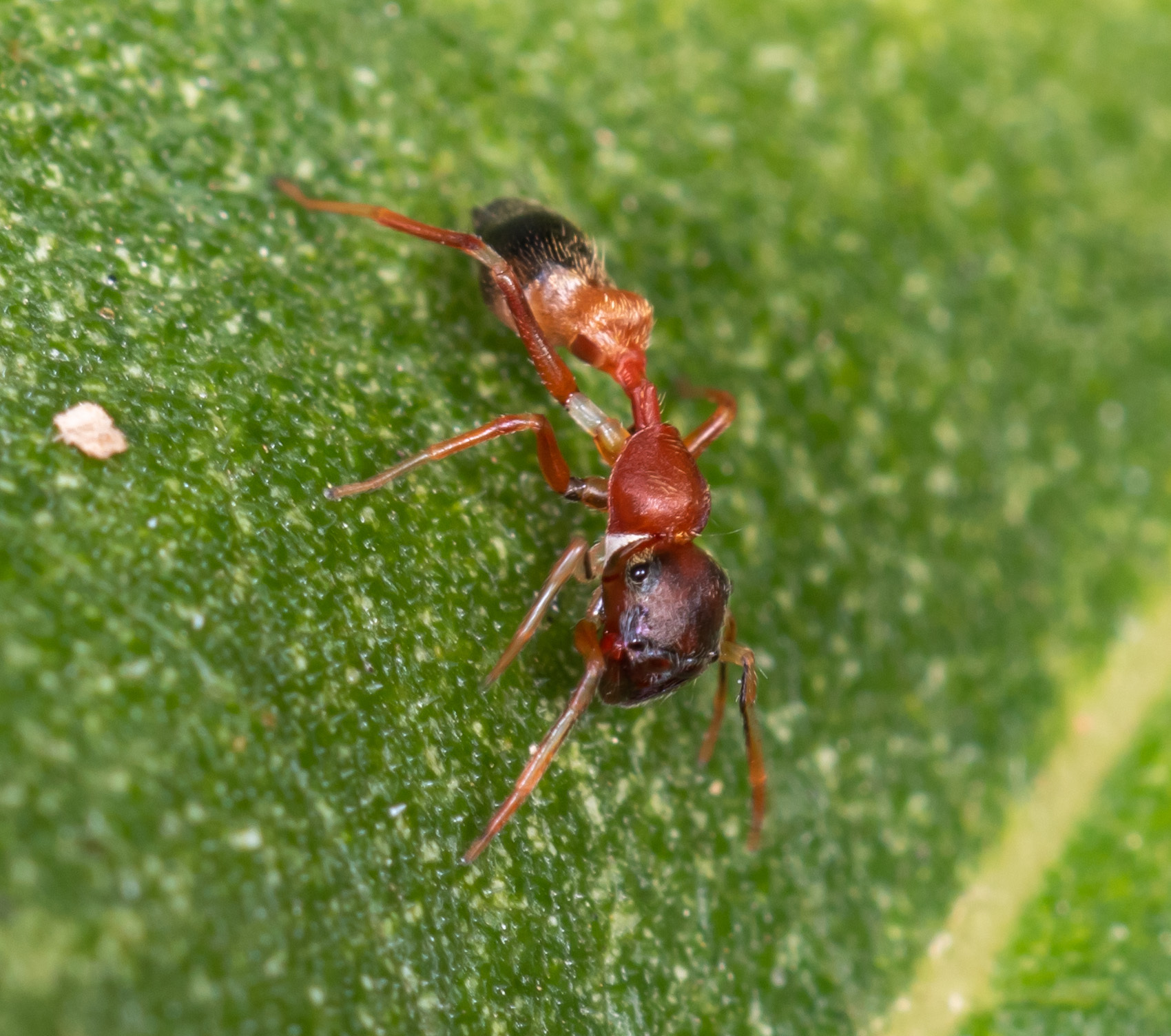
- female M. melanocephala from Thailand

Scientific classification
- Kingdom: Animalia
- Phylum: Arthropoda
- Subphylum: Chelicerata
- Class: Arachnida
- Order: Araneae
- Infraorder: Araneomorphae
- Family: Salticidae
- Genus: Myrmarachne
- Species: M. melanocephala

Binomial name
- Myrmarachne melanocephala MacLeay, 1839

Synonyms
- Salticus contractus Karsch, 1880; Salticus providens Peckham & Peckham, 1892; Myrmarachne providens Simon, 1901

= Myrmarachne melanocephala =

Species of spider

Myrmarachne melanocephala, is a species of spider of the genus Myrmarachne, a genus of ant-mimicking jumping spiders. It is found throughout the countries ranging from Pakistan to Indonesia. Type locality has been recorded as Bengal of British India (present day West Bengal, India).

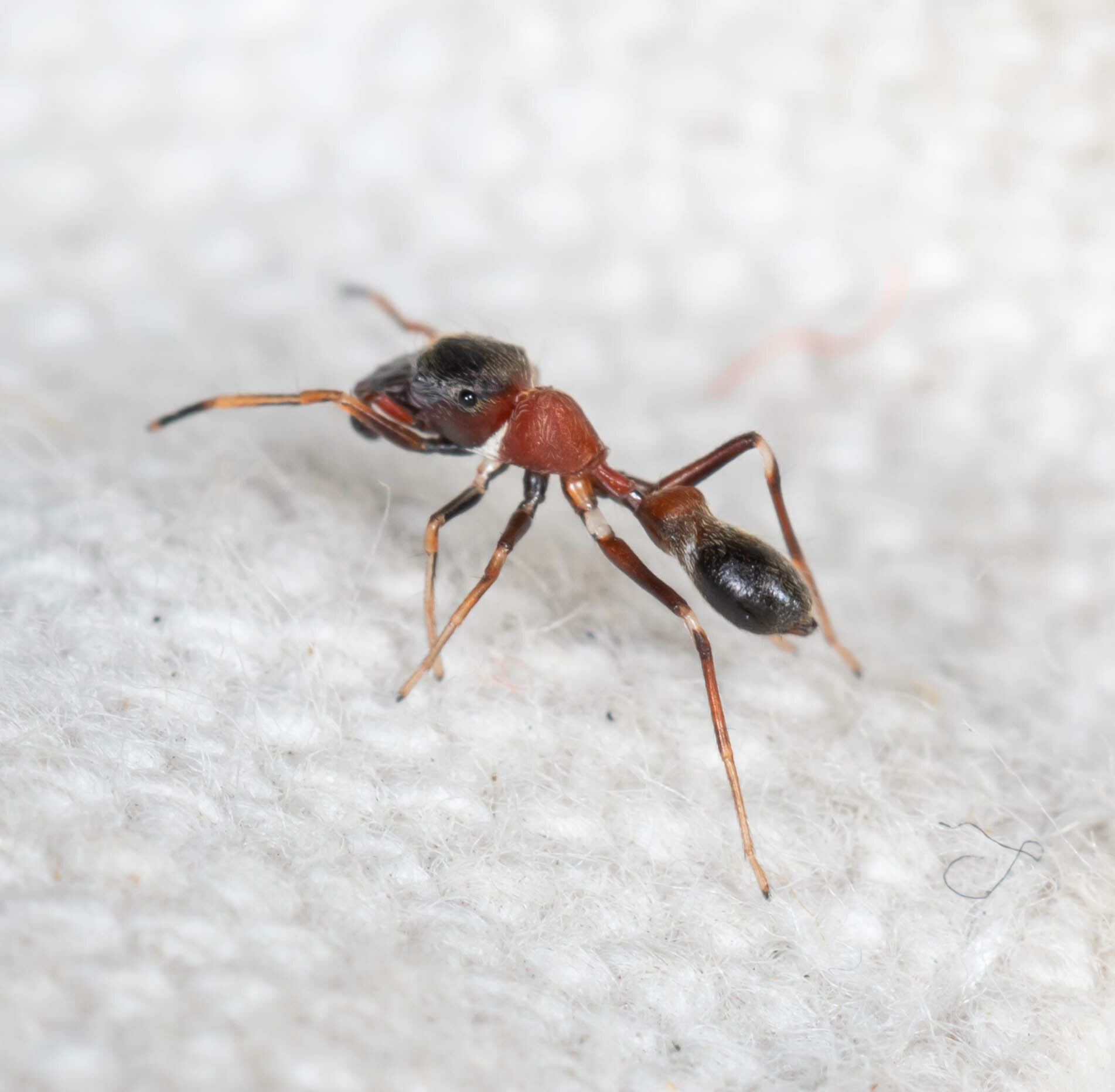
female from Thailand

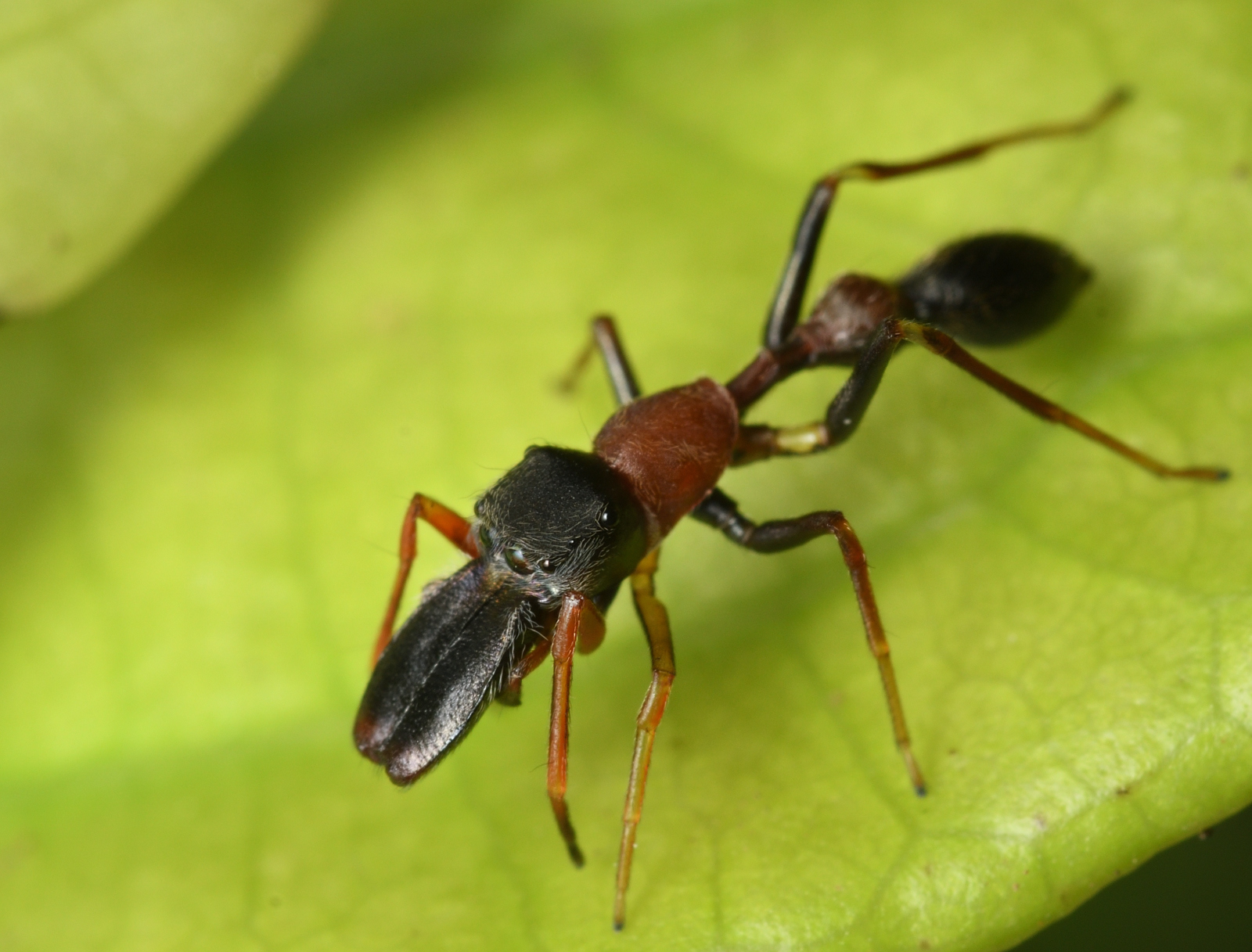
male from India
