= Myrmarachne uniseriata =

Scientific classification
- Kingdom: Animalia
- Phylum: Arthropoda
- Subphylum: Chelicerata
- Class: Arachnida
- Order: Araneae
- Infraorder: Araneomorphae
- Family: Salticidae
- Genus: Myrmarachne
- Species: M. uniseriata

Binomial name
- Myrmarachne uniseriata Narayan, 1915

Synonyms
- Myrmarachne aurantiaca Benjamin, 2015

Species of spider

Myrmarachne uniseriata is a species of spider of the family Salticidae. It is native to India and Sri Lanka. In Sri Lanka, the species was found in the Ethagala range of Kurunegala District. The species can easily identified by the reddish orange-coloured carapace and dorsally flat chelicerae of male.

The species was first described by Narayan in 1915. Separately, Myrmarachne aurantiaca was described by Benjamin in 2015. In 2017, Caleb and Benjamin reduced the latter name to a synonym of Myrmarachne uniseriata.
