= Myrmarachne bicurvata =

Scientific classification
- Kingdom: Animalia
- Phylum: Arthropoda
- Subphylum: Chelicerata
- Class: Arachnida
- Order: Araneae
- Infraorder: Araneomorphae
- Family: Salticidae
- Genus: Myrmarachne
- Species: M. bicurvata

Binomial name
- Myrmarachne bicurvata (O. Pickard-Cambridge, 1869)

Synonyms
- Salticus bicurvatus O. Pickard-Cambridge, 1869

Species of spider

Myrmarachne bicurvata is a species of spider of the family Salticidae. It is endemic to Sri Lanka.
