= Myrmarachne ramunni =

Scientific classification
- Kingdom: Animalia
- Phylum: Arthropoda
- Subphylum: Chelicerata
- Class: Arachnida
- Order: Araneae
- Infraorder: Araneomorphae
- Family: Salticidae
- Genus: Myrmarachne
- Species: M. ramunni

Binomial name
- Myrmarachne ramunni Narayan, 1915

Species of spider

Myrmarachne ramunni is a species of spiders of the genus Myrmarachne. It is native to India, Pakistan and Sri Lanka.
