= Myrmage imbellis =

Scientific classification
- Kingdom: Animalia
- Phylum: Arthropoda
- Subphylum: Chelicerata
- Class: Arachnida
- Order: Araneae
- Infraorder: Araneomorphae
- Family: Salticidae
- Genus: Myrmage
- Species: M. imbellis

Binomial name
- Myrmage imbellis (Peckham & Peckham, 1892)

Synonyms
- Salticus imbellis Peckham & Peckham, 1892

Species of spider

Myrmage imbellis (syn.: Myrmarachne imbellis), is a species of spider of the genus Myrmage. It is endemic to Sri Lanka.
