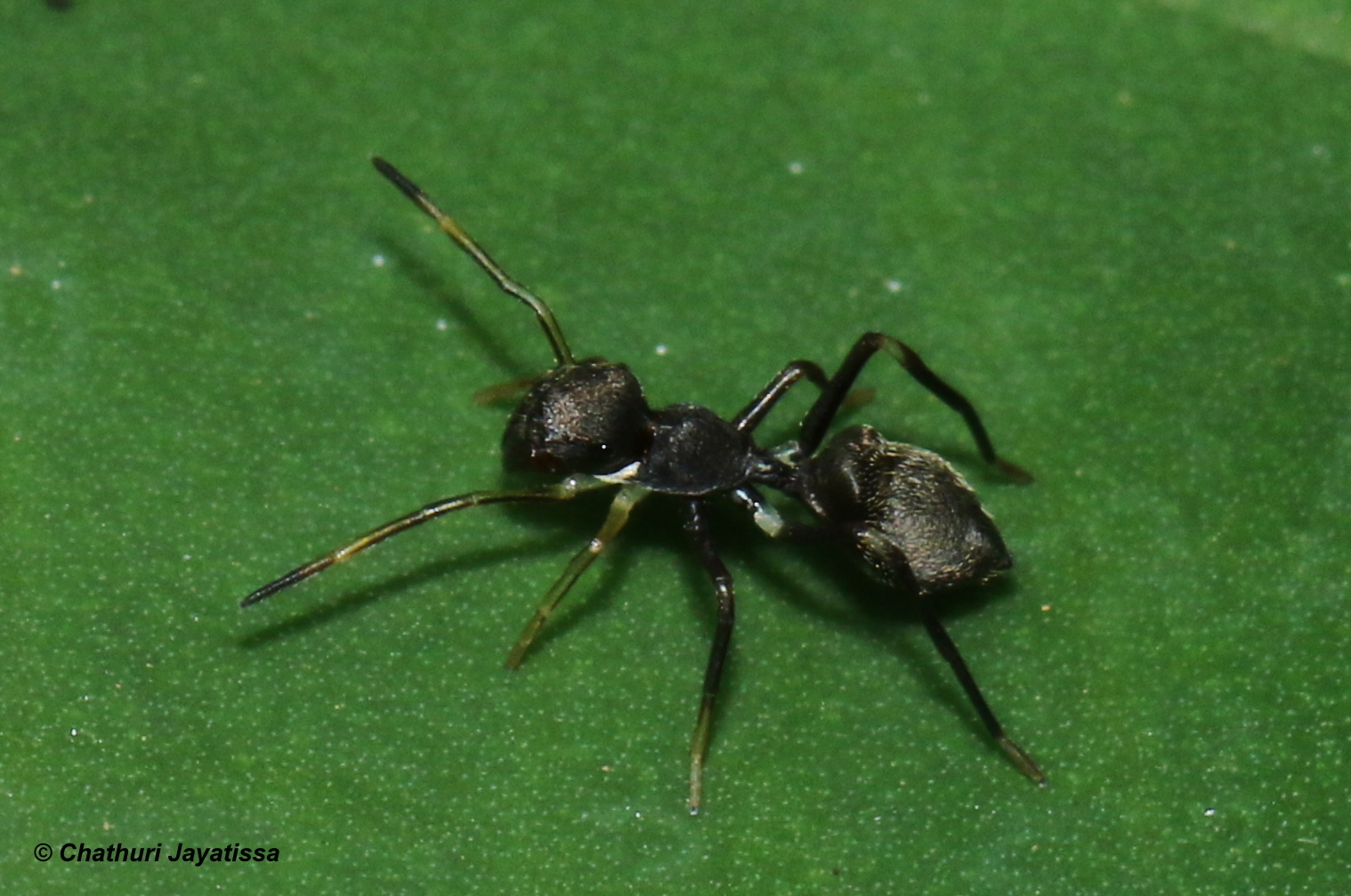

Scientific classification
- Kingdom: Animalia
- Phylum: Arthropoda
- Subphylum: Chelicerata
- Class: Arachnida
- Order: Araneae
- Infraorder: Araneomorphae
- Family: Salticidae
- Genus: Myrmarachne
- Species: M. spissa

Binomial name
- Myrmarachne spissa (Peckham & Peckham, 1892)

= Myrmarachne spissa =

Species of spider

Myrmarachne spissa is a species of spider of the family Salticidae. It is endemic to Sri Lanka.
