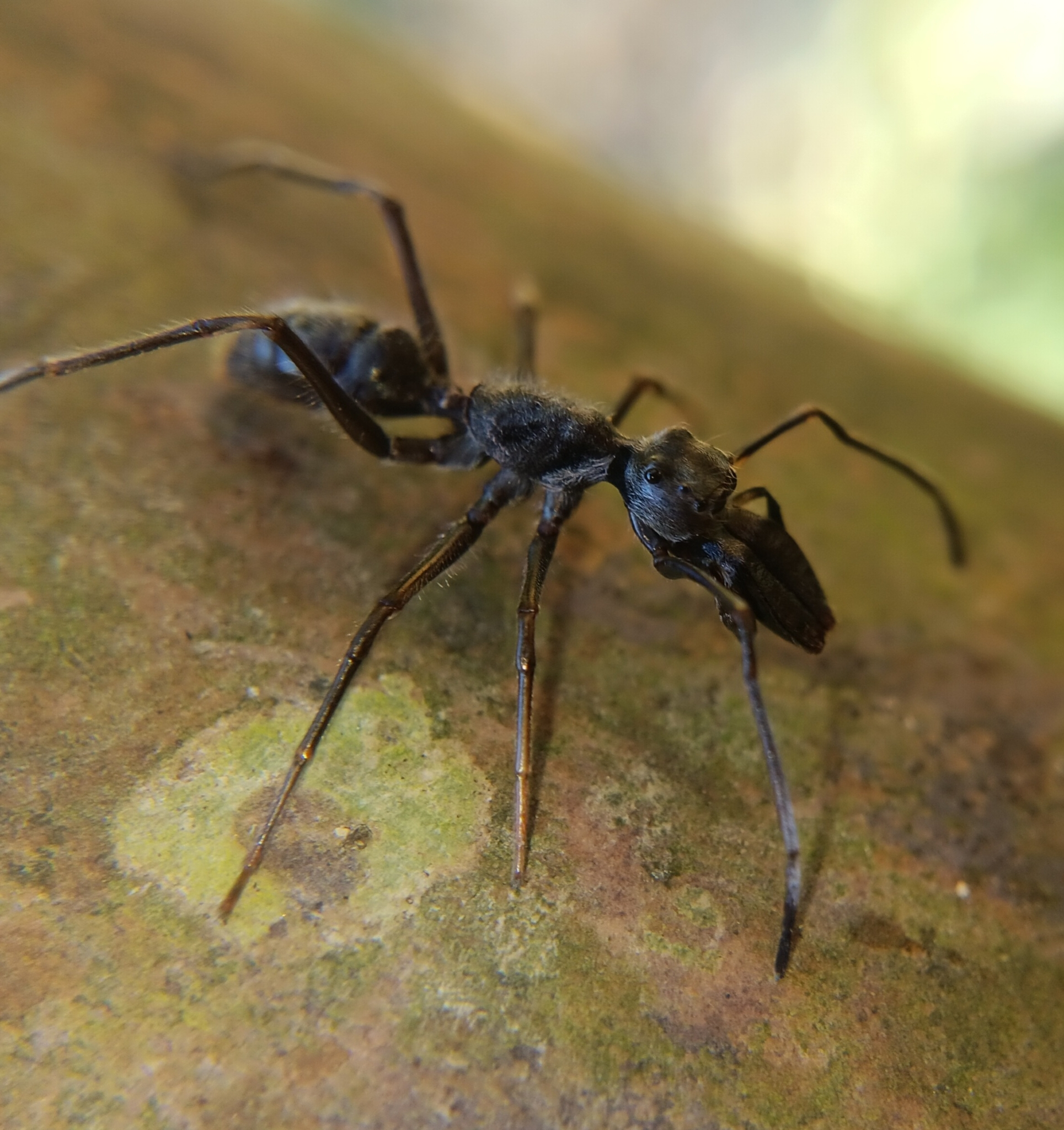

Scientific classification
- Kingdom: Animalia
- Phylum: Arthropoda
- Subphylum: Chelicerata
- Class: Arachnida
- Order: Araneae
- Infraorder: Araneomorphae
- Family: Salticidae
- Subfamily: Salticinae
- Genus: Bocus; Peckham & Peckham, 1892

Type species
- B. excelsus Peckham & Peckham, 1892

Species
- B. angusticollis Deeleman-Reinhold & Floren, 2003 – Borneo; B. excelsus Peckham & Peckham, 1892 – Philippines; B. philippinensis Wanless, 1978 – Philippines

= Bocus =

Genus of spiders

Bocus is a genus of Southeast Asian jumping spiders that was first described by George Peckham & Elizabeth Peckham in 1892. As of June 2019, it contains only three species, which are found only in the Philippines and Indonesia.
