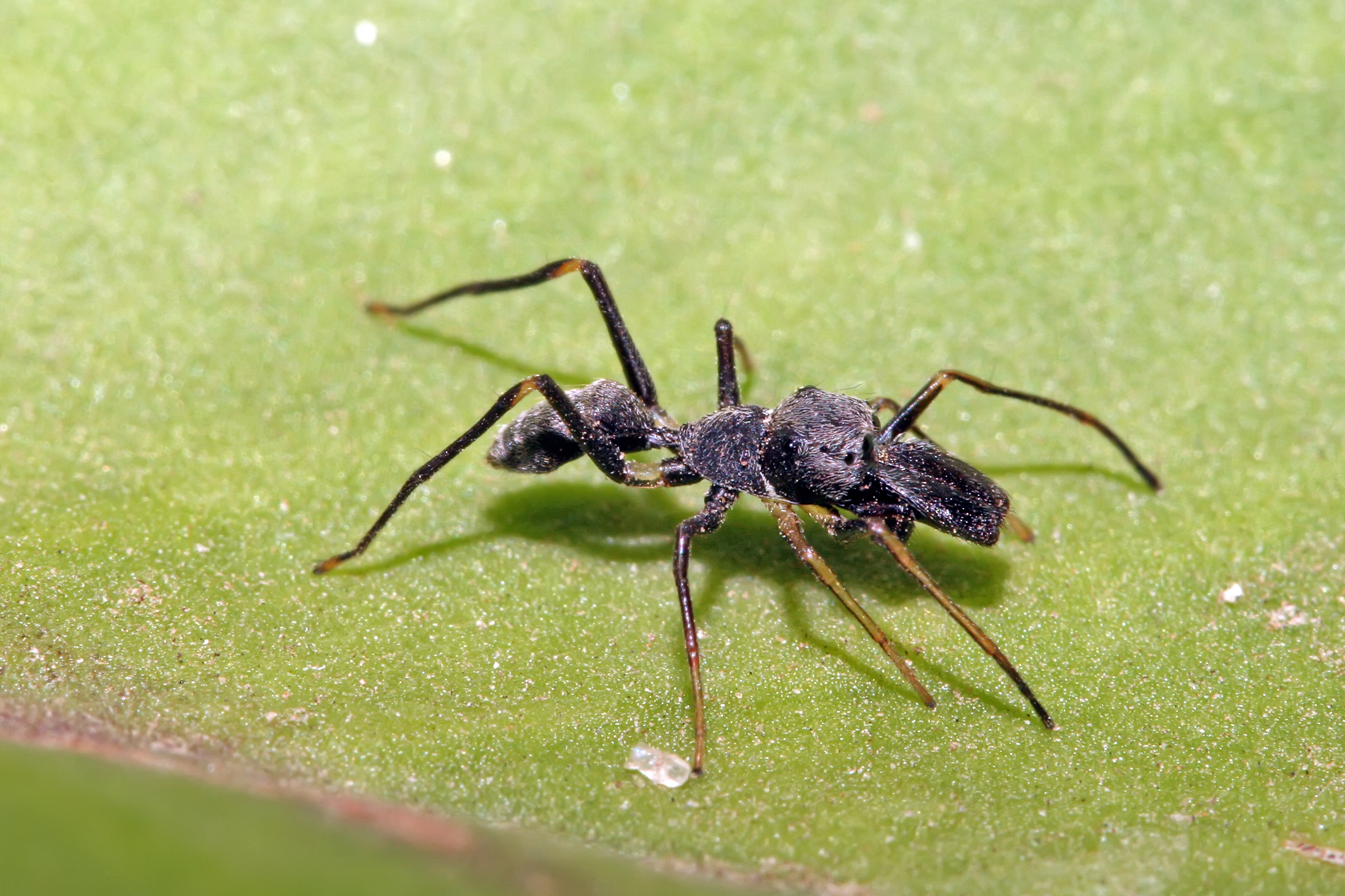
- Myrmarachne sp. mimicking an ant

Scientific classification
- Kingdom: Animalia
- Phylum: Arthropoda
- Subphylum: Chelicerata
- Class: Arachnida
- Order: Araneae
- Infraorder: Araneomorphae
- Family: Salticidae
- Subfamily: Salticinae
- Genus: Myrmarachne; MacLeay, 1839

Type species
- M. melanocephala MacLeay, 1839

Species
- 188, see text

Synonyms
- Ascalus Thorell, 1894; Bizonella Strand, 1929; Herilus Thorell, 1894; Iola Peckham & Peckham, 1892; Pergasus Thorell, 1894

= Myrmarachne =

Genus of spiders

Myrmarachne is a genus of ant-mimicking jumping spiders that was first described by W. S. MacLeay in 1839. They are commonly called ant-mimicking spiders, but they are not the only spiders that have this attribute. The name is a combination of Ancient Greek μύρμηξ (myrmex), meaning "ant", and ἀράχνη (arachne), meaning "spider".

This genus has undergone many changes, and is still under review as more information becomes available. In 2016, several genera were split off, including Helicius and the monotypic genus Panachraesta. The genus Emertonius was revalidated in 2018 after being synonymized with Myrmarachne for nearly thirty years.

== Description ==
Myrmarachne have an elongated cephalothorax with relatively long chelicerae that projects forward in males. The chelicerae of males can lack venom glands. The cephalothorax has a waist, and the opisthosoma often has one too. The colors can vary from black to yellow, depending on ant species it is mimicking, and can change over the course of its life. For example, one African species was observed to mimic a certain species of ants as a juvenile, and another ant species as an adult.

They tend to wave their front legs in the air to simulate antennae, and many have bodies that also closely resemble ants. It was assumed they didn't use their front legs for locomotion at all, but high-speed cameras have shown that they move around using all eight legs, raising their forelimbs only when stationary.

The genus Bocus is so similar to Myrmarachne that it cannot be distinguished without the help of a microscope.

== Species ==
With about 80 described and many undescribed southeast Asian species, Myrmarachne is the most diverse genus of jumping spider in this region. A few species, such as the palearctic M. formicaria, occur in temperate regions.

Myrmarachne are found in the tropics from Africa to Australia, with some species found in the New World.

As of October 2025, this genus includes 188 species and three subspecies.

These species have articles on Wikipedia:

- Myrmarachne bicurvata (O. Pickard-Cambridge, 1869) – Sri Lanka
- Myrmarachne clavigera (Thorell, 1877) – Indonesia (Sulawesi)
- Myrmarachne elongata Szombathy, 1915 – Africa, Japan, China, Vietnam
- Myrmarachne formicaria (De Geer, 1778) – Macaronesia, Europe, Turkey, Caucasus, Russia (Europe, Caucasus, Far East), Iran, China, Korea, Japan. Introduced to Canada, United States
- Myrmarachne luctuosa (L. Koch, 1879) – Australia (New South Wales, South Australia, Victoria, Queensland)
- Myrmarachne melanocephala MacLeay, 1839 – Pakistan to Vietnam and Indonesia (type species)
- Myrmarachne melanotarsa Wesołowska & Salm, 2002 – Kenya, China?
- Myrmarachne morningside Benjamin, 2015 – Sri Lanka
- Myrmarachne prava (Karsch, 1880) – Pakistan, India, Sri Lanka
- Myrmarachne ramunni Narayan, 1915 – Pakistan, India, Sri Lanka
- Myrmarachne spissa (G. W. Peckham & E. G. Peckham, 1892) – India, Sri Lanka
- Myrmarachne striatipes (L. Koch, 1879) – Australia (New South Wales, Victoria, Tasmania)
- Myrmarachne uniseriata Narayan, 1915 – India, Sri Lanka
Male M. albocincta

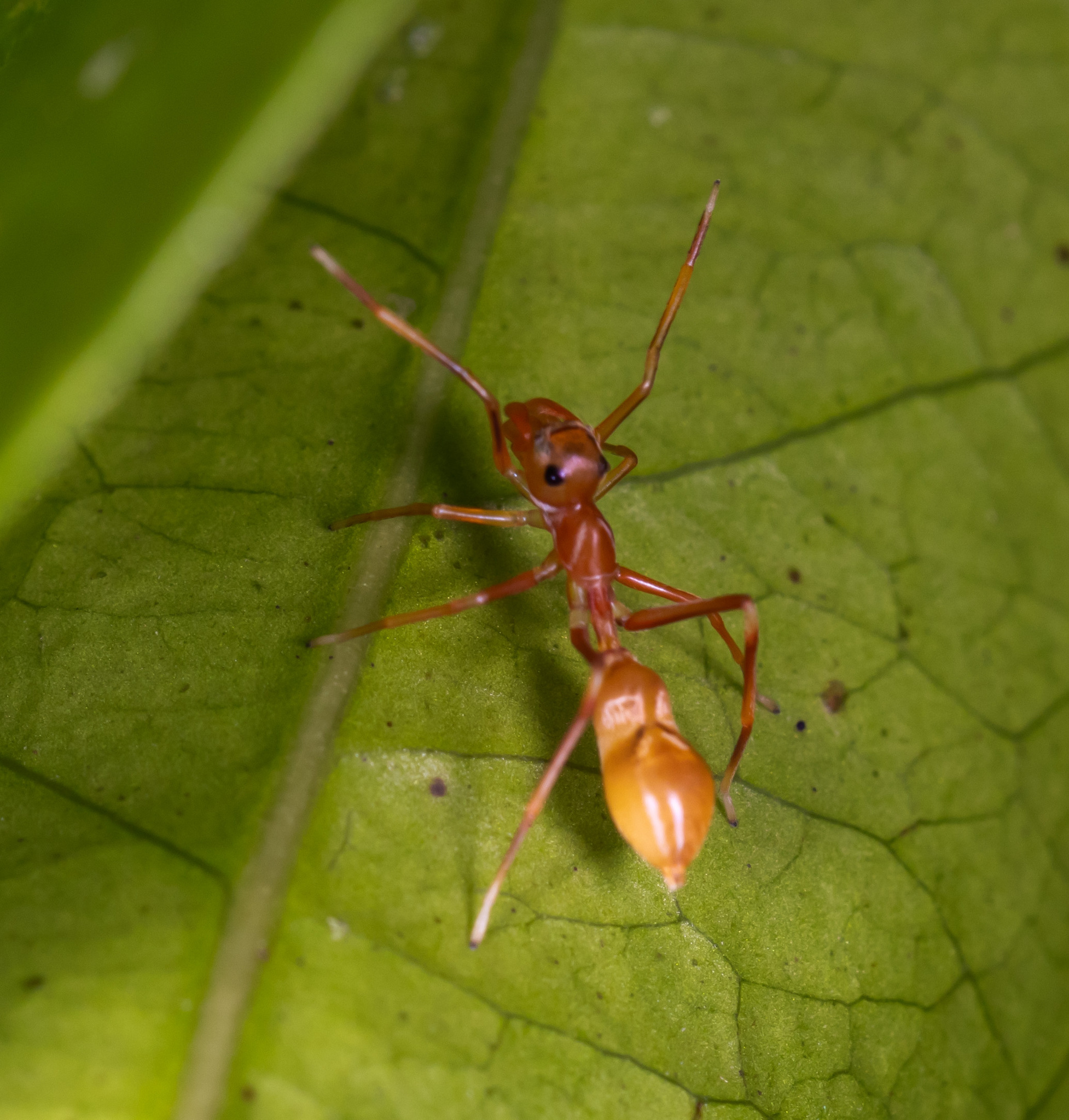
Female M. clavigera

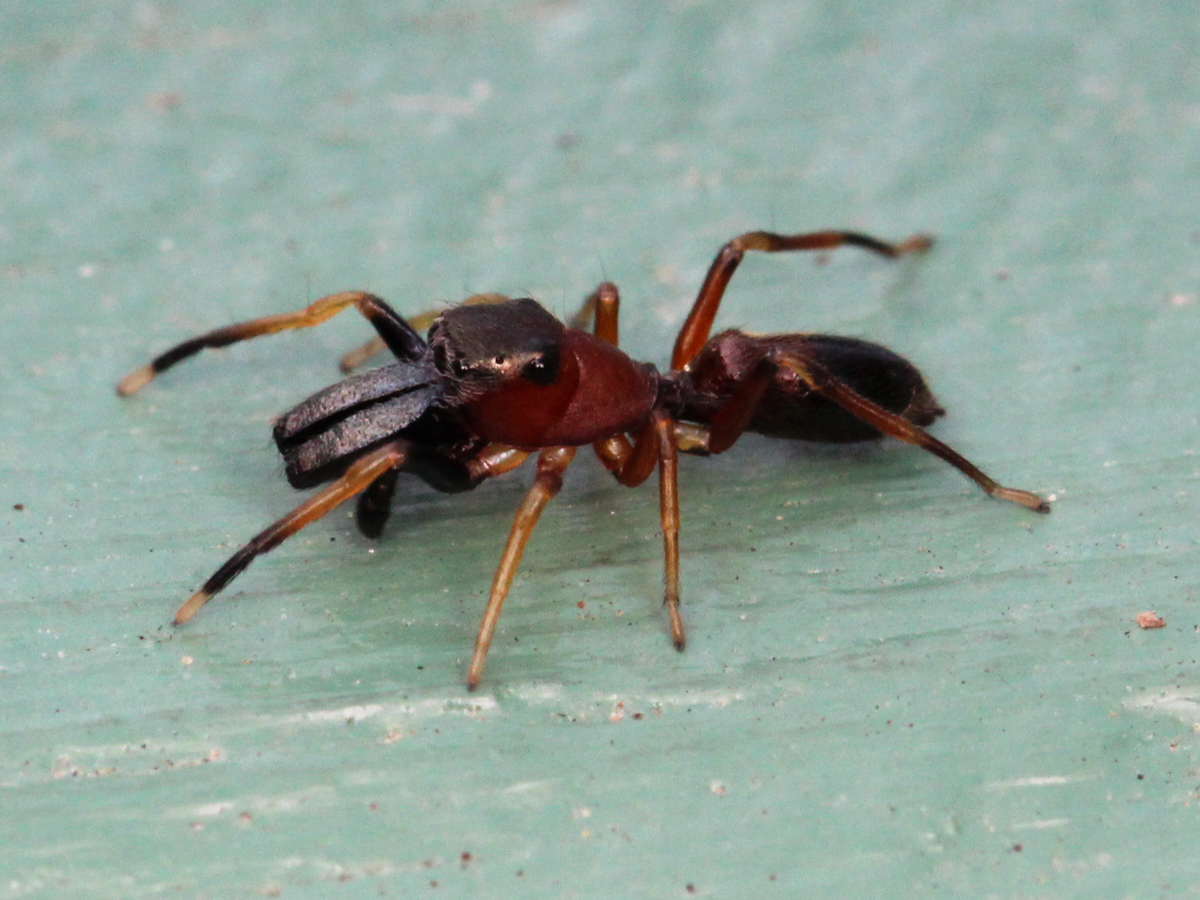
Male M. formicaria

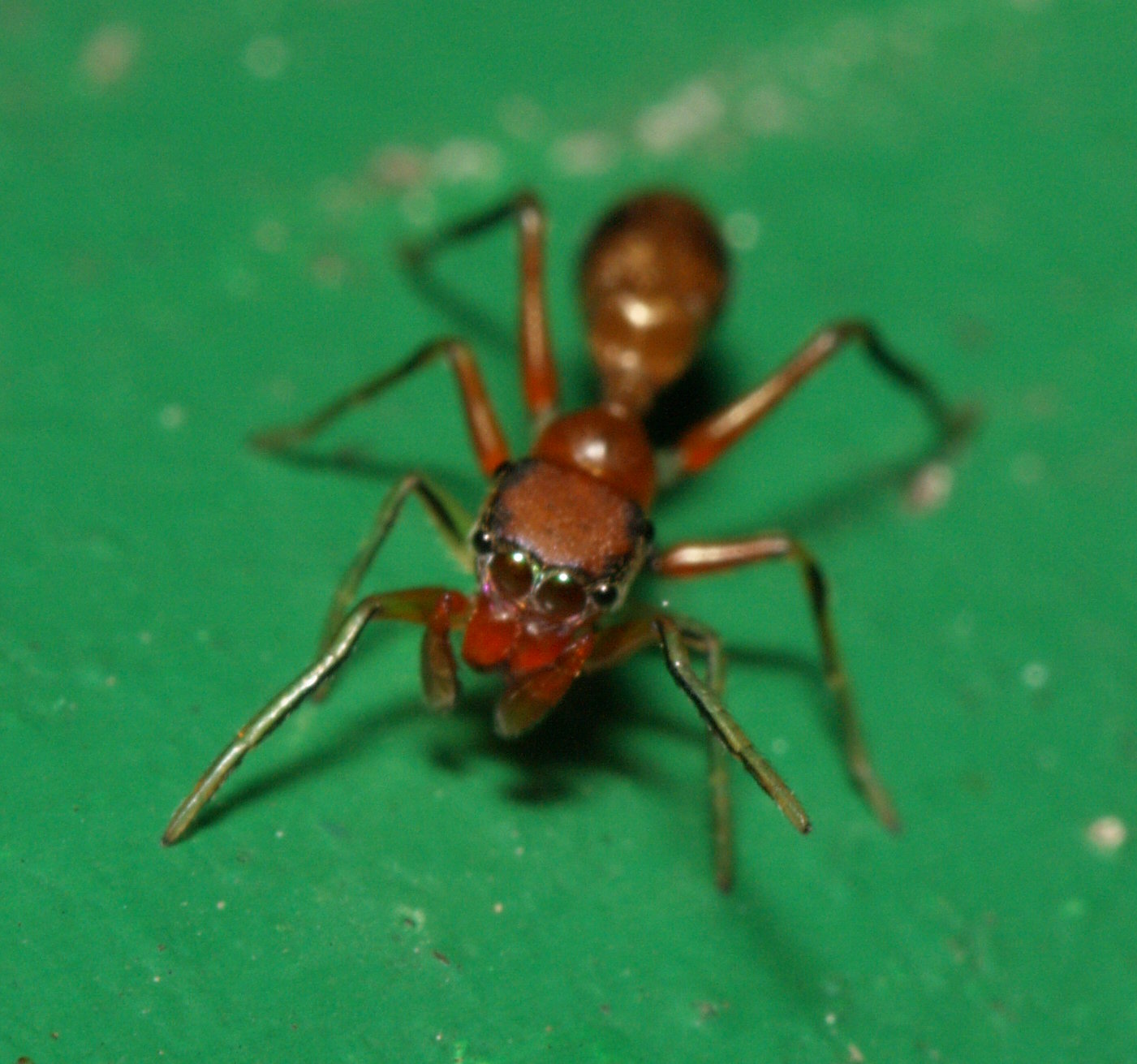
Female M. formosana

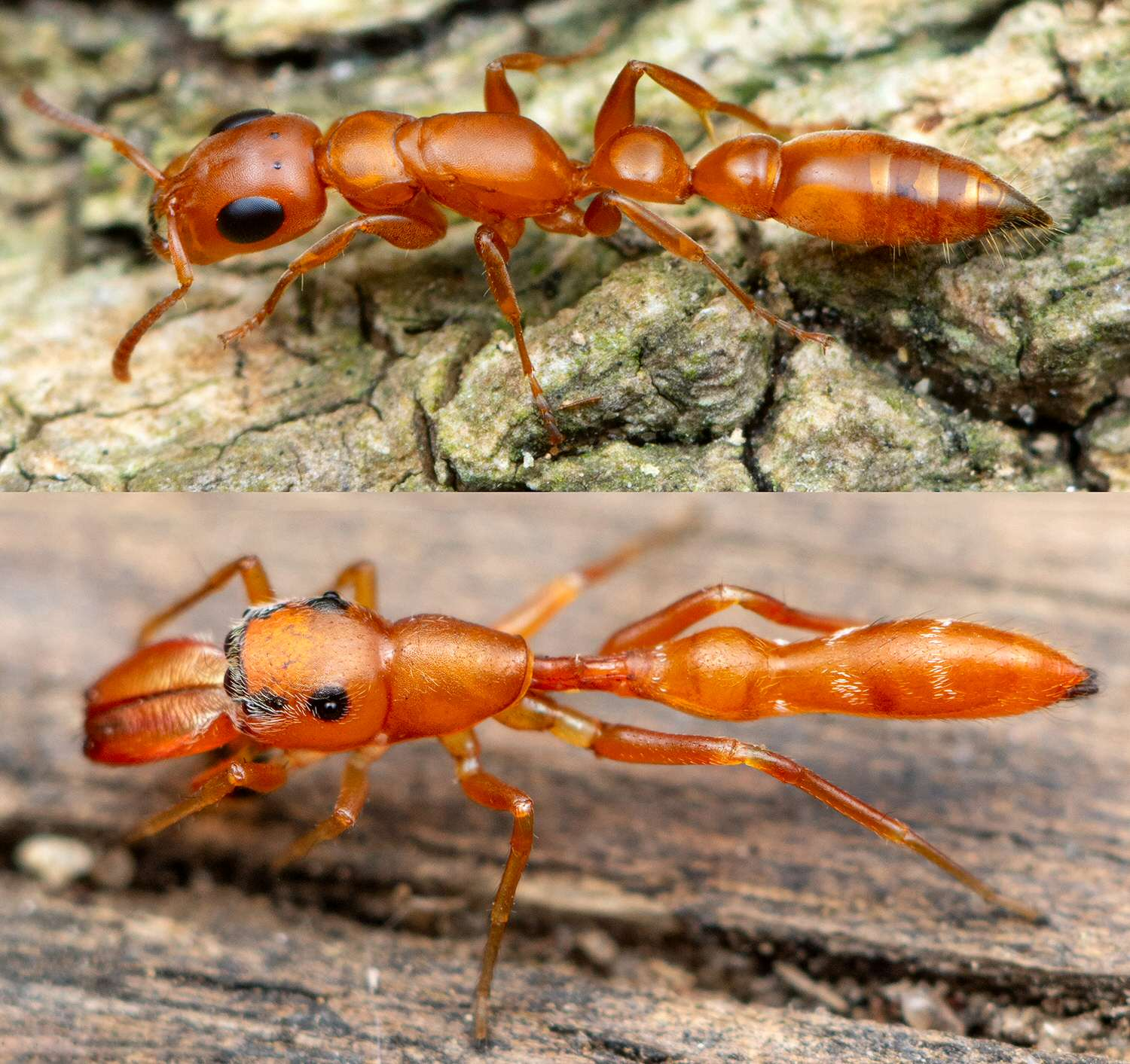
M. ichneumon and ant model

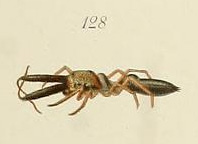
Male M. inermichelis

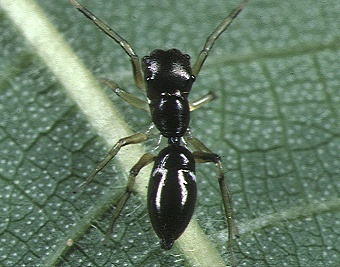
Female M. japonica

Male M. kochi

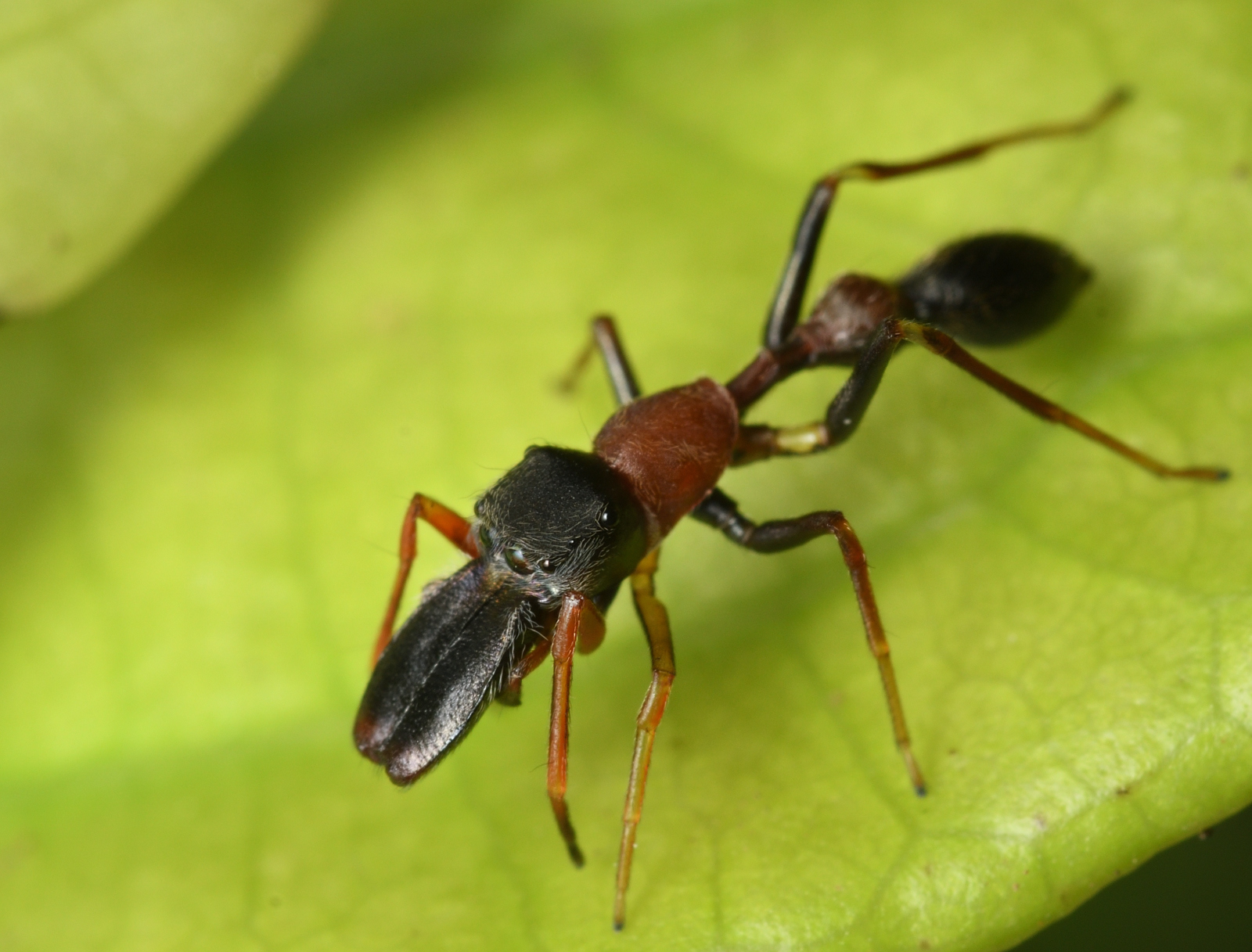
Male M. melanocephala

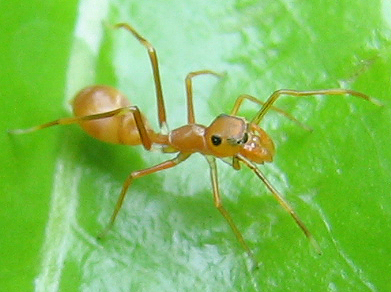
Female M. plataleoides

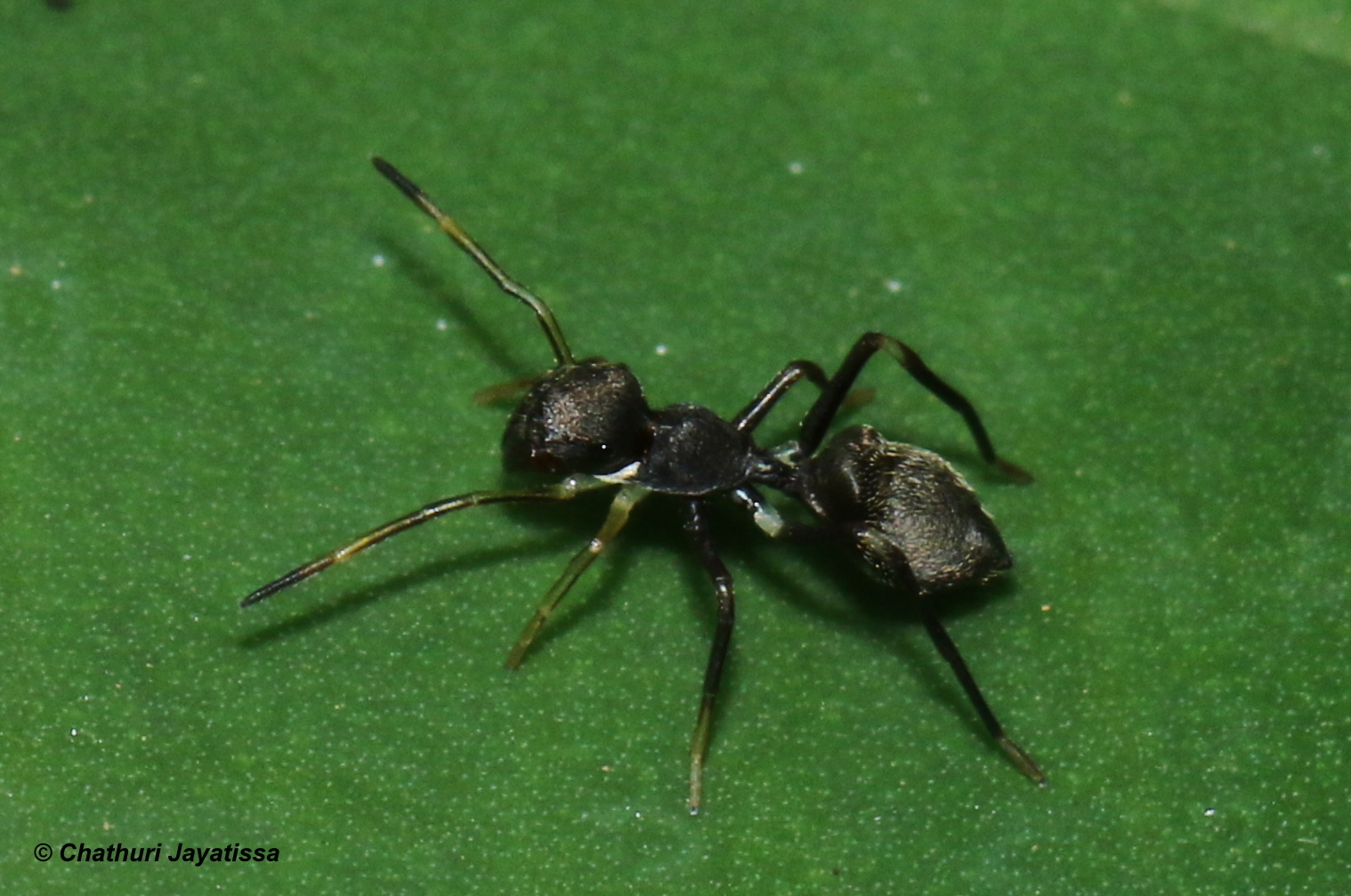
M. spissa

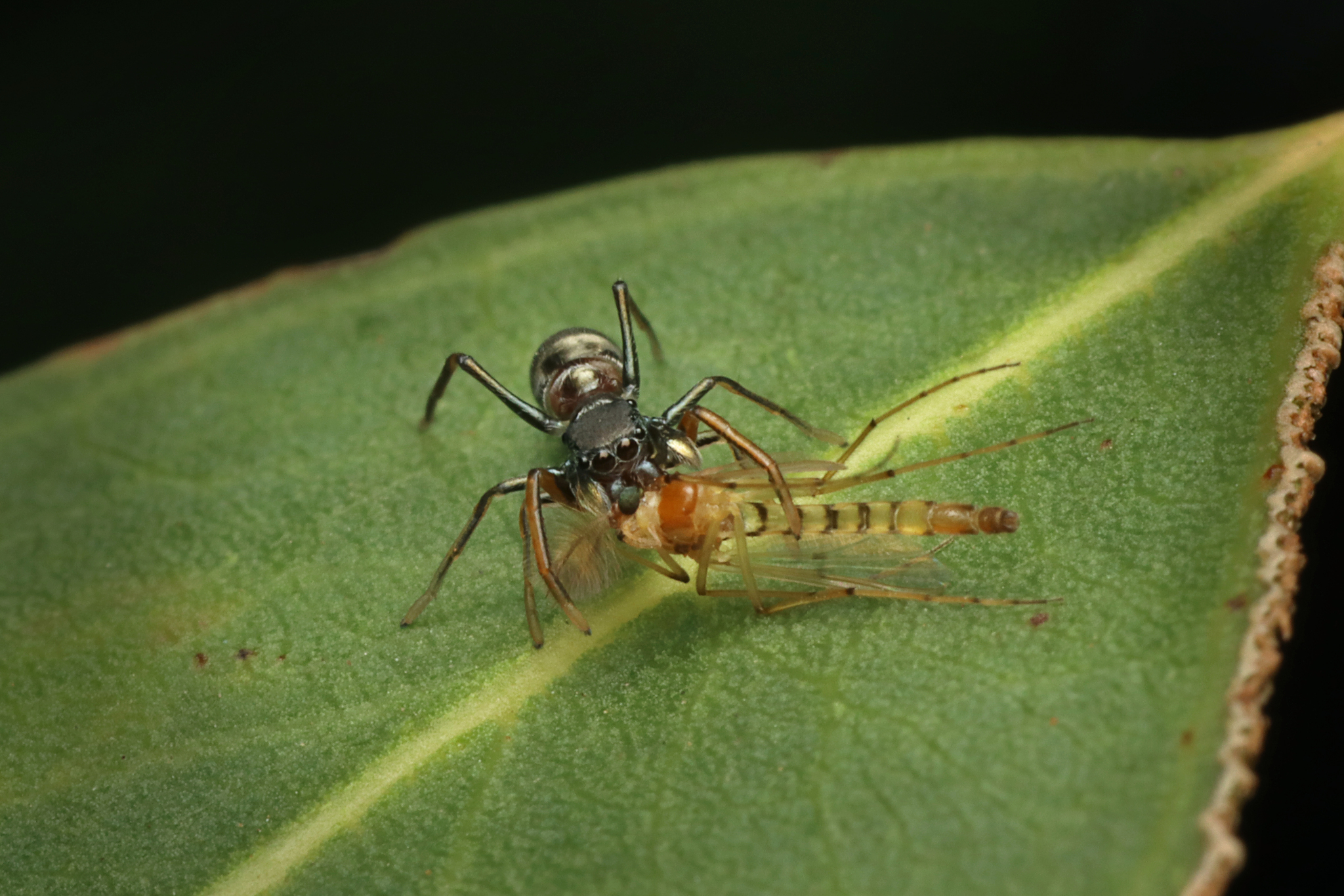
M. striatipes with prey

Complete species list as of October 2025
- Myrmarachne acromegalis Yamasaki & Ahmad, 2013 – Thailand, Indonesia (Borneo)
- Myrmarachne acutidens Yamasaki & Edwards, 2013 – Indonesia
- Myrmarachne albocincta (C. L. Koch, 1846) – United States
- Myrmarachne albosetosa Wanless, 1978 – South Africa
- Myrmarachne alticeps (Thorell, 1890) – Indonesia (Java)
- Myrmarachne amabilis Yamasaki, 2018 – Malaysia (Borneo)
- Myrmarachne angusta (Thorell, 1877) – China to Indonesia (Sulawesi)
- Myrmarachne annandalei Simon, 1901 – Malaysia
- Myrmarachne assimilis Banks, 1930 – Malaysia (Borneo), Philippines
- Myrmarachne attenuata (Karsch, 1880) – Philippines
- Myrmarachne attenuata (O. Pickard-Cambridge, 1901) – Singapore
- Myrmarachne augusta (G. W. Peckham & E. G. Peckham, 1892) – Madagascar
- Myrmarachne aurea Ceccarelli, 2010 – Australia (Northern Territory, Queensland)
- Myrmarachne bakeri Banks, 1930 – Philippines
- Myrmarachne balinese Prószyński & Deeleman-Reinhold, 2010 – Indonesia (Bali)
- Myrmarachne bamakoi Berland & Millot, 1941 – Mali
- Myrmarachne bicolor (L. Koch, 1879) – Australia (Queensland, Northern Territory)
- Myrmarachne bicurvata (O. Pickard-Cambridge, 1869) – Sri Lanka
- Myrmarachne bidentata Banks, 1930 – Philippines
- Myrmarachne biseratensis Badcock, 1918 – Malaysia, Indonesia (Borneo)
- Myrmarachne brevis Xiao, 2002 – China
- Myrmarachne caliraya Barrion & Litsinger, 1995 – India, Philippines
- Myrmarachne capito (Thorell, 1890) – Indonesia (Java)
- Myrmarachne chapmani Banks, 1930 – Philippines
- Myrmarachne circulus Xiao & Wang, 2004 – China
- Myrmarachne clavigera (Thorell, 1877) – Indonesia (Sulawesi)
- Myrmarachne collarti Roewer, 1965 – DR Congo, Uganda
- Myrmarachne concava Zhu, J. X. Zhang, Z. S. Zhang & Chen, 2005 – China
- Myrmarachne confusa Wanless, 1978 – Angola, São Tomé and Príncipe
- Myrmarachne consobrina Denis, 1955 – Niger
- Myrmarachne constricta (Blackwall, 1877) – Seychelles
- Myrmarachne contracta (Karsch, 1880) – Indonesia
- Myrmarachne cornuta Badcock, 1918 – China, Vietnam, Thailand, Malaysia (peninsula, Borneo), Singapore, Indonesia (Sumatra, Borneo, Java)
- Myrmarachne corpuzrarosae Barrion, 1981 – Philippines
- Myrmarachne corusca Wiśniewski & Wesołowska, 2024 – Uganda
- Myrmarachne cowani (G. W. Peckham & E. G. Peckham, 1892) – Madagascar
- Myrmarachne crassembolus Yamasaki & Ahmad, 2013 – Borneo
- Myrmarachne cyrtodens Yamasaki & Ahmad, 2013 – Borneo
- Myrmarachne debilis (Thorell, 1890) – Indonesia (Java)
- Myrmarachne decorata Reimoser, 1927 – Indonesia (Sumatra)
- Myrmarachne dilatata (Karsch, 1880) – Malawi
- Myrmarachne dirangicus Bastawade, 2002 – India
- Myrmarachne dubia (G. W. Peckham & E. G. Peckham, 1892) – Philippines
- Myrmarachne dundoensis Wanless, 1978 – Angola, Kenya, Botswana
- Myrmarachne edentata Berry, Beatty & Prószyński, 1996 – Caroline Is. Mariana Is.
- Myrmarachne edentula (G. W. Peckham & E. G. Peckham, 1892) – Philippines
- Myrmarachne edwardsi Berry, Beatty & Prószyński, 1996 – Caroline Is.
- Myrmarachne eidmanni Roewer, 1942 – West Africa, DR Congo
- Myrmarachne elongata Szombathy, 1915 – Africa, Japan, China, Vietnam
- Myrmarachne endoi Yamasaki & Ahmad, 2013 – Malaysia (Borneo), Singapore, Indonesia (Simeulue)
- Myrmarachne epigealis Yamasaki & Edwards, 2013 – Indonesia
- Myrmarachne erythrocephalus (L. Koch, 1879) – Australia (Queensland, Western Australia, New South Wales)
- Myrmarachne eumenes (Simon, 1900) – Madagascar
- Myrmarachne evidens Roewer, 1965 – DR Congo, Uganda, Angola
- Myrmarachne foenisex Simon, 1909 – Senegal, Guinea, Ivory Coast, Ghana, Nigeria, Gabon, DR Congo, Angola
- Myrmarachne foreli Lessert, 1925 – Uganda, Angola, Botswana, Malawi, South Africa
- Myrmarachne formica (Doleschall, 1859) – Indonesia (Ambon)
- Myrmarachne formicaria (De Geer, 1778) – Macaronesia, Europe, Turkey, Caucasus, Russia (Europe, Caucasus, Far East), Iran, China, Korea, Japan. Introduced to Canada, United States
- Myrmarachne formosa (Thorell, 1890) – Indonesia (Sumatra, Sulawesi)
- Myrmarachne formosana (Matsumura, 1911) – Taiwan
- Myrmarachne formosana (Saito, 1933) – Taiwan
- Myrmarachne formosicola Strand, 1910 – Taiwan
- Myrmarachne fredwanlessi Logunov, 2021 – Vietnam
- Myrmarachne galea Wesołowska & Russell-Smith, 2022 – Ivory Coast
- Myrmarachne galianoae Cutler, 1981 – Bolivia
- Myrmarachne giltayi Roewer, 1965 – DR Congo, Kenya, Angola
- Myrmarachne gisti Fox, 1937 – China, Vietnam
- Myrmarachne glavisi Prószyński & Deeleman-Reinhold, 2010 – Bali
- Myrmarachne gurgulla Ceccarelli, 2010 – Australia (Queensland)
- Myrmarachne hamata C. Wang, Mi & Peng, 2023 – China
- Myrmarachne hashimotoi Yamasaki, 2018 – Malaysia (Borneo)
- Myrmarachne helensmithae Pekár, 2017 – Australia (Queensland, Northern Territory)
- Myrmarachne hesperia (Simon, 1887) – West Africa, Equatorial Guinea (Bioko)
- Myrmarachne hidaspis Caporiacco, 1935 – India (Karakorum)
- Myrmarachne himalayensis Narayan, 1915 – India
- Myrmarachne hoffmanni Strand, 1913 – China
- Myrmarachne ichneumon (Simon, 1886) – Kenya, Tanzania, Zanzibar, Mozambique, South Africa
- Myrmarachne incerta Narayan, 1915 – India
- Myrmarachne inermichelis Bösenberg & Strand, 1906 – Russia (Far East), Korea, Japan, China, Taiwan
- Myrmarachne inflatipalpis Wanless, 1978 – Botswana, Malawi, South Africa
- Myrmarachne iridescens Banks, 1930 – Philippines
- Myrmarachne isolata Clark & Benoit, 1977 – St. Helena
- Myrmarachne jacksoni Prószyński & Deeleman-Reinhold, 2010 – China, Indonesia (Bali)
- Myrmarachne jacobsoni Reimoser, 1925 – Indonesia (Sumatra)
- Myrmarachne japonica (Karsch, 1879) – Russia (Far East), China, Korea, Taiwan, Japan
- Myrmarachne jianfenglin Barrion, Barrion-Dupo & Heong, 2013 – China (Hainan)
- Myrmarachne kiboschensis Lessert, 1925 – Botswana to China
- Myrmarachne kilifi Wanless, 1978 – Kenya, Tanzania
- Myrmarachne kitale Wanless, 1978 – Guinea, Ivory Coast, Kenya
- Myrmarachne kochi Reimoser, 1925 – Malaysia, Indonesia
- Myrmarachne kuan Wang, Mi, Li & Xu, 2024 – China
- Myrmarachne kuwagata Yaginuma, 1967 – India, China, Korea, Japan
- Myrmarachne laeta (Thorell, 1887) – India, Pakistan, Indonesia (Nias Is.), China
  - M. l. flava Narayan, 1915 – Pakistan, India
  - M. l. praelonga (Thorell, 1890) – Myanmar
- Myrmarachne lagarosoma Yamasaki, 2018 – Malaysia (Borneo)
- Myrmarachne lambirensis Yamasaki & Ahmad, 2013 – Indonesia (Java, Borneo)
- Myrmarachne laurentina Bacelar, 1953 – Mozambique, South Africa
- Myrmarachne lawrencei Roewer, 1965 – Ethiopia, Gabon, DR Congo, Uganda, Kenya, Tanzania
- Myrmarachne legon Wanless, 1978 – Niger, Guinea, Ivory Coast, Ghana
- Myrmarachne leleupi Wanless, 1978 – South Africa
- Myrmarachne leptognatha (Thorell, 1890) – Indonesia (Java)
- Myrmarachne leptosoma Yamasaki, 2018 – Malaysia (Borneo)
- Myrmarachne lesserti Lawrence, 1938 – South Africa
- Myrmarachne linguiensis Zhang & Song, 1992 – China
- Myrmarachne liui Wang & Li, 2021 – China
- Myrmarachne longiventris (Simon, 1903) – Madagascar
- Myrmarachne luachimo Wanless, 1978 – Uganda, Angola
- Myrmarachne luctuosa (L. Koch, 1879) – Australia (New South Wales, South Australia, Victoria, Queensland)
- Myrmarachne lugens (Thorell, 1881) – Indonesia (Moluccas)
- Myrmarachne lugubris (Kulczyński, 1895) – Russia (Far East), China, Korea
- Myrmarachne lulengana Roewer, 1965 – Ethiopia, DR Congo, Uganda, Kenya, Botswana, South Africa
- Myrmarachne lulengensis Roewer, 1965 – DR Congo
- Myrmarachne lupata (L. Koch, 1879) – Australia (Queensland)
- Myrmarachne macaulayi Pekár, 2017 – Australia (Queensland, Northern Territory)
- Myrmarachne macleayana (Bradley, 1876) – Australia (Queensland)
- Myrmarachne macrognatha (Thorell, 1894) – Indonesia (Java, Flores)
- Myrmarachne mandibularis (Thorell, 1890) – Indonesia (Java)
- Myrmarachne manducator (Westwood, 1841) – India, Myanmar, Malaysia, Singapore, Indonesia (Sumatra)
- Myrmarachne markaha Barrion & Litsinger, 1995 – Malaysia (Borneo), Philippines
- Myrmarachne marshalli G. W. Peckham & E. G. Peckham, 1903 – Sub-Saharan Africa
- Myrmarachne mcgregori Banks, 1930 – Philippines
- Myrmarachne melanocephala MacLeay, 1839 – Pakistan to Vietnam and Indonesia (type species)
- Myrmarachne melanotarsa Wesołowska & Salm, 2002 – Kenya, China?
- Myrmarachne militaris Szombathy, 1913 – West, Central, East Africa
- Myrmarachne milledgei Pekár, 2017 – Australia (Queensland)
- Myrmarachne mixiaoqii Wang & Li, 2023 – China (Hainan)
- Myrmarachne moesta (Thorell, 1877) – Indonesia (Sulawesi)
- Myrmarachne morningside Benjamin, 2015 – Sri Lanka
- Myrmarachne myrmicaeformis (Lucas, 1871) – Algeria
- Myrmarachne naro Wanless, 1978 – Kenya
- Myrmarachne natalica Lessert, 1925 – South Africa
- Myrmarachne nemorensis (G. W. Peckham & E. G. Peckham, 1892) – Myanmar
- Myrmarachne nigella Simon, 1901 – Philippines. Introduced to Hawaii
- Myrmarachne nigeriensis Wanless, 1978 – Guinea, Ivory Coast, Ghana, Nigeria, São Tomé and Príncipe, Angola
- Myrmarachne nigra (Thorell, 1877) – Indonesia (Sulawesi)
- Myrmarachne nitidissima (Thorell, 1877) – Malaysia (Borneo), Indonesia (Sulawesi)
- Myrmarachne onceana Barrion & Litsinger, 1995 – Philippines
- Myrmarachne opaca (Karsch, 1880) – Malaysia (Borneo), Philippines
- Myrmarachne palladia Denis, 1958 – Afghanistan
- Myrmarachne paviei (Simon, 1886) – Thailand
- Myrmarachne pectorosa (Thorell, 1890) – Indonesia (Sumatra)
  - M. p. sternodes (Thorell, 1890) – Indonesia (Sumatra)
- Myrmarachne piercei Banks, 1930 – Philippines
- Myrmarachne pinakapalea Barrion & Litsinger, 1995 – Philippines
- Myrmarachne pinoysorum Barrion & Litsinger, 1995 – Philippines
- Myrmarachne pisarskii Berry, Beatty & Prószyński, 1996 – Caroline Is.
- Myrmarachne poonaensis Tikader, 1973 – India
- Myrmarachne prava (Karsch, 1880) – Pakistan, India, Sri Lanka
- Myrmarachne prognatha (Thorell, 1887) – Myanmar
- Myrmarachne providens (G. W. Peckham & E. G. Peckham, 1892) – Pakistan, India, Sri Lanka
- Myrmarachne pumilio (Karsch, 1880) – Bangladesh, Borneo, China, India, Indonesia, Vietnam
- Myrmarachne pygmaea (Thorell, 1894) – Singapore
- Myrmarachne radiata (Thorell, 1894) – Indonesia (Java)
- Myrmarachne ramosa Badcock, 1918 – Malaysia
- Myrmarachne ramunni Narayan, 1915 – Pakistan, India, Sri Lanka
- Myrmarachne rhopalota (Thorell, 1895) – Myanmar
- Myrmarachne richardsi Wanless, 1978 – Ghana
- Myrmarachne robusta (G. W. Peckham & E. G. Peckham, 1892) – India, Myanmar
- Myrmarachne roeweri Reimoser, 1934 – India
- Myrmarachne rufescens (Thorell, 1877) – Indonesia (Sulawesi)
- Myrmarachne rufisquei Berland & Millot, 1941 – Senegal
- Myrmarachne russellsmithi Wanless, 1978 – Nigeria
- Myrmarachne sabahna Yamasaki & Ahmad, 2013 – Malaysia (Borneo)
- Myrmarachne salaputium Yamasaki, 2018 – Malaysia (Borneo)
- Myrmarachne salongensis Pett, 2023 – DR Congo
- Myrmarachne satarensis Narayan, 1915 – India
- Myrmarachne schenkeli Peng & Li, 2002 – China (Hong Kong)
- Myrmarachne seriatis Banks, 1930 – Philippines
- Myrmarachne singularis Logunov, 2021 – Vietnam
- Myrmarachne smaragdina Ceccarelli, 2010 – Australia (Northern Territory, Queensland)
- Myrmarachne solitaria G. W. Peckham & E. G. Peckham, 1903 – Mozambique, South Africa, Lesotho
- Myrmarachne spissa (G. W. Peckham & E. G. Peckham, 1892) – India, Sri Lanka
- Myrmarachne striatipes (L. Koch, 1879) – Australia (New South Wales, Victoria, Tasmania)
- Myrmarachne tagalica Banks, 1930 – Philippines
- Myrmarachne tamsuiensis Yamasaki, 2013 – Taiwan
- Myrmarachne tayabasana Chamberlin, 1925 – Philippines
- Myrmarachne thaii Żabka, 1985 – Vietnam
- Myrmarachne tintinnabulum Yamasaki, 2018 – Malaysia (Borneo)
- Myrmarachne transversa (Mukerjee, 1930) – India
- Myrmarachne tristis (Simon, 1882) – Libya to India
- Myrmarachne uelensis Wanless, 1978 – DR Congo
- Myrmarachne uniseriata Narayan, 1915 – India, Sri Lanka
- Myrmarachne uvira Wanless, 1978 – Ethiopia, Ghana, Nigeria, DR Congo, Uganda, Kenya, Tanzania, Botswana
- Myrmarachne vanessae Wanless, 1978 – Ivory Coast, Tanzania, Mozambique
- Myrmarachne vehemens Fox, 1937 – China
- Myrmarachne vestita (Thorell, 1895) – Myanmar
- Myrmarachne vulgarisa Barrion & Litsinger, 1995 – Philippines
- Myrmarachne xingrenensis C. Wang, Mi & Peng, 2023 – China
- Myrmarachne yinae C. Wang, Mi & Peng, 2023 – China
- Myrmarachne zabkai Pekár, 2017 – Australia (Queensland, New South Wales)
