= Megaphragma caribea =

Scientific classification
- Kingdom: Animalia
- Phylum: Arthropoda
- Clade: Pancrustacea
- Class: Insecta
- Order: Hymenoptera
- Family: Trichogrammatidae
- Genus: Megaphragma
- Species: M. caribea

Binomial name
- Megaphragma caribea Delvare, 1993

Species of wasp

Megaphragma caribea is a species of wasp. It has been found acting as an egg parasitoid of Heliothrips haemorrhoidalis and Selenothrips rubrocinctus, which live on the plant Terminalia catappa in Colombia. It has a body length of only 181–224 μm, making it one of the smallest extant insects.

Before it emerges as an adult, a majority of the nuclei inside its neurones undergo lysis, leaving its central nervous system mostly anucleate. This has been observed to occur in other species within this genus.

== Miniaturisation ==
Like others in its genus, it is a parasitoid of thrips’ eggs, which can be around 0.2mm or smaller. To efficiently parasitise these microscopic eggs, it has to be as small as possible, resulting in extreme miniaturisation.

Optimisation for microscopic proportions is likely the reason it lacks neuronal nuclei in adulthood; When obeying Haller’s rule, as an organism gets smaller its brain must become proportionally larger in order to maintain proper functioning. To avoid this, it gets rid of less necessary structures to reduce the overall size of its nervous system whilst maintaining normal function. It loses around 95% of its neuronal nuclei and yet can still locomote and display complex behaviour, as its anucleate cells remain functional.
