= List of animals featuring external asymmetry =

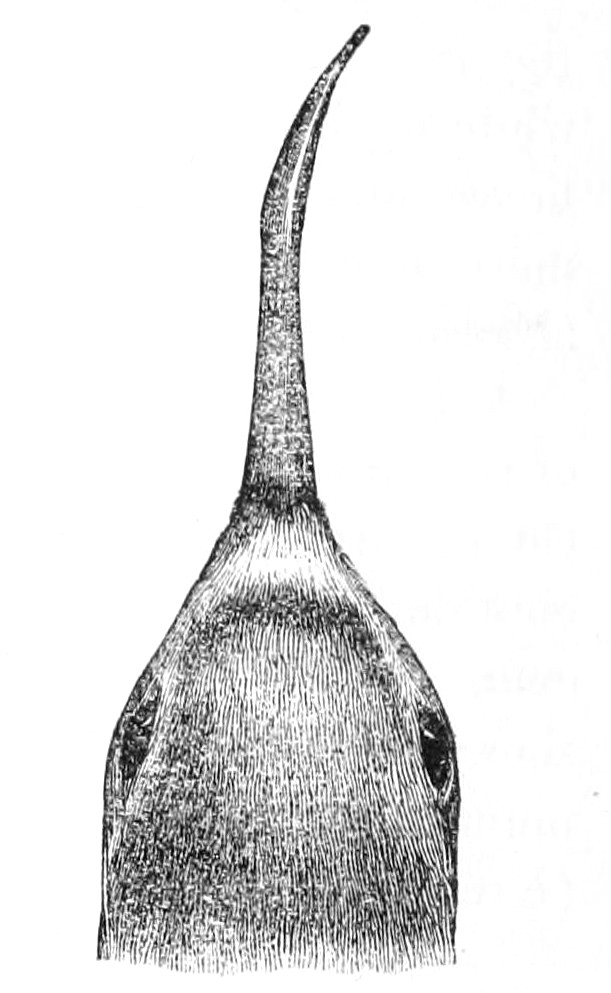
The beak of a wrybill is bent toward the right

This is a list of animals that markedly feature external asymmetry in some form. They are exceptions to the general pattern of symmetry in biology. In particular, these animals do not exhibit bilateral symmetry, which permits streamlining and is common in animals.

== Birds ==
The crossbill has an unusual beak in which the upper and lower tips cross each other.

The wrybill is the only species of bird with a beak that is bent sideways (always to the right).

Many owl species, such as the barn owl, have asymmetrically positioned ears that enhance sound positioning.

== Fish ==
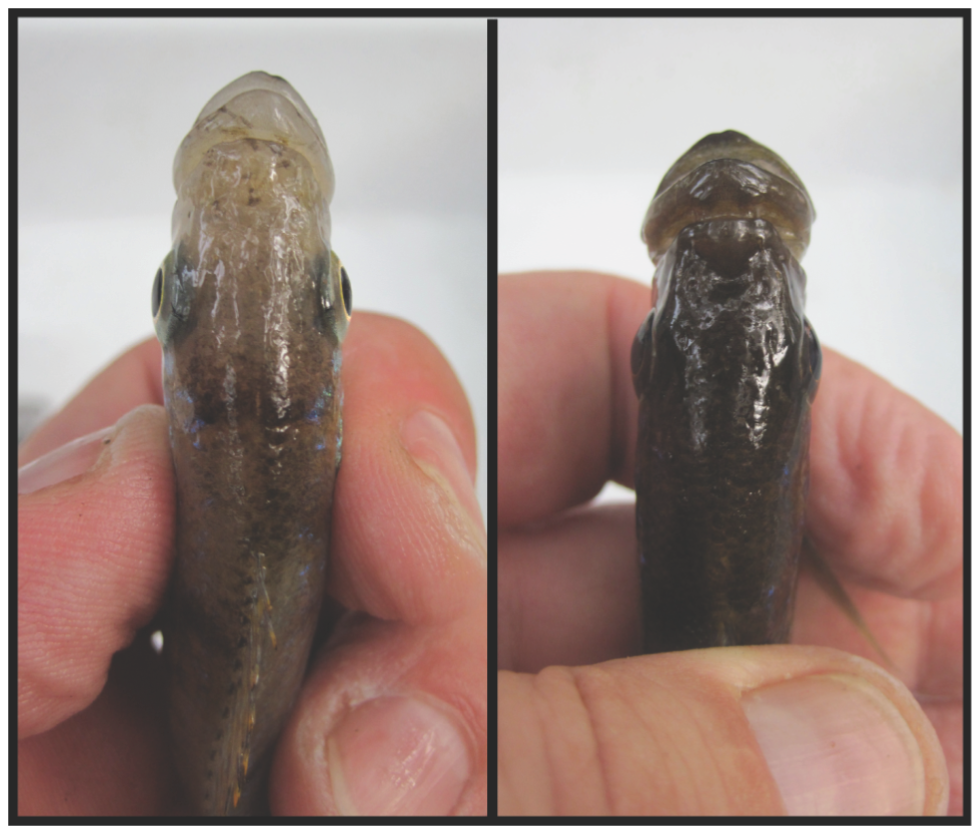
Fish: Dorsal view of right-bending (left) and left-bending (right) jaw morphs

Many flatfish, such as flounders, have eyes placed asymmetrically in the adult fish. The fish has the usual symmetrical body structure when it is young, but as it matures and moves to living close to the sea bed, the fish lies on its side, and the head twists so that both eyes are on the top.

The jaws of the scale-eating cichlid Perissodus microlepis occur in two distinct morphological forms. One morph has its jaw twisted to the left, allowing it to eat scales more readily on its victim's right flank. The other morph has its jaw twisted to the right, which makes it easier to eat scales on its victim's left flank. The relative abundance of the two morphs in populations is regulated by frequency-dependent selection.

== Mammals ==
The narwhal has a helical tusk on its upper left jaw. Odobenocetops, an extinct toothed whale, may have possessed similar asymmetrical dentition, though it differed from the narwhal in possessing two erupted, rear-facing tusks with the right significantly longer than the left.

The sperm whale (Physeter macrocephalus) has a single nostril on its upper left head. The right nostril forms a phonic lip. The source of the air forced through the phonic lips is the right nasal passage. While the left nasal passage opens to the blow hole, the right nasal passage has evolved to supply air to the phonic lips. It is thought that the nostrils of the land-based ancestor of the sperm whale migrated through evolution to their current functions, the left nostril becoming the blowhole and the right nostril becoming the phonic lips.

The fin whale (Balaenoptera physalus) has complex and asymmetrical coloration on its head, with the jaw dark grey on one side and white on the other.

The caribou or reindeer (Rangifer tarandus) has asymmetrical antlers. Adult males, in particular, usually possess one brow tine formed into a "shovel" shape. Suggestions for its function include eye protection during antler-threshing courtship displays or as an offensive weapon during the mating season.

Honey badgers of the subspecies signata have a second lower molar on the left side of their jaws, but not the right.

A 2019 study reported a systematic aurofacial asymmetry in humans, meaning that the face (eyes, nose and mouth) were displaced to the left with respect to the midplane between the ears. This appeared to decrease with age.

== Reptiles ==
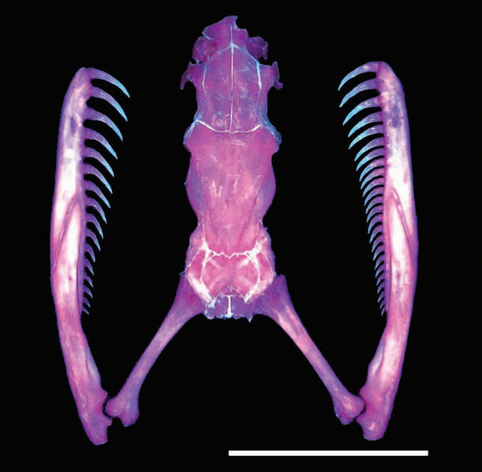
Skull of Pareas iwasakii

Iwasaki's snail-eater snake (Pareas iwasakii) is a snail-eating specialist; even newly hatched individuals feed on snails. It has asymmetric jaws, which facilitates feeding on snails with dextral (clockwise coiled) shells. A consequence of this asymmetry is that this snake is much less adept at preying on sinistral (counterclockwise coiled) snails.

== Invertebrates ==
Fiddler crabs and hermit crabs have one claw much larger than the other, which in hermit crabs is used as a makeshift "door" to block the opening of the shell when it retracts inside. If a male fiddler loses its large claw, it grows another on the opposite side after molting. A soft abdomen is also present in a hermit crab as an asymmetrical modification due to the asymmetrical nature of the snail shells they inhabit.

All gastropods are asymmetrical. This is easily seen in snails and sea snails, which have helical shells. At first glance slugs appear externally symmetrical, but their pneumostome (breathing hole) is always on the right side. The origin of asymmetry in gastropods is a subject of scientific debate. Other gastropods develop external asymmetry, such as Glaucus atlanticus that develops asymmetrical cerata as they mature.

Histioteuthis is a genus of squid, commonly known as the cock-eyed squid, because in all species the right eye is normal-sized, round, blue and sunken; whereas the left eye is at least twice the diameter of the right eye, tubular, yellow-green, faces upward, and bulges out of the head.

Sponges are asymmetrical.

Corals build colonies that are not symmetrical, but the individual polyps exhibit radial symmetry.

Alpheidae feature asymmetrical claws that lack pincers, the larger of which can grow on either side of the body, and if lost can develop on the opposite arm instead.

Certain polyopisthocotylean monogeneans are asymmetrical, as an adaptation to their attachment to the gill of their fish hosts.

Certain parasitic copepods that live inside the gill chamber of their fish hosts are asymmetrical.

Lobsters of the genera Homarus, Nephrops, and Homarinus have dimorphic claws, a crushing one and a cutting one.

Thrips have asymmetrical mouthparts, unique among insects.

== Gallery ==
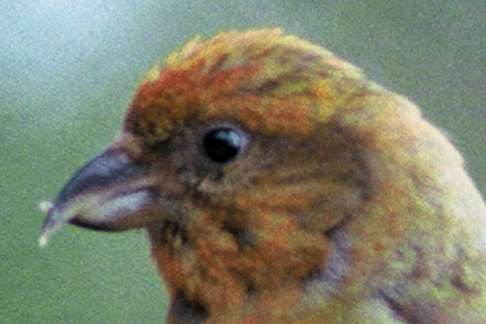
Head of a male crossbill

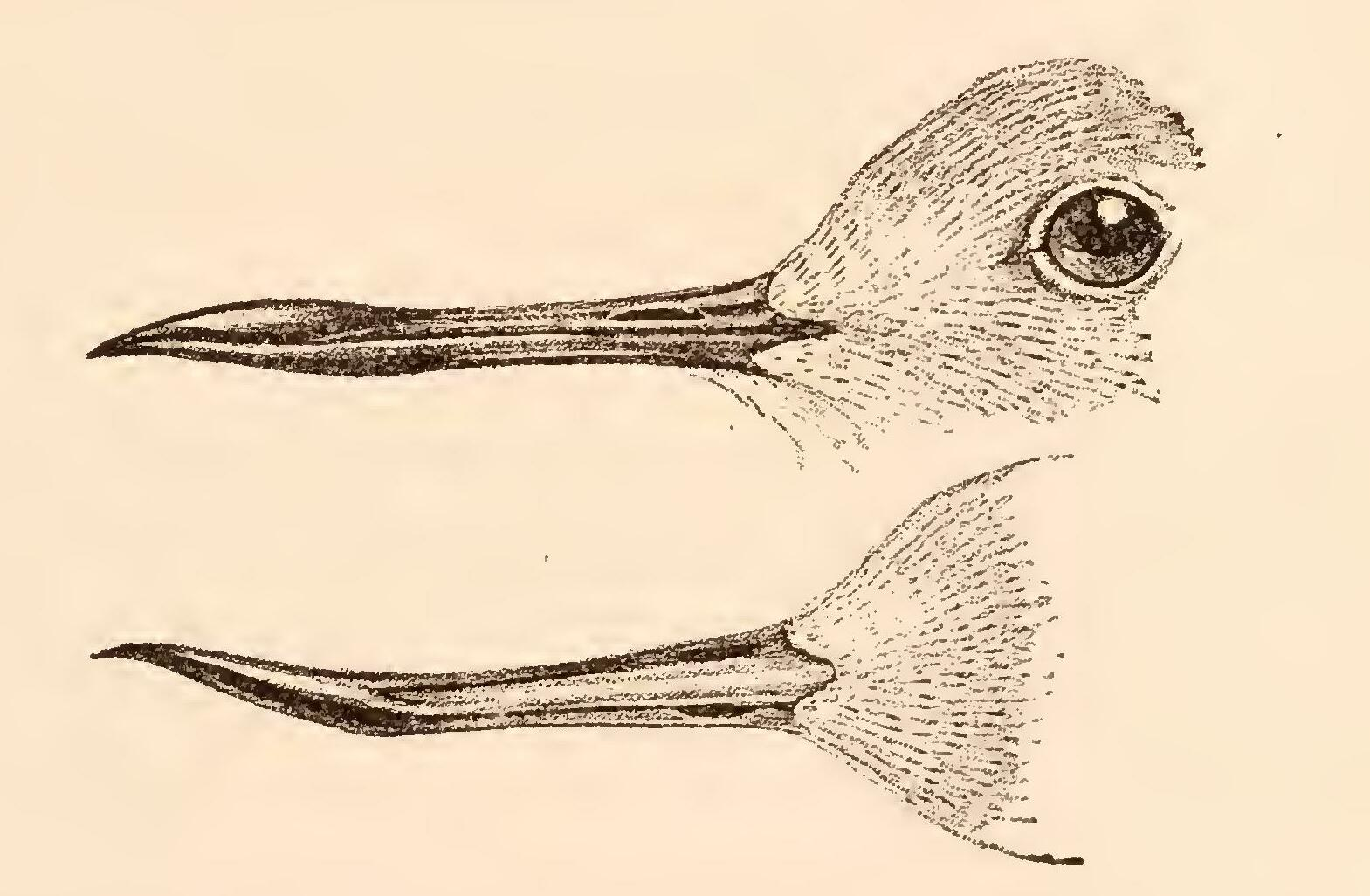
Side and top view of a wrybill's beak

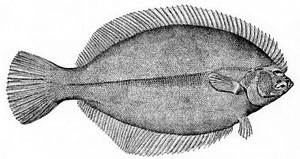
A winter flounder

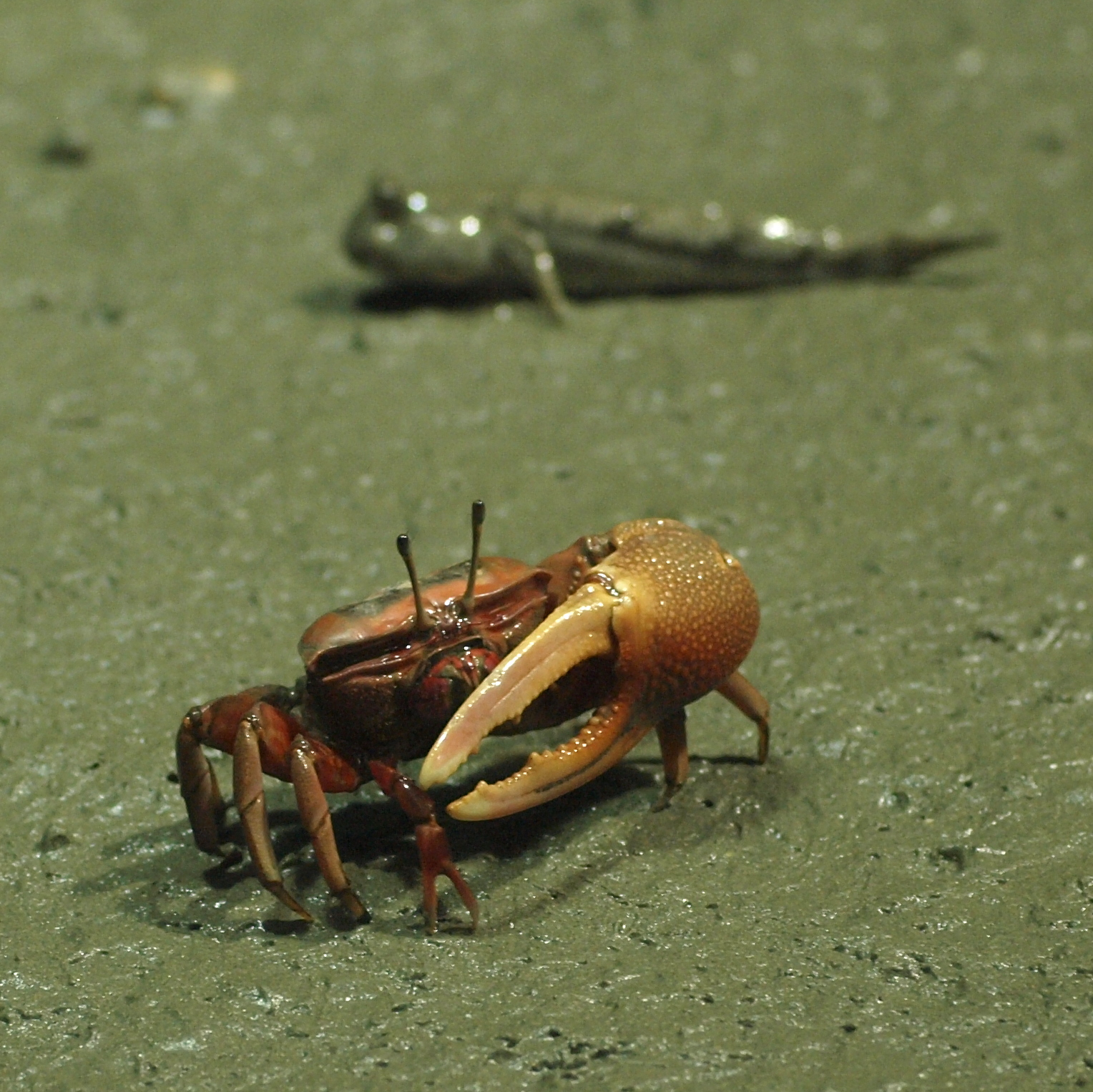
A fiddler crab

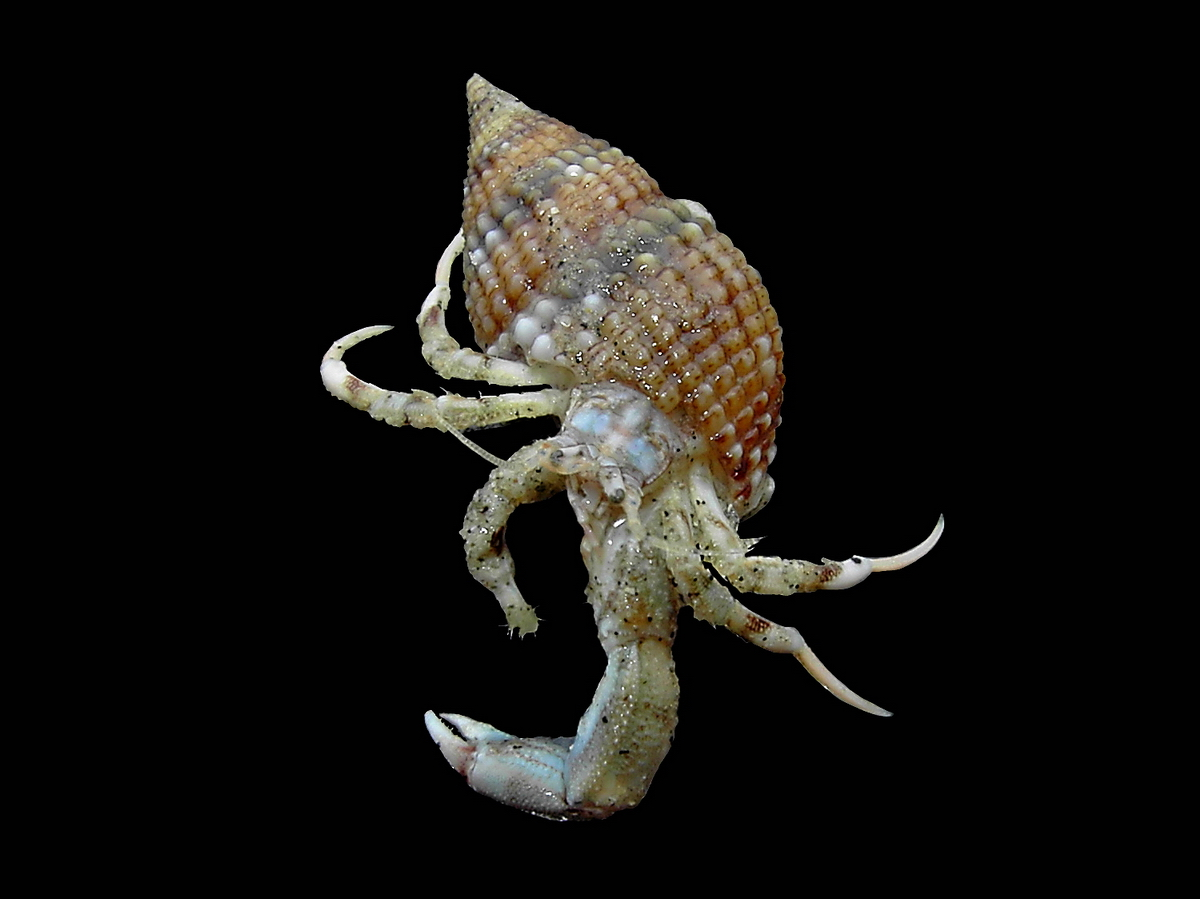
A hermit crabs different sized claws

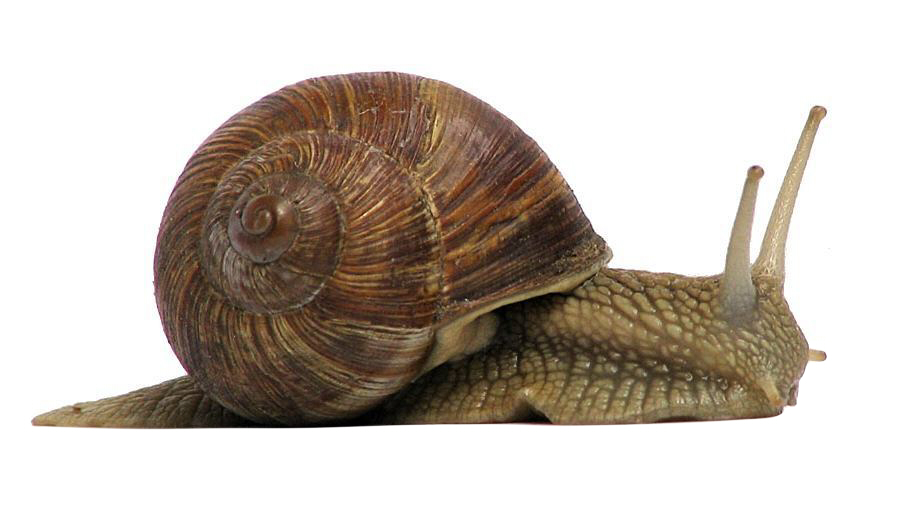
A Roman snail

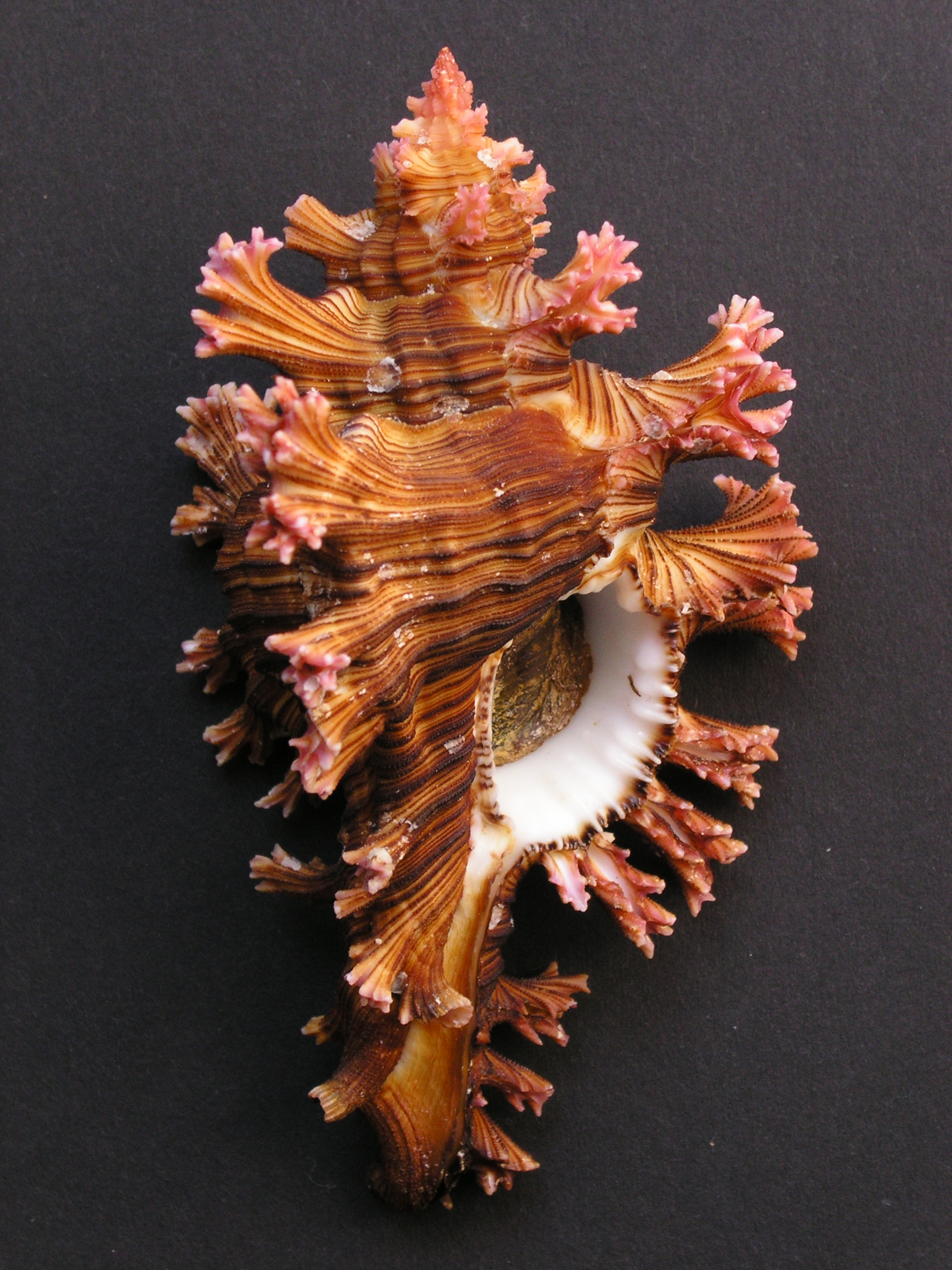
Chicoreus palmarosae, a sea snail

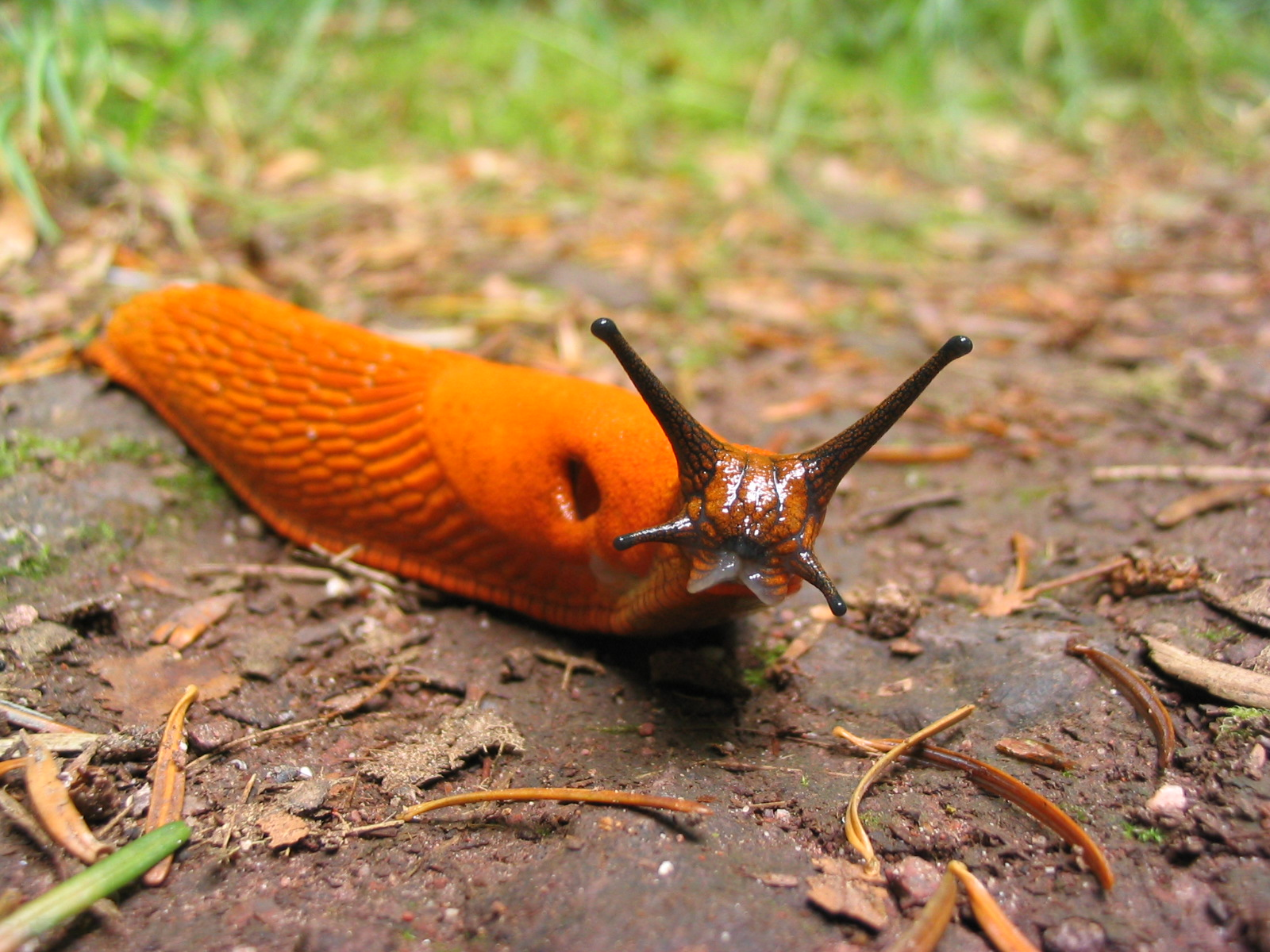
A red slug, clearly showing the pneumostome

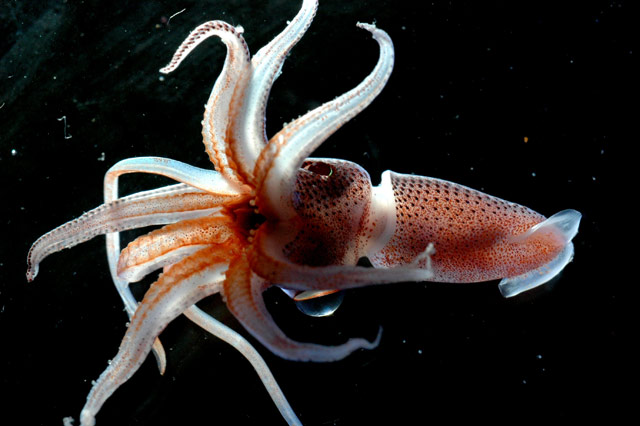
A cock-eyed squid with the bottom eye larger than the top

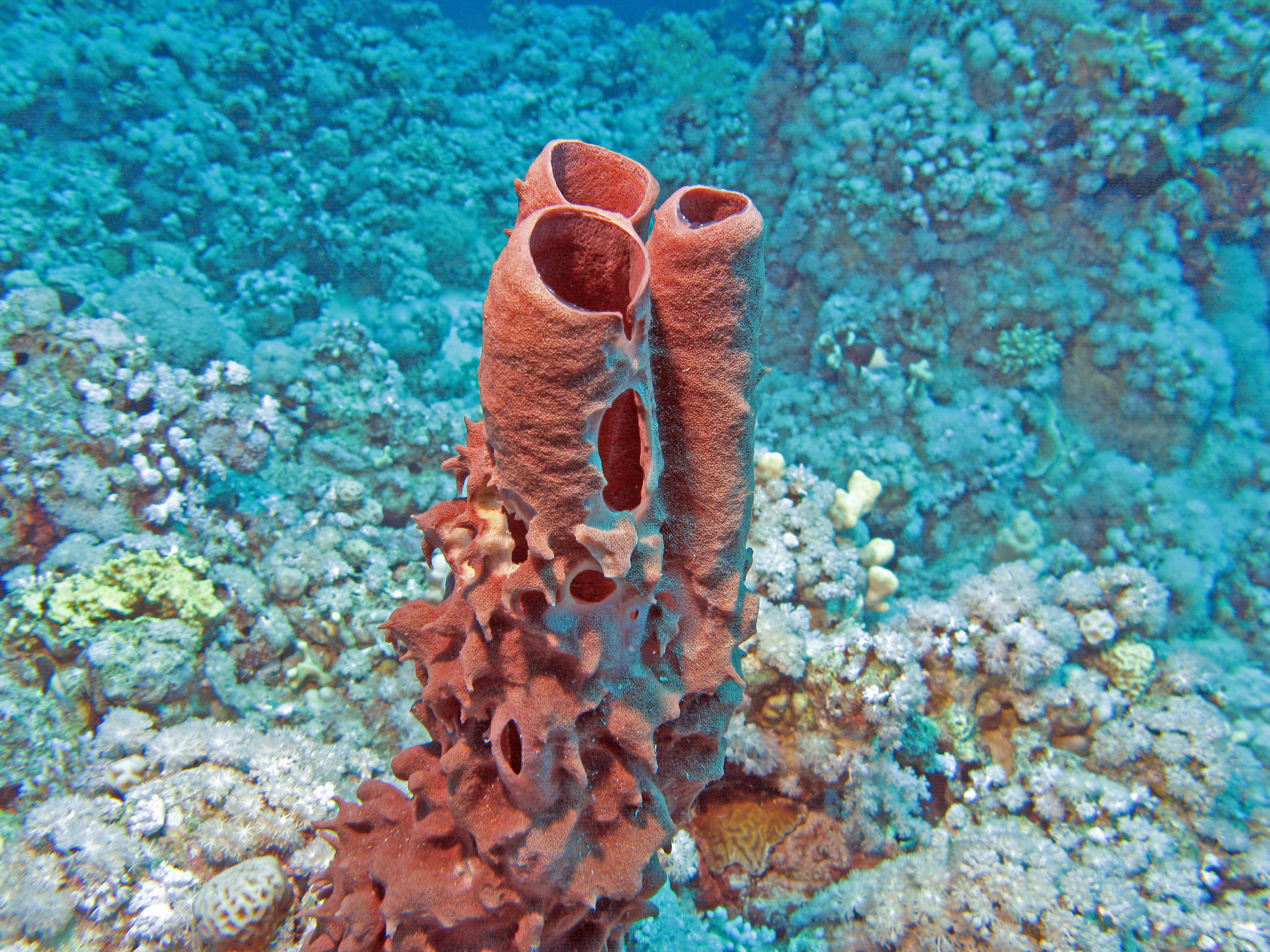
A sponge

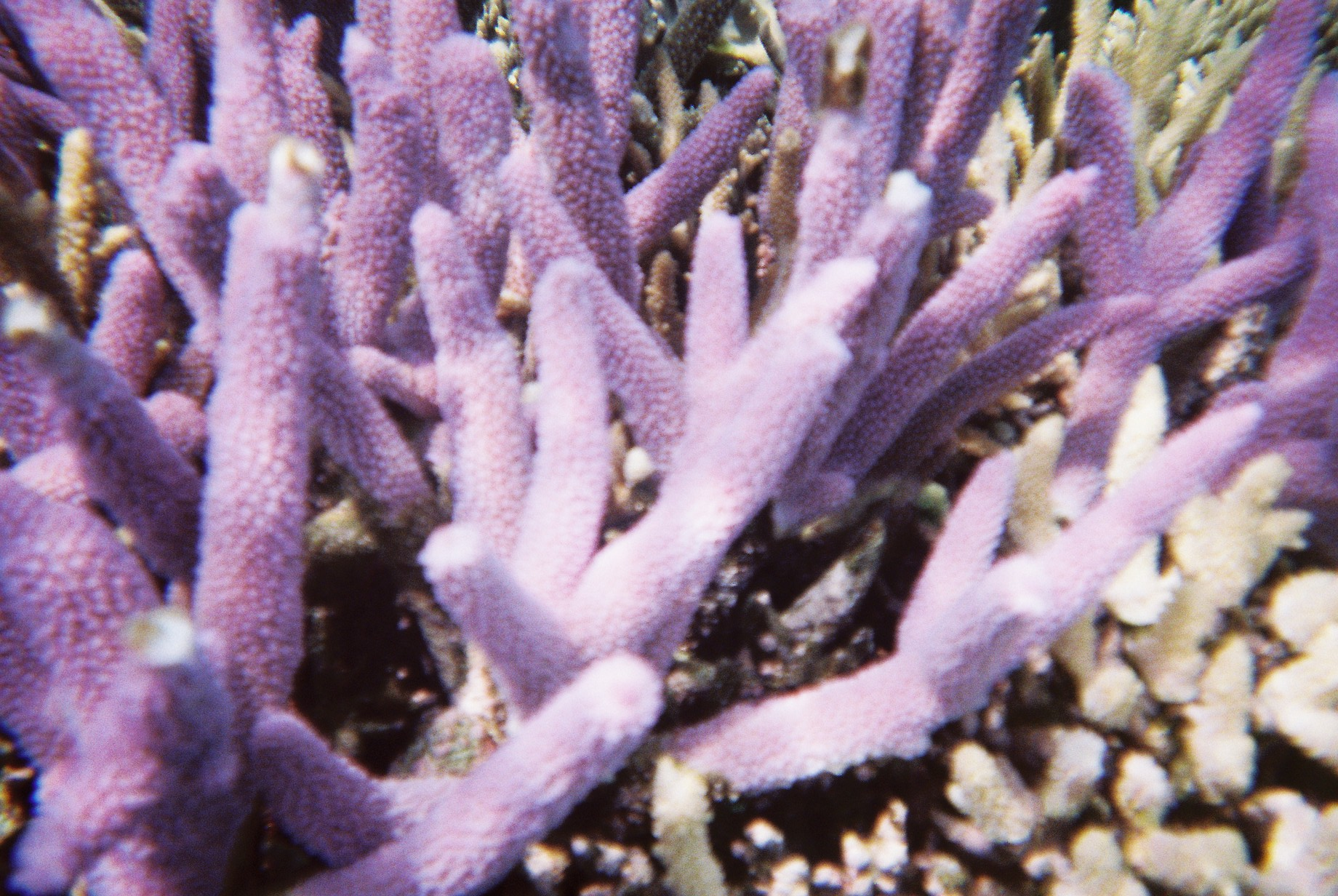
Coral

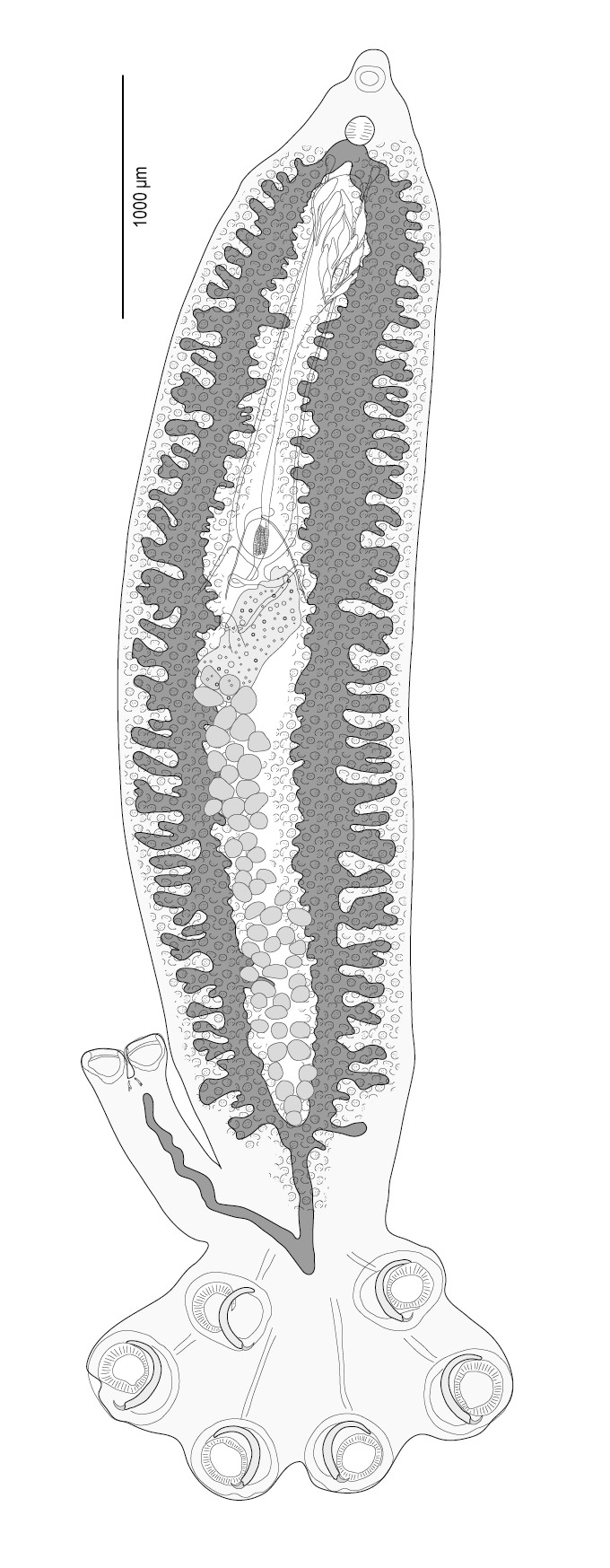
Protocotyle euzetmaillardi, a polyopisthocotylean monogenean

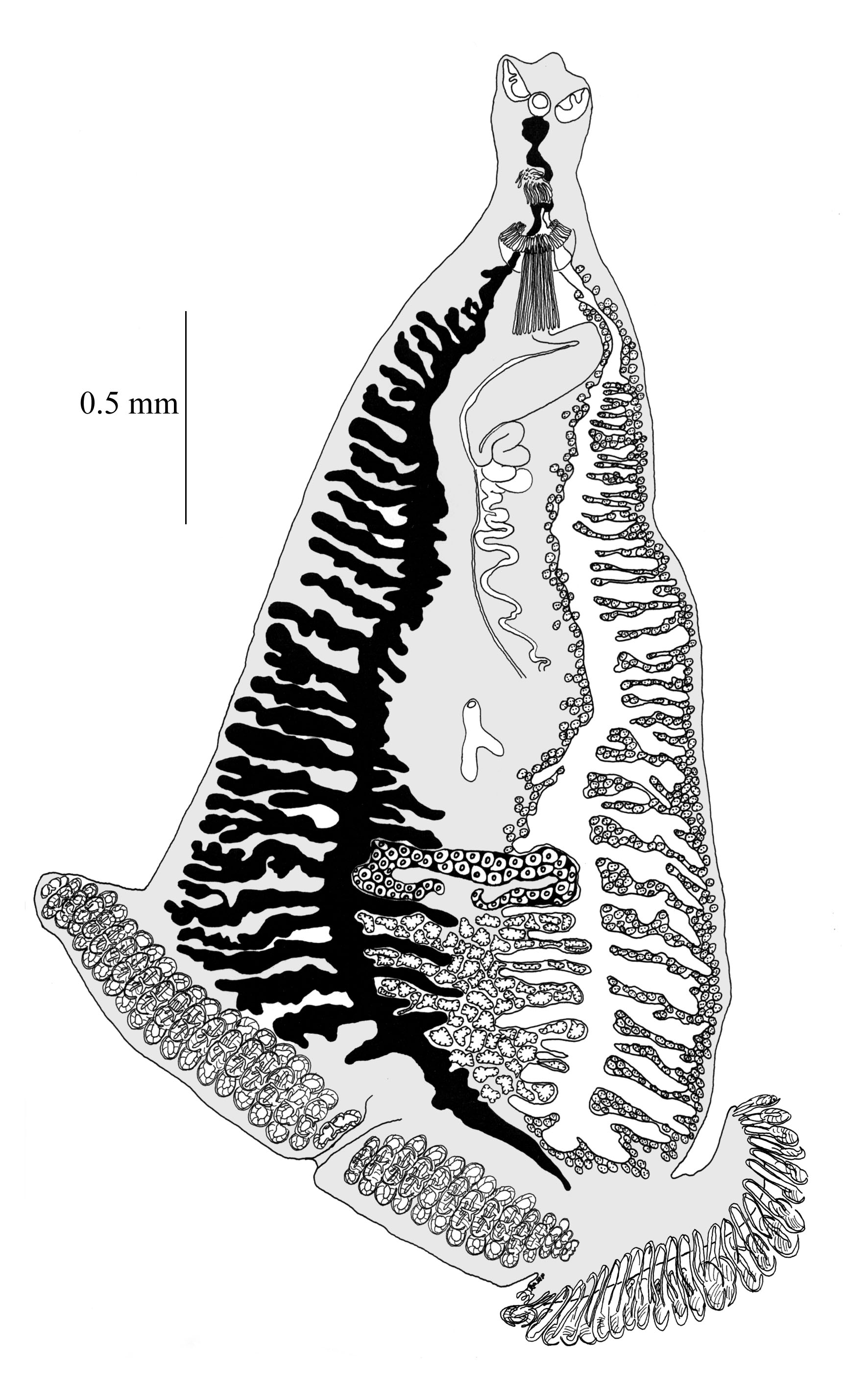
Heteromicrocotyloides megaspinosus, a polyopisthocotylean monogenean

Silhouettes of bodies of 8 species of polyopisthocotylean monogeneans, all asymmetrical

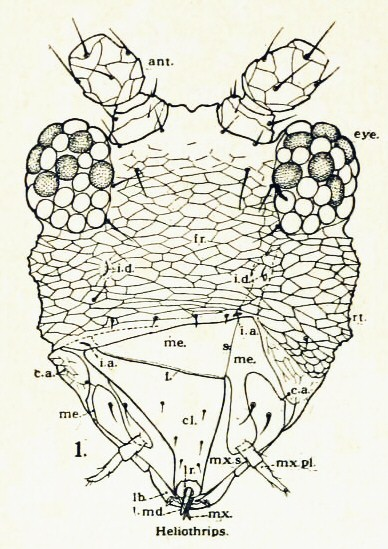
Asymmetric mouthparts of Heliothrips

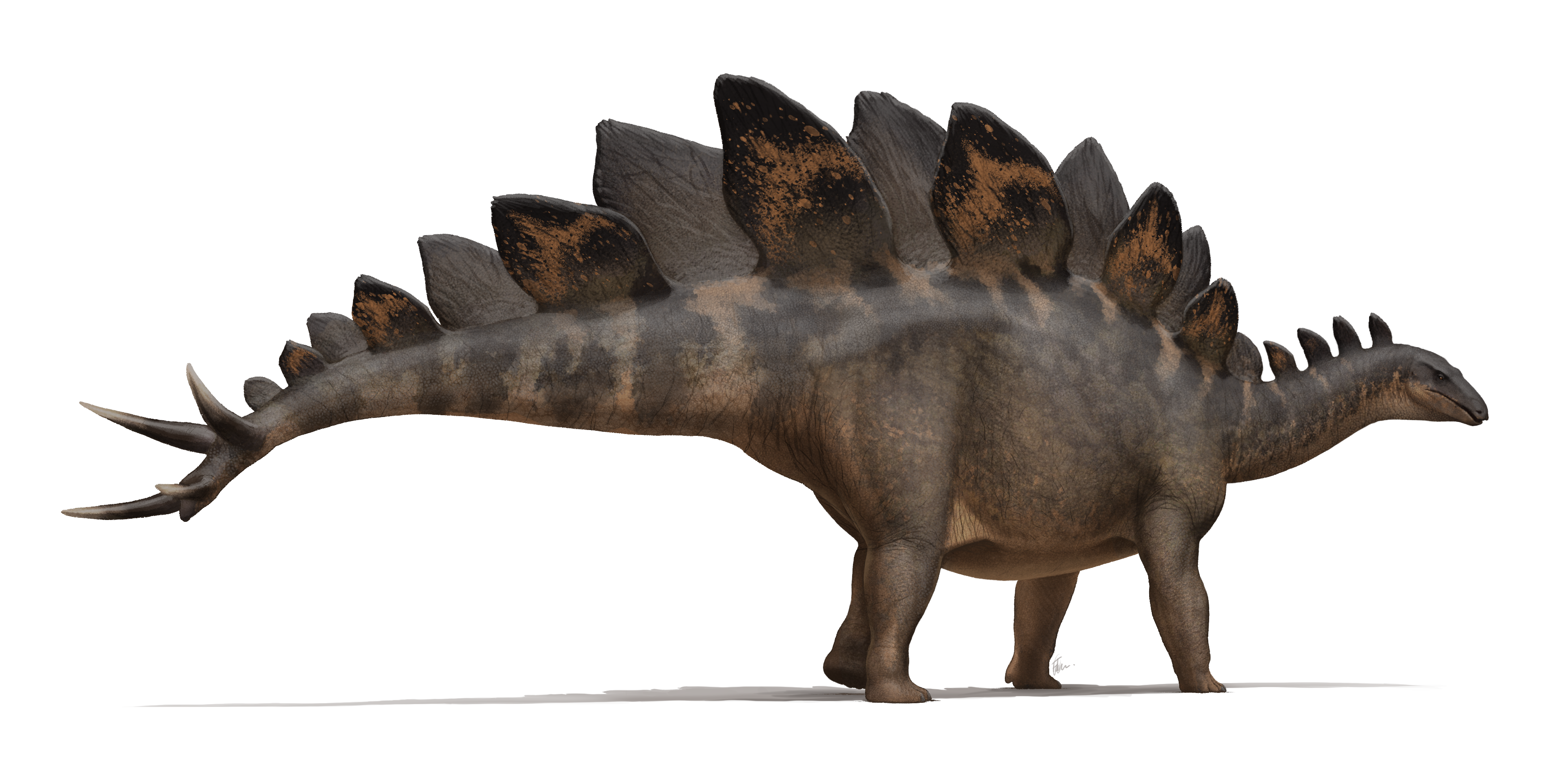
Plates of Stegosaurus stenops

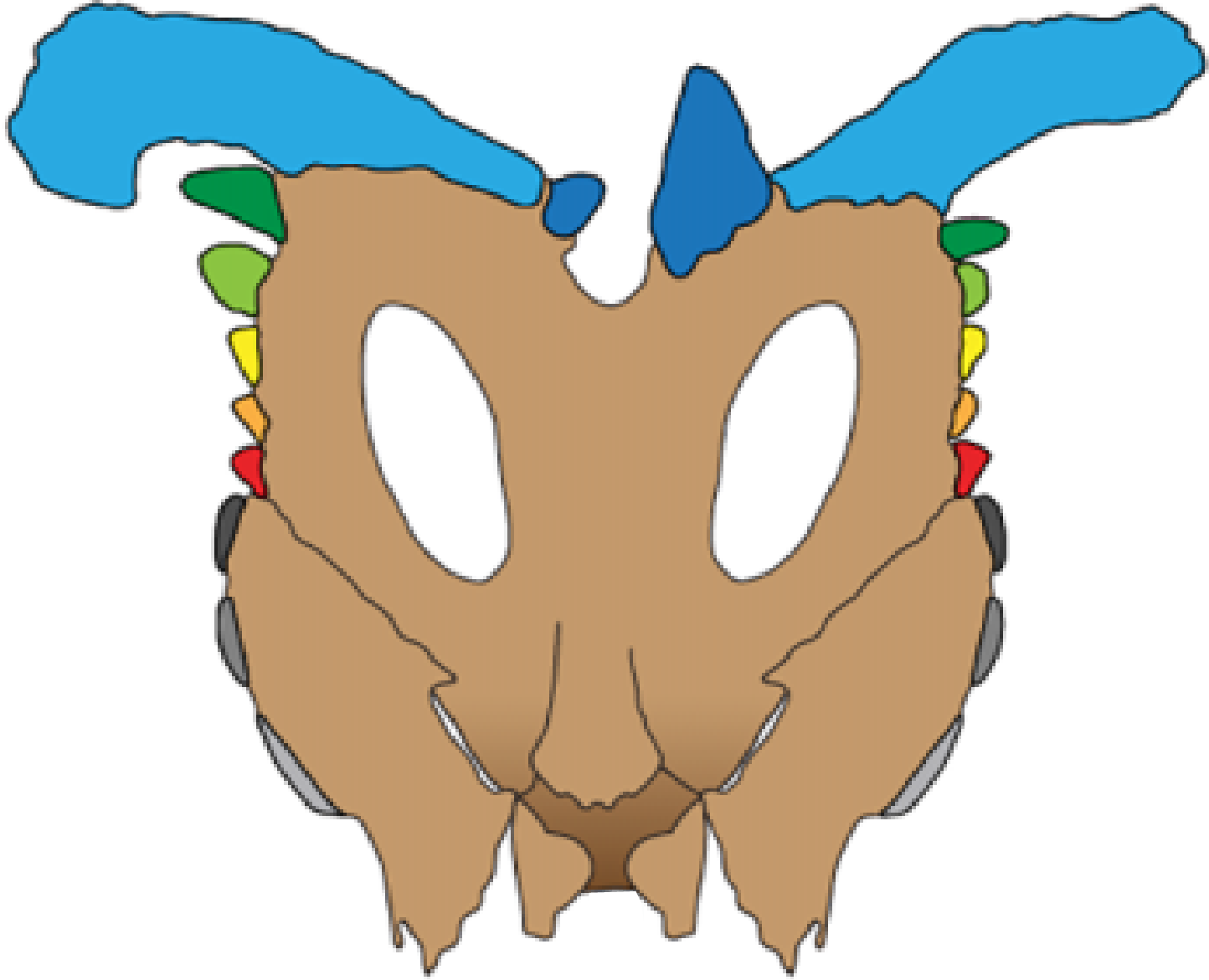
Frill of Lokiceratops rangiformis

Pistol shrimp

== See also ==
- Symmetry in biology
