= Prestwichia aquatica =

Scientific classification
- Kingdom: Animalia
- Phylum: Arthropoda
- Class: Insecta
- Order: Hymenoptera
- Family: Trichogrammatidae
- Genus: Prestwichia
- Species: P. aquatica

Binomial name
- Prestwichia aquatica Lubbock, 1864

Species of wasp

Prestwichia aquatica is a species of trichogrammatid wasp. They are aquatic, spending most of their adult lives entirely submerged in water. They parasitize eggs of aquatic beetles and damselflies.
