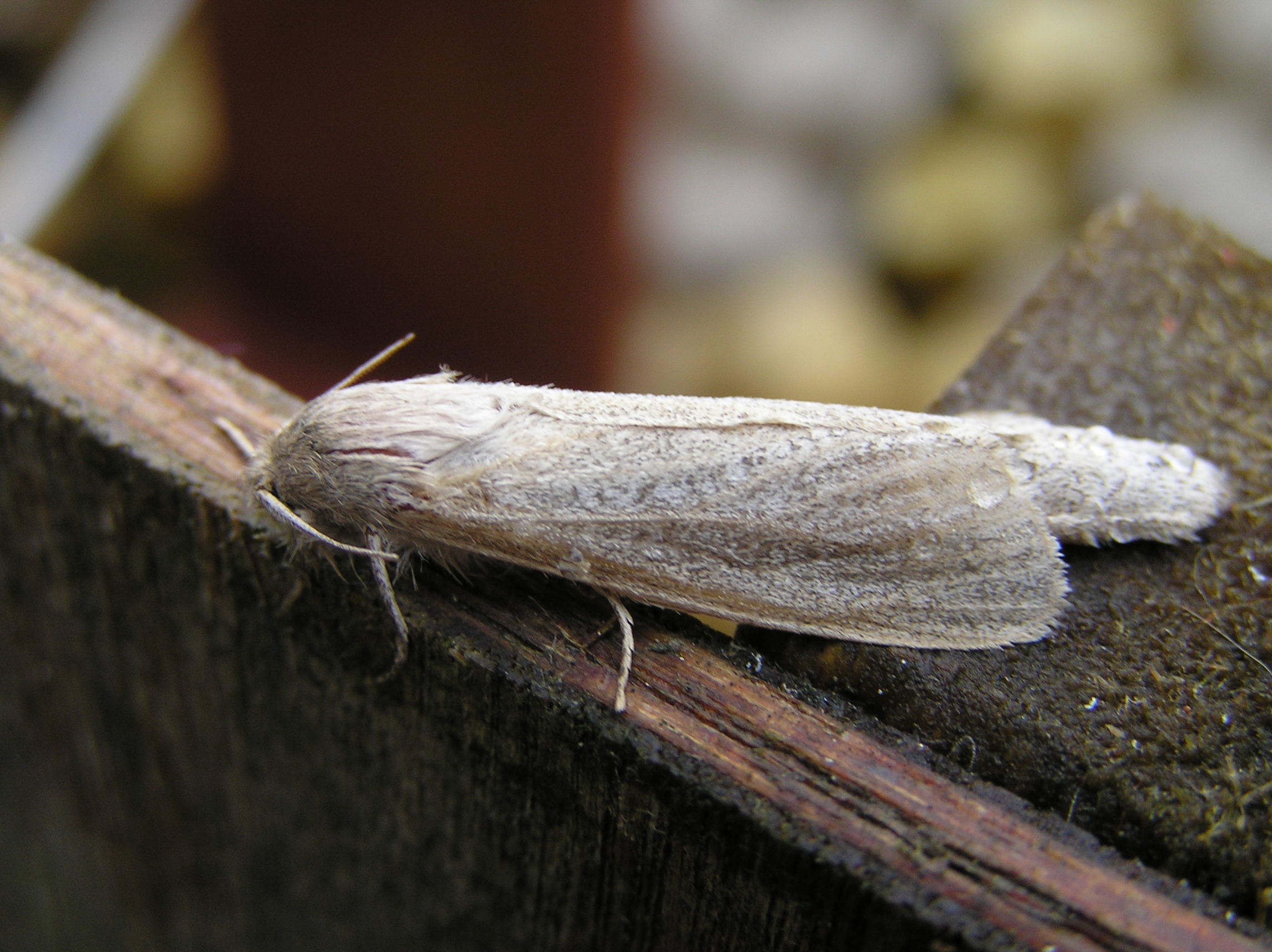

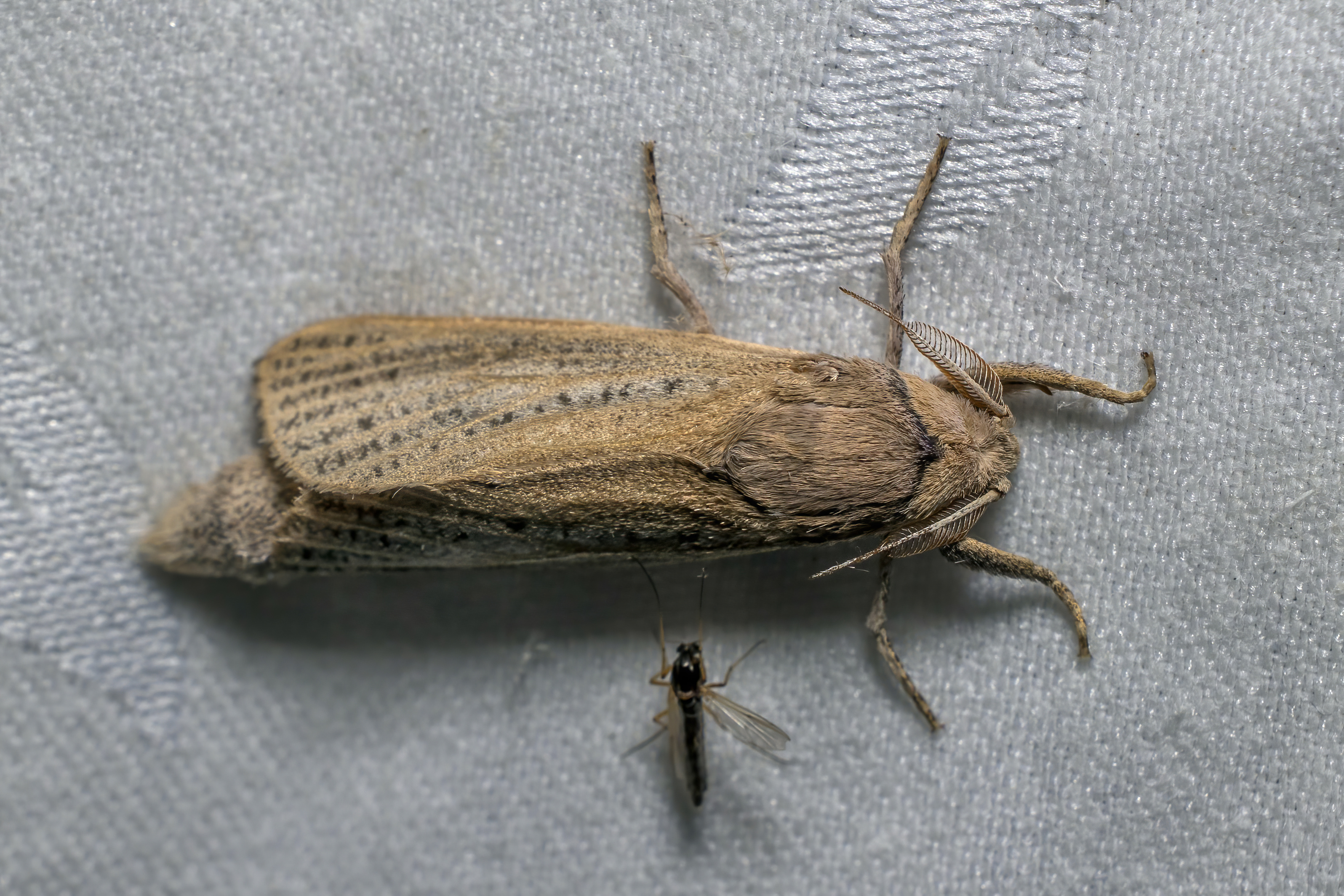

Scientific classification
- Kingdom: Animalia
- Phylum: Arthropoda
- Clade: Pancrustacea
- Class: Insecta
- Order: Lepidoptera
- Family: Cossidae
- Genus: Phragmataecia
- Species: P. castaneae

Binomial name
- Phragmataecia castaneae (Hübner, 1790)

Synonyms
- Phalaena castaneae Hübner, 1790; Phragmatoecia castanea Teich, 1884; Phragmataecia castanea sicca Dannehl, 1829; Phragmataecia castaneae f. fusca Lempke, 1961; Phragmataecia castaneae leonadae Gomez Bustillo, 1977; Phragmataecia meloina Gomez Bustillo & Fernandes-Rubio, 1976; Phragmataecia sica Gomez bustillo & Fernandes-Rubio, 1976; Phalena (Bombyx) arundinis Hubner, [1802-1805]; Phragmatoecia cinerea Teich, 1884

= Phragmataecia castaneae =

Reed leopard

Species of moth

Phragmataecia castaneae, the reed leopard or giant borer, is a moth of the family Cossidae. It was described by Jacob Hübner in 1790. It is found in central and southern Europe, the Middle East, the Caucasus, Transcaucasia, Turkmenistan, Kazakhstan, north-western Iran, Iraq, Syria, Sri Lanka, Madagascar, India, Lebanon, Turkey, western China, south-western Siberia, Egypt, Tunisia and Morocco.

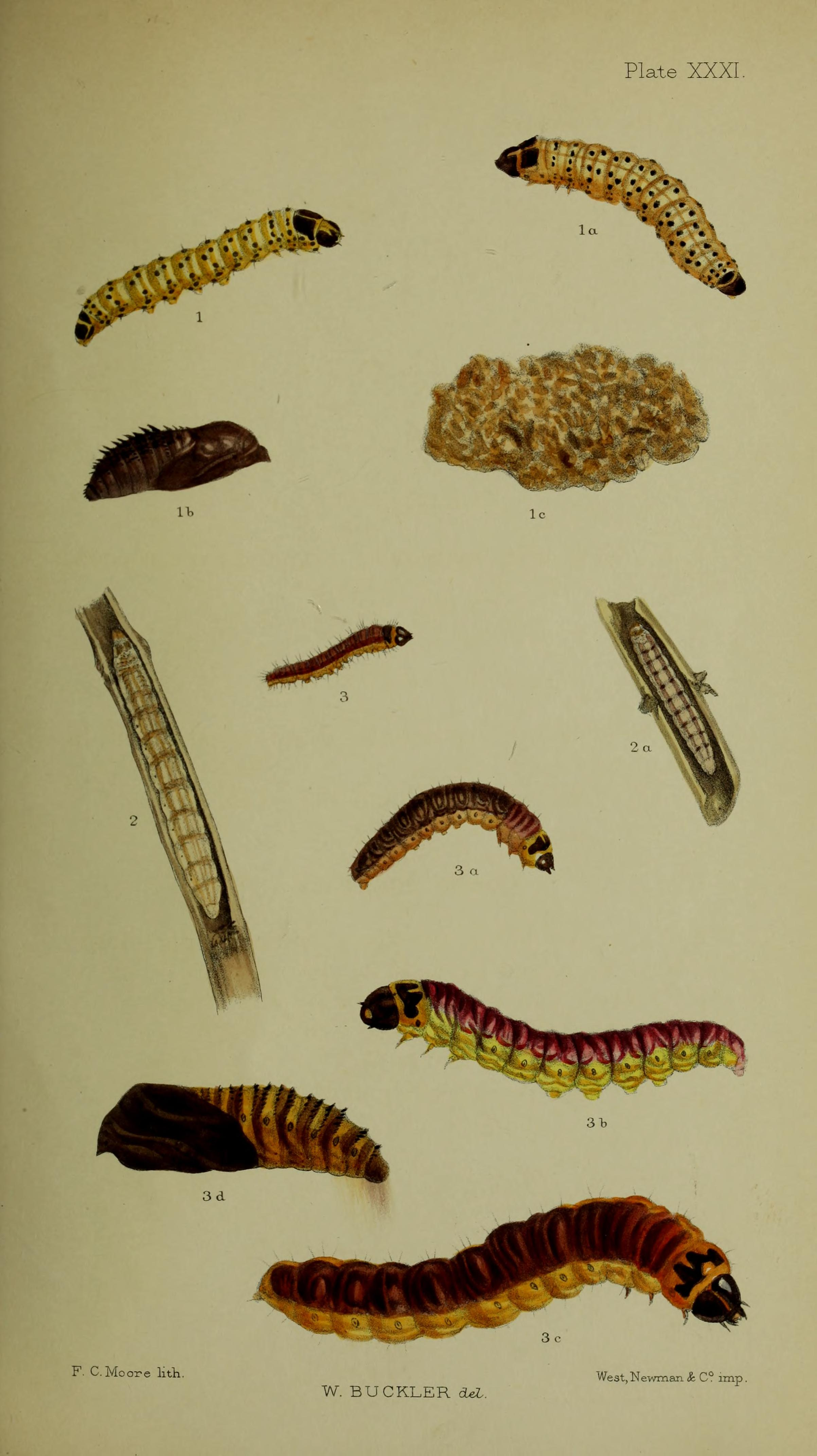
Figs. 2 a: larvae before last moult 2: larvae after last moult in stem of reed

== Description ==
As a genus, they lack palpi. Antennae of male bipectinated (comb like on both sides) to two-thirds of length where the braches are short. Legs are without spurs. Wings are long and narrow. The wingspan is 27–50 mm. Head, thorax and abdomen are brownish white. The female is larger than the male. The forewings are buffish grey with fine dark spotting. The female has a very long abdomen, which extends far beyond the wingtips at rest. Hindwings white or brownish white. In some specimens, the striations of the forewings are absent. The body of the larva is yellowish white with two purplish-brown lines on the back. Head is light brown.

== Ecology ==
The moth flies from May to July depending on the location. The larvae feed on Phragmites australis, Phragmites communis, Phragmites gigantea and Phragmites pumila. After larva hatching in summer, it feeds first in shoot tips. After two moults, larva enter a base internode. Larvae pupate after two years within shoots.

== As a pest ==
Larva severely devastate the shoot tips. The point it emerges is completely eaten first through and few internodes below the growing point are packed with frass, results so called "dead heart". Feeding on shoot bases by more developed larva is indistinct. Leaves may yellow and wilt from shoot base. They are known to attack Saccharum officinarum, Saccharum spontaneum and Sorghum propineum.

In control processes, seed cuttings are often treated with hot water at 50 °C for two hours. Dry leaves are removed before shipment when they moved to pest-free area. According to integrated pest management, pest resistant varieties are cultivated. In biological methods, Tumidiclava species can be introduced to the field, but it may be adapted to these predators.

== General references ==
- Skinner, Bernard (1984). Colour Identification Guide to Moths of the British Isles. Viking Press. p. 3. ISBN 0-670-80354-5.
- Waring, Paul; Martin Townsend (2003). Field Guide to the Moths of Great Britain and Ireland. British Wildlife Publishing. p. 22. ISBN 0-9531399-2-1.
