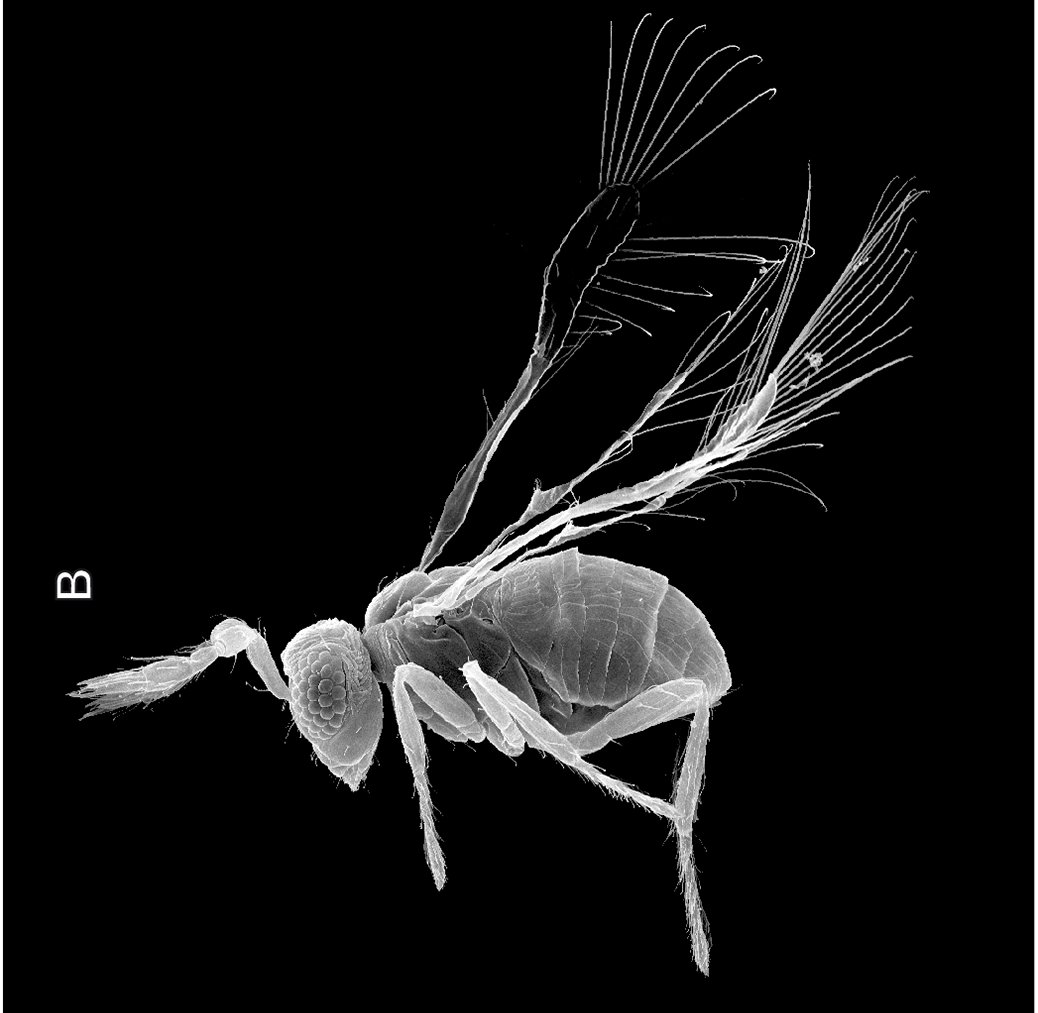

Scientific classification
- Kingdom: Animalia
- Phylum: Arthropoda
- Clade: Pancrustacea
- Class: Insecta
- Order: Hymenoptera
- Family: Trichogrammatidae
- Genus: Megaphragma
- Species: M. mymaripenne

Binomial name
- Megaphragma mymaripenne Timberlake, 1924

= Megaphragma mymaripenne =

Species of wasp

Megaphragma mymaripenne is a very small wasp. At 200 μm (1/5 mm; 1/125 inch) in length, it is the third-smallest extant insect, comparable in size to some single-celled organisms. It has a highly reduced nervous system, containing only 7,400 neurons, several orders of magnitude fewer than in larger insects (for example, a honey bee has about 850,000). This is the smallest number of neurons in all insects and flying animals. Its average lifespan in adulthood is 5 days.

== History ==
In January 1920, specimens of an unknown insect were collected in Hawaii associated with thrips, suspected of being egg parasites. The insects were described as a new species and genus Megaphragma mymaripenne 1924 by Philip Hunter Timberlake. M. mymaripenne specimens were next found on 29 March 1927, again with thrips, on the leaf of a genus Croton plant. On 10 May 1930, specimens were found near thrips and thrips eggs, and mature pupae were found inside the thrips eggs. As of 1930, the genus was not thought to be native to Hawaii.

== Anucleation ==
Nervous systems are one of the principal factors that limit shrinking body size. The entire central nervous system forms 6% of the body mass of M. mymaripenne, and the brain makes up 2.9%. Of the wasp's 7,400 neurons, 4,600 are located in the brain. A small insect from other families often deals with the issue of having a large brain in relation to its head size by shifting its brain into its thorax and even abdomen. However, wasps cannot, as to keep their heads flexible, the head's connection to the thorax is relatively limited.

Uniquely, by the time M. mymaripenne reaches adulthood, 95% of its nervous cells have lost their nuclei. Only 339–372 nuclei are found throughout the central nervous system, of which 179–253 are found in the brain. The nervous system of the pupae of M. mymaripenne makes up 19% of its body mass, 11% of which is the brain. Unlike in adults, cells in the pupae have nuclei. Only in the final stage of development do these undergo lysis, which greatly reduces the volume of the nervous system. While the brains of pupae are 93,600 μm^{3}, those of the adults are only 52,200 μm^{3}. Accompanying this shrinkage of brain volume is a shrinking of the occipital area of the head, with the cuticle folding into helical spirals. Researchers believe the wasp can survive without nuclei because of its short lifespan; the proteins manufactured during the pupal stage last the animal long enough to complete its life journey.

Despite their reduced nervous systems, adult wasps can fly, feed, and locate hosts to lay their eggs. The wasp eggs are deposited in the eggs of thrips. To emerge, the wasps cut an 80-90 μm near-circular hole in the eggs.

== Reproduction ==
M. mymaripenne usually reproduces asexually via parthenogenesis, resulting in the species being mostly female.

It is an egg parasitoid of thrips, with Heliothrips haemorrhoidalis being its most common host.
