= Thoreauia =

Scientific classification
- Kingdom: Animalia
- Phylum: Arthropoda
- Class: Insecta
- Order: Hymenoptera
- Family: Trichogrammatidae
- Genus: Thoreauia; Girault, 1916

Synonyms
- Austrobelia Girault, 1923; Austrobella Girault, 1923; Tennysoniana Girault, 1920

Genus of wasps

Thoreauia is a genus of wasps belonging to the family Trichogrammatidae.

Species:

- Thoreauia compressiventris Girault, 1916
- Thoreauia gargantua (Girault, 1923)
- Thoreauia gemma (Girault, 1920)
