= Heliothrips indicus =

Scientific classification
- Kingdom: Animalia
- Phylum: Arthropoda
- Class: Insecta
- Order: Thysanoptera
- Family: Thripidae
- Genus: Heliothrips
- Species: H. indicus

Binomial name
- Heliothrips indicus Bagnall, 1913

Species of thrips

Heliothrips indicus is a species of thrips. It is a pest of millets such as on finger millet, sorghum, and pearl millet in India.
