= Aphelinoidea =

Scientific classification
- Kingdom: Animalia
- Phylum: Arthropoda
- Class: Insecta
- Order: Hymenoptera
- Family: Trichogrammatidae
- Genus: Aphelinoidea; Girault, 1911

Synonyms
- Thalesanna Girault, 1938

Genus of wasps

Aphelinoidea is a genus of wasps belonging to the family Trichogrammatidae. It was described by A.A. Girault in 1911 in the Transactions of the American Entomological Society.

The genus has almost cosmopolitan distribution. Several species are egg parasitoids of leafhoppers (Hemiptera: Cicadellidae) and are of interest as biological control agents. In particular, species of Aphelinoidea parasitize eggs of the beet leafhopper, Circulifer tenellus (Baker), the sole North American vector of beet curly top virus, an economically important pathogen affecting tomatoes, sugar beets, peppers, spinach, and beans. Two species, A. anatolica and A. turanica, were introduced from Iran into California against the beet leafhopper and became established there.

== Description ==
The Aphelinoidea can by identified by the short venation and the presence of many discal setae in the wings. The funicle is absent and the long clava consists of 2 or 3 segments.

Aphelinoidea species reproduce by arrhenotoky: females are diploid and can produce female offspring only when mating occurs, while unmated females produce only males.

== Taxonomy ==
Aphelinoidea is a large and diverse genus. A revision of the Holarctic species was published by Trjapitzin in 1995. Subsequent morphological and molecular studies have described additional species and corrected earlier misidentifications. for example, indigenous populations in California and other arid western states long identified as A. plutella Girault were found to represent at least two distinct new species, A. zarehi and A. roja. DNA sequence analysis and cross-mating tests have confirmed species boundaries within the genus.

== Species ==
Species:

- Aphelinoidea accepta Girault, 1938
- Aphelinoidea anatolica Novicky, 1936
- Aphelinoidea bischoffi (Novicky, 1946)
- Aphelinoidea deserticola Novicky, 1936
- Aphelinoidea fasciativentris (Girault, 1915)
- Aphelinoidea gerlingi Triapitsyn, 2018
- Aphelinoidea habros (De Santis, 1957)
- Aphelinoidea howardii Girault, 1912
- Aphelinoidea huxleyi Girault, 1912
- Aphelinoidea hyacinthus Girault, 1938
- Aphelinoidea iucunda Girault, 1920
- Aphelinoidea laticlavia Fursov, 2007
- Aphelinoidea longiclavata Yousuf and Shafee, 1988
- Aphelinoidea longicorpus (Girault, 1913)
- Aphelinoidea mariana Doutt, 1955
- Aphelinoidea melanosoma Novicky, 1940
- Aphelinoidea neomexicana (Girault, 1915)
- Aphelinoidea nigrioculae Girault, 1920
- Aphelinoidea oblita De Santis, 1970
- Aphelinoidea oceanica Timberlake, 1926
- Aphelinoidea painei Girault, 1912
- Aphelinoidea plutella Girault, 1912
- Aphelinoidea redini (Girault, 1929)
- Aphelinoidea roja Triapitsyn, Walker and Bayoun, 2005
- Aphelinoidea sariq Triapitsyn and Rakitov, 2013
- Aphelinoidea semiflava De Santis, 1970
- Aphelinoidea semifuscipennis Girault, 1911
- Aphelinoidea shawanica Hu and Lin, 2005
- Aphelinoidea stepposa Fursov, 2007
- Aphelinoidea subexserta Nowicki, 1940
- Aphelinoidea tintinnabulum Girault, 1915
- Aphelinoidea totinigra Girault, 1930
- Aphelinoidea turanica S. Trjapitzin, 1995, (= A. scythica Fursov, synonymised by Rakitov & Triapitsyn, 2013)
- Aphelinoidea waterhousei (Blood and Kryger, 1928)
- Aphelinoidea weismanni Girault, 1912
- Aphelinoidea xenos Timberlake, 1924
- Aphelinoidea xiphias (De Santis, 1957)
- Aphelinoidea yousufi Khan and Anis, 2016
- Aphelinoidea zarehi Triapitsyn Walker and Bayoun, 2005
