= Thripobius =

Scientific classification
- Domain: Eukaryota
- Kingdom: Animalia
- Phylum: Arthropoda
- Class: Insecta
- Order: Hymenoptera
- Family: Eulophidae
- Subfamily: Entedoninae
- Genus: Thripobius; Ferrière, 1938

Type species
- Thripobius hirticornis Ferrière, 1938

Species
- Thripobius hirticornis Ferrière, 1938; Thripobius melikai Triapitsyn, 2005; Thripobius semiluteus Boucek, 1977

Genus of wasps

Thripobius is a genus of hymenopteran insects of the family Eulophidae.
