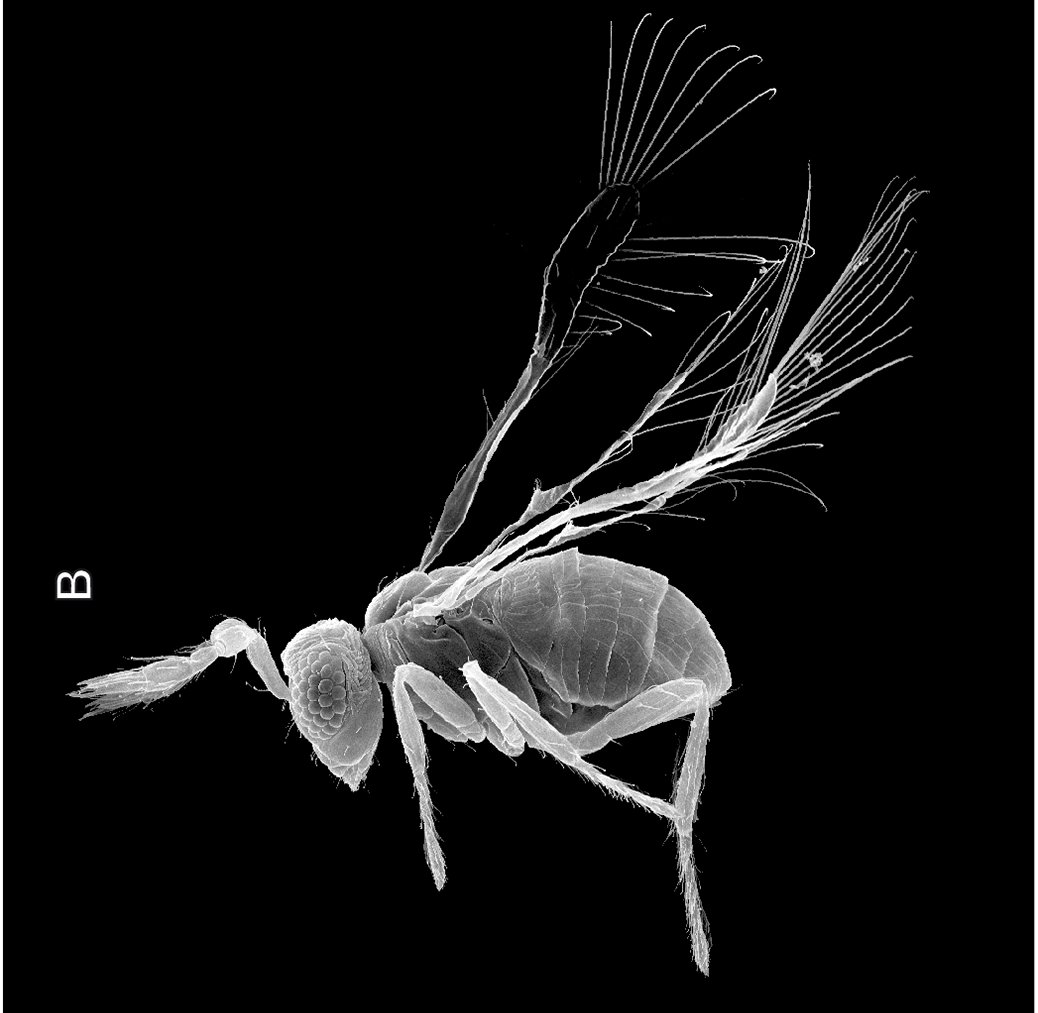
- Megaphragma mymaripenne

Scientific classification
- Kingdom: Animalia
- Phylum: Arthropoda
- Clade: Pancrustacea
- Class: Insecta
- Order: Hymenoptera
- Family: Trichogrammatidae
- Subfamily: Oligositinae
- Genus: Megaphragma; Timberlake, 1924

Type species
- Megaphragma mymaripenne Timberlake, 1924

Species
- See text

Synonyms
- Sethosiella Kryger, 1932; Paramegaphragma Lin, 1992

= Megaphragma =

Genus of wasps

Megaphragma is a genus of wasp in the family Trichogrammatidae. It contains some of the smallest known insects, Megaphragma caribea (170 μm) and Megaphragma mymaripenne (200 μm), which are roughly the same size as some unicellular protozoans.

== External morphology ==
The body is very compact, and its length can range from 0.16 to 0.3 mm. The mesosoma is rather high and is mostly shorter than the metasoma, and the prothorax is very short. The scutellum is shorter than the mid lobe of the mesoscutum, and has a pair of setae. The metathorax is slightly shorter than the propodeum. The propodeal spiracle is in an oval groove and near the internal margin with 2 very small setae. The legs are robust and have striate sculpture on the coxae.

=== Head ===
The head is hypognathous and rounded, being slightly flattened in the longitudinal direction antero-posteriorly, and with a slightly concave posterior surface. The head capsule has only 1 barely noticeable post-occipital ridge, and several folds near the base of the antennae, and other sutures are absent. The hypostome and clypeus aren't distinguishable from each other and hypostomal bridge is missing. The keyhole-shaped occipital foramen is small, and the tentorium has anterior and posterior arms, with the dorsal arms reduced in size. The tentorial bridge is present, but the laminatentoria are absent. The occipital area has many folds that reduce the skull's size from pupae to adults.

==== Eyes ====
Its compound eyes are lateral and consist of roughly 30 ommatidia and have 3 ocelli.

==== Antennae ====
The antennae are inserted at mid-level of the orbital line and are approximately 150 μm long. It has a short radicle, and the scape is usually elongate and slightly curved. The subcylindrical pedicel, small anellus and a single cylindrical funicular segment may be present or absent. The clava may consist of 1 to 3 segments. The antennal formula is 1 (scape),1 (pedicel), (1) (anellus), 1 (funicle), 2 (clava) or 1,1,(1),1,1 or 1,1,(1),0,3. Therefore, the antennae are 4 or 5 segmented, since the anellus isn't an antennomere. Multiporous placoid sensilla are absent in claval segment 1.

==== Mouth ====
The mouth consists of a labrum, well-developed mandibles, maxillae and labium. The labrum is weakly developed, and is represented by a small, triangular, membranous plate. The mandible consists of two small teeth and has an undulate (wavy) medial margin. It has spines on its internal surface and the mola are missing. The maxillae are combined with the labium by a membranous septum into a labiomaxillary structure. The maxillae consist of a small, triangular cardo, broad fusiform stipes, largely fused endite lobes, and palp. The maxillary palp is very small and consists of only one segment. The labium consists of an almost triangular prementum, which has single-segmented, vestigial palps on the lateral margin, and membranous ligula on the apex. The galea has large setae and spines on it, and the lacinia is recognizable as a brush of setae.

=== Mesosoma ===
==== Prothorax ====
The prothorax is narrow, and consists of a semicircular pronotum and propectus. It is formed by the sternite and pleurite of the thorax. The anterior part of the propectus bears paired cervical processes, which the head articulates to. The profurca is Y-shaped and has flattened arms. The pleurite bears a well-developed propleural arm.

==== Mesothorax ====
The mesothorax is larger than the other metasomal segments. The mesonotum consists of 2 parts which are divided by the scuto-scutellar suture. The anterior part is divided into the mesoscutum and scapulae by longitudinal parapsidal striae, while the posterior side is divided into the axillae and scutellum. The lateral part is divided into the episternum and epimeron by a slight ridge. The prepectus is between the prothorax and mesothorax, along with a pair of annular, uniforous spiracles. The mesofurca is V-shaped, and its lateral arms are well-developed. The posterior margin of mesonotum forms the mesophargma, which is very long and almost reaches the tip of the metasoma.

==== Metathorax ====
The metathorax consists of only a narrow and circular metanotum, since the other sclerites are fused with the first abdominal segment, forming the propodeum. The propodeum bears a pair of spiracles, and is separated by a slight suture from the metepisterna. The epimera is also fused with the propodeum. The pleural apodeme is well-developed and is shaped like a longitudinal ridge with its top flattened. The metafurca are missing.

==== Wings ====
The wings are narrow and have strongly depleted venation. The blade has a fringe of long setae on its perimeter.

The forewing is very narrow compared to the other Trichogrammatidae, and is 5.3 to 10 times as long as the maximum discal width. There are three veins that are present in the forewing, the submarginal, marginal and stigmal veins. The veins are usually fused into an arch at the anterior wing margin, which is formed from the fusion of the subcosta and radius. The submarginal vein is short, and the costa cell and parastigma are not distinct. The marginal vein is very long, with one short seta at the base, and 1 or 2 central setae, which may be of very different lengths. The stigmal vein is very short, with 1 or 2 short setae on the stigma. The disc is either glabrous or has a few setae in 1 or 2 rows.

The hindwing is narrower than the forewing, and consists of only 1 vein. A discal fringe is absent in the front margin of the hindwing.

==== Legs ====
The legs are slender and ambulatorial, and consist of a coxa, two-segmented trochanter, femur, tibia and three-segmented tarsi. The apical tarsomere has 2 claws, and a well-developed arolium.

=== Metasoma ===
The metasoma and mesosoma are broadly joined, and the petiole is indistinct. The metasoma consist of six visible tergites, and the sternites are slight and unsclerotized.

=== Sexual dimorphism ===
In males, the post-anellar antennomeres are shaped differently, being generally more elongate than in the female; notably in the polychaetum-group. Their genitalia are proportional to their overall size, simple and tubular.

== Internal morphology ==
The head for the most part is filled by the brain and the subesophageal complex. A sizable portion of the metasoma is occupied by muscles, and a very large muscle fills up a lot of the mesosoma and metasoma. The reproductive system occupies a majority of the mesosoma.

=== Brain ===
Despite being one of the smallest flying insects (~200μm long), Megaphragma accomplish many complex behaviors such as flying, egg-host detection and oviposition. This is all performed within the nervous system and specifically the brain. Due to advancements in volumetric electron microscopy, there are now multiple connectomes of the brain including one of the entire head. The brain contains roughly 8,600 cells. Interestingly, about 97% of head neurons in Megaphragma do not have a nucleus after metamorphosis is completed. This neural denucleation is thought to be an evolutionary adaptation to the size constraints of the organism.

=== Integument ===
The integument consists of the cuticle, hypoderm and the basal membrane. The cuticle is 0.7 to 2.4 μm thick in M. Mymaripenne, with the thinnest integument being in the area between sclerites, and the thickest on the notal part of the mesosoma, and the posterior side of the head. The cuticle consists of an epicuticle and a procuticle which is homogenous. The hypoderm is made up of flattened cells which are up to 1.5 μm thick. Many hypodermal areas, especially in the head, have multiple electron transparent vacuoles.

=== Digestive system ===
The digestive system is very generalized, and is divided into 3 segments, the foregut, midgut and hindgut. The foregut and hindgut have a thin cuticular lining to them. The entire gut's length is slightly longer than the body, as it is looped in the metasoma. Salivary glands are missing.

== Distribution ==
The Megaphragma have a cosmopolitan distribution.

== Diet ==
All species parasitize thrips eggs, which is the primary reason for their small size. As such, they are potential biological control agents for thrips.

== Taxonomy ==
The closest relatives to Megaphragma appear to be Prestwichia and Sinepalpigramma.

=== Subtaxa ===
Megaphragma consists of 32 species in 7 groups:

- Megaphragma mymaripenne-group
  - Megaphragma funiculatum Polaszek and Fusu, 2022
  - Megaphragma mymaripenne Timberlake, 1924
  - Megaphragma nowickii Polaszek, Fusu, and Viggiani, 2022
  - Megaphragma noyesi Polaszek and Fusu, 2022
  - Megaphragma polilovi Polaszek, Fusu, and Viggiani, 2022
- Megaphragma longiciliatum-group
  - Megaphragma longiciliatum Subba Rao, 1969
  - Megaphragma fanenitrakely Polaszek and Fusu, 2022
  - Megaphragma priesneri Kryger, 1932
  - Megaphragma viggianii Polaszek, Fusu, and Polilov, 2022
- Megaphragma polychaetum-group
  - Megaphragma cockerilli Polaszek and Fusu, 2022
  - Megaphragma giraulti Polaszek and Fusu, 2022
  - Megaphragma polychaetum Lin, 1992
  - Megaphragma kinuthiae Polaszek, Fusu, and Viggiani, 2022
- Megaphragma ghesquierei-group
  - Megaphragma breviclavum
  - Megaphragma chienleei
  - Megaphragma deflectum Lin, 1992
  - Megaphragma digitatum
  - Megaphragma ghesquierei Ghesquière, 1939
  - Megaphragma hansoni
  - Megaphragma liui
  - Megaphragma pintoi Viggiani, 2022
  - Megaphragma rivelloi
  - Megaphragma striatum Viggiani, 1997
  - Megaphragma tamoi Polaszek, Fusu, and Viggiani, 2022
  - Megaphragma tridens Polaszek and Fusu, 2022
  - Megaphragma vanlentereni Polaszek and Fusu, 2022
- Megaphragma stenopterum-group
  - Megaphragma stenopterum Lin, 1992
- Megaphragma antecessor-group
  - Megaphragma antecessor Polaszek and Fusu, 2022
  - Megaphragma momookherjeeae Polaszek and Fusu, 2022
  - Megaphragma uniclavum Polaszek and Fusu, 2022
- Megaphragma macrostigmum-group
  - Megaphragma caribea Delvare, 1993
  - Megaphragma macrostigmum Lin, 1992

== See also ==
- Smallest organisms
