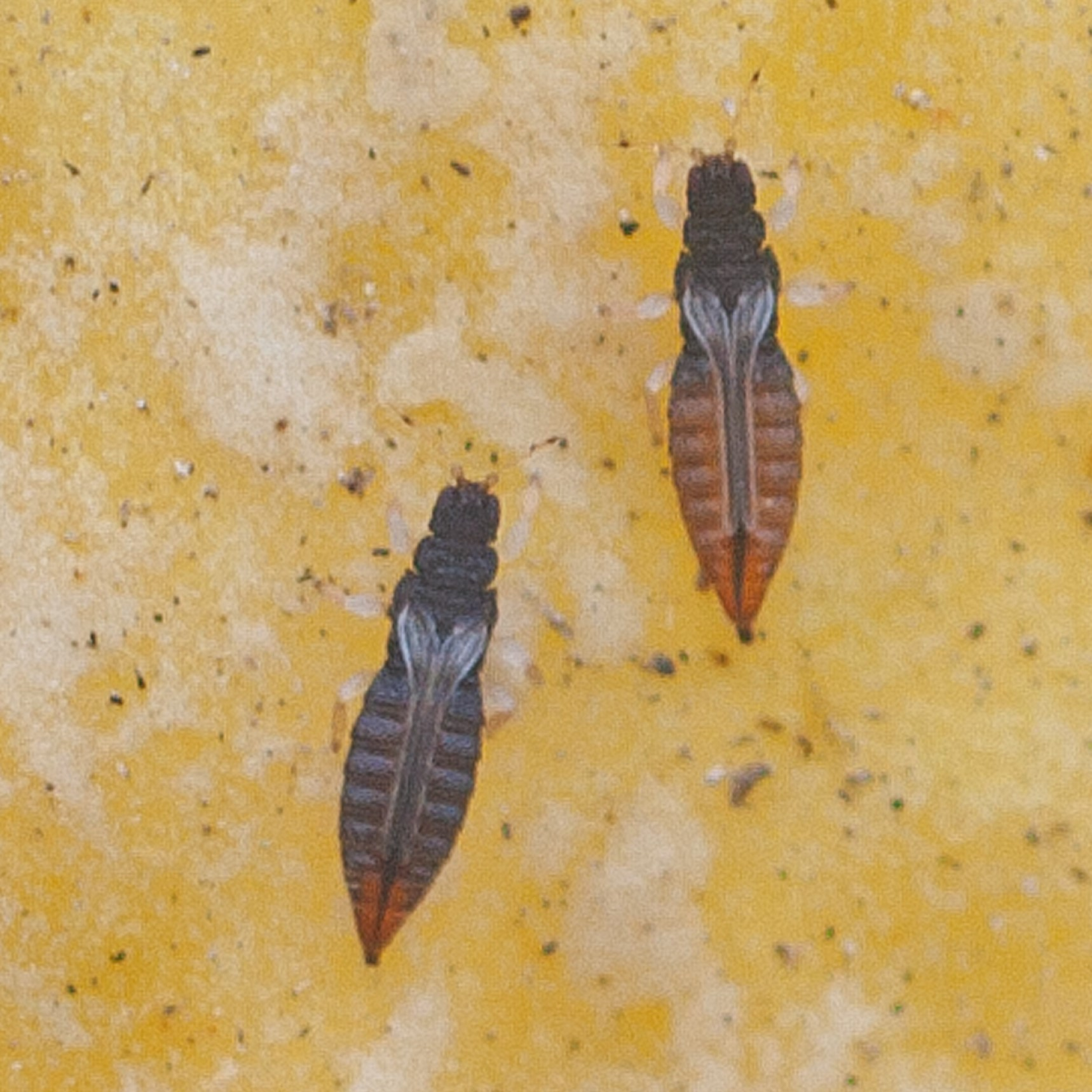

Scientific classification
- Kingdom: Animalia
- Phylum: Arthropoda
- Clade: Pancrustacea
- Class: Insecta
- Order: Thysanoptera
- Family: Thripidae
- Genus: Heliothrips
- Species: H. haemorrhoidalis

Binomial name
- Heliothrips haemorrhoidalis (Bouché, 1833)

= Heliothrips haemorrhoidalis =

Species of thrip

Heliothrips haemorrhoidalis is a species of thrips in the family Thripidae. It is most commonly known as the greenhouse thrips, the glasshouse thrip or black tea thrips. This species of thrips was first described in 1833 by Bouché in Berlin, Germany. H. haemorrhoidalis also has many synonyms depending on where they were described from such as: H. adonidum Haliday, H. semiaureus Girault, H. abdominalis Reuter, H. angustior Priesner, H. ceylonicus Schultz, Dinurothrips rufiventris Girault. In New Zealand, H. haemorrhoidalis is one of the four species belonging to the subfamily Panchaetothripinae.

== Description ==
=== Physical appearance ===
Like other species in the family, Thripidae, they have the typical flattened bodies with wings that are narrow and pointed, and their ovipositors resembles a saw.

==== The Head ====
H. haemorrhoidalis have pale yellow 8-segmented antennae where the last segment narrows to look needle-like. H. haemorrhoidalis have what is described as a hypognathous head that is pointed backwards. The head of the greenhouse thrips is connected to the prothorax by an articular membrance and by cervical sclerites as well. The eyes of the greenhouse thrips are in the form of compound eyes and are made up of 65–70 facets and H. haemorrhoidalis have three ocelli. Another unique thing to the H. haemorrhoidalis is that they have asymmetrical mouthcones that contain an anteclypeus, labrum, labium, paired maxillary stylets and an unpaired left mandible that is well developed.

==== The Body ====
Adults have black thoraxes and yellow to dark brown abdomens, but at the ends of their abdomens, they have an orange coloured tip. Greenhouse thrips have a 10-segmented abdomen. The bodies of the H. haemorrhoidalis are covered with cuticles that have an average thickness of 7.5 micrometers. Their epidermis is made up of flattened cells and have a thickness of 3 micrometers. The forewings of the H. haemorrhoidalis are very narrow and contain few short setae on the veins. The legs of the greenhouse thrips have only a single-segmented tarsi. The body length of an adult H. haemorrhoidalis varies between 1.2 and 1.8 mm long as adults. The three pairs of legs on an adult is white in colour.

H. haemorrhoidalis also have two salivary glands. One pair of the salivary gland is made up of long tubular glands that run parallel to and attached to the midgut by the midgut's basal lamina. This pair is composed of microvillate cells in the distal region and is cuticle-lined in the proximal region. The second pair of salivary glands is confined to the thorax and is made up of ovoid glands. This gland is said to produce a viscous type of secretion while the tubular gland is said to produce a watery type of secretion. The midgut of the H. haemorrhoidalis lacks muscles and the thing that is unique to them is that they have relatively low concentration of ganglia.

=== Reproductive System ===
H. haemorrhoidalis are parthenogenetic therefore, male greenhouse thrips are rare. Female H. haemorrhoidalis have reproductive systems that consists of two ovaries, two lateral oviducts and an accessory gland. The reproductive accessory gland of the H. haemorrhoidalis consists of an apical bulb and a fine gland duct. At the base of the ovipositor is a sebific gland.

== Lifecycle ==
Just like other species of thrips, their lifecycle consists of egg development, two nymphal stages, a non-feeding propupal stage and pupal stage. A single thrips could produce up to seven generations when living in favourable temperate conditions and more than twelve generations when living in favourable tropical conditions. The average lifespan of a H. haemorrhoidalis is about a month.

=== Eggs ===
The female H. haemorrhoidalis lay eggs independently underneath the surface of leaves or on fruits. If there are areas that are exposed, the females would carry their eggs with secretions from the accessory gland and by faeces. The eggs will hatch to release larvae after 14–15 days if they are in environments that are 26–28 °C and will hatch 16–22 days at 21–25 °C.

=== Larvae ===
Larvae of the H. haemorrhoidalis are white in colour with red eyes. Some of the larvae tend to carry fecal droplets on the tips of their abdomen to act as a repellant against predators. They resemble a tinier version of an adult and lack wings. As the greenhouse thrips undergoes their instar stages, they start to darken in colour. After emergence, a female takes about 4–6 days to begin oviposition. They produce up to 47 eggs when the conditions are favourable.

==== Instar stages ====
The structure of the first instar larvae are similar to adults. Their body lengths are between 430 and 480 micrometers and their cuticles have about 1.1–2.5 micrometer of thickness. The internal structure of the first instar larva is not that much different from an adult H. haemorrhoidalis. They only have two spiracles and their ganglia is more densely concentrated than in adults.

The second instar larva is about 1.1 mm in size and are yellowish-brown in colour with pale grey antennae.

The first and second instar stage lasts from 9 to 16 days depending on the temperature of the area they inhabit.

=== Prepupal and Pupal ===
In this stage, the insect is non-feeding. Prepupal and pupal stage will last for 3–6 days depending on the temperature of the area they inhabit. The prepupal have a different appearance in comparison to an adult as they start to develop their wings. The pupa differs physically from the prepupal by the growth of the wings and the folding of the antennae over the insect's head. Prepupal and pupal stage will last for 3–6 days depending on the temperature of the area they inhabit.

== Distribution ==
H. haemorrhoidalis is widely distributed in tropic and subtropic regions. It was speculated that this species was originally from a tropical area and have been introduced to other areas of the world. There is a table listing locations where H. haemorrhoidalis was found at CABI Invasive Species Compendium.

== Relationship with humans ==
=== Pest Status ===
H. haemorrhoidalis had gotten their common name of the greenhouse thrips due to the fact that they typically inhabit and are pests in greenhouses. They are polyphagous as they feed on a wide range of different fruits and ornamental plants. Ornamental plants that they infest are the azaleas, calla lilies, chrysanthemums, fuchsia, roses and orchids. They also are considered pests to ferns, palms and vines and vegetative plants as well. Some of the fruits that they were claim to have damaged were those including avocados, persimmons, and kiwis.

Larvae and adult H. haemorrhoidalis feed by piercing the epidermal tissue of leaves and fruits and sucking out the cellular content. By feeding on the fruits they do not actually affect the quality of the fruit but rather it affects the cosmetics of the fruit which in turn affects the value of the fruit itself. The nymphs are able to produce a reddish fluid that are deposited on the surface of plants which allows for fungal growth to develop. H. haemorrhoidalis prefers feeding on mature foliage and the nitrogen levels of the foliage actually also plays a role in the thrips' preference. The leaves that have undergone attacks by the greenhouse thrips ended up with a lead-like to silvery colouring.

=== Pest Control ===
In the United States, specifically in southern California, H. haemorrhoidalis are considered major pests to avocado farms. But since the usage of the parasitoid, Thripobius semiluteus Boucek, as a form of biological control, the threat of H. haemorrhoidalis on avocados have reduced. Another way that avocado farms try to maintain the threat is to have modified fruit harvesting strategies to eliminate breeding and feeding sites of the thrips. Another usage of parasitoids was used in 2001 in New Zealand to control the greenhouse thrips. The parasitoid Thripobius javae is typically a predator of the H. haemorrhoidalis.

H. haemorrhoidalis are also susceptible to phosphine and have been controlled with 2 hours of fumigation with 620 ppm phosphine. Other methods of microbial control have been used against the greenhouse thrips as well. Entomopathogens are a form of microbial insecticides that are used for thrips control. But despite being somewhat susceptible to fumigation and insecticides, it is said that H. haemorrhoidalis have great tendency to develop resistance to insecticides overall.

== Predators ==
Naturally, H. haemorrhoidalis have two parasitoids, Megaphragma spp. and the Thripobius javae. Megaphragma attacks the eggs of H. haemorrhoidalis while T. javae attacks the larvae of H. haemorrhoidalis. It is said that when there is presence of the Thripobius javae in greenhouse plants, it is an indicator that there are H. haemorrhoidalis in the greenhouse. Although, one of the Megaphragma sp., Megaphragma mymaripenne, is not effective in treating greenhouse thrips despite a study showing that 50% of the H. haemorrhoidalis eggs showed parasite emergence holes when exposing the greenhouse thrips to that particular Megaphragma species.

Other predators that prey on the H. haemorrhoidalis are the wasp species of Spilomena emarginata and S. nozela. These wasps attack adult and larval greenhouse thrips and paralyze them to feed to their own larvae.
