= Thripobius semiluteus =

Scientific classification
- Kingdom: Animalia
- Phylum: Arthropoda
- Class: Insecta
- Order: Hymenoptera
- Family: Eulophidae
- Genus: Thripobius
- Species: T. semiluteus

Binomial name
- Thripobius semiluteus Boucek, 1977

Species of wasp

Thripobius semiluteus is a species of parasitic wasp. It has been introduced as a biological control of Heliothrips haemorrhoidalis, greenhouse thrips, in Southern California avocado orchards.
