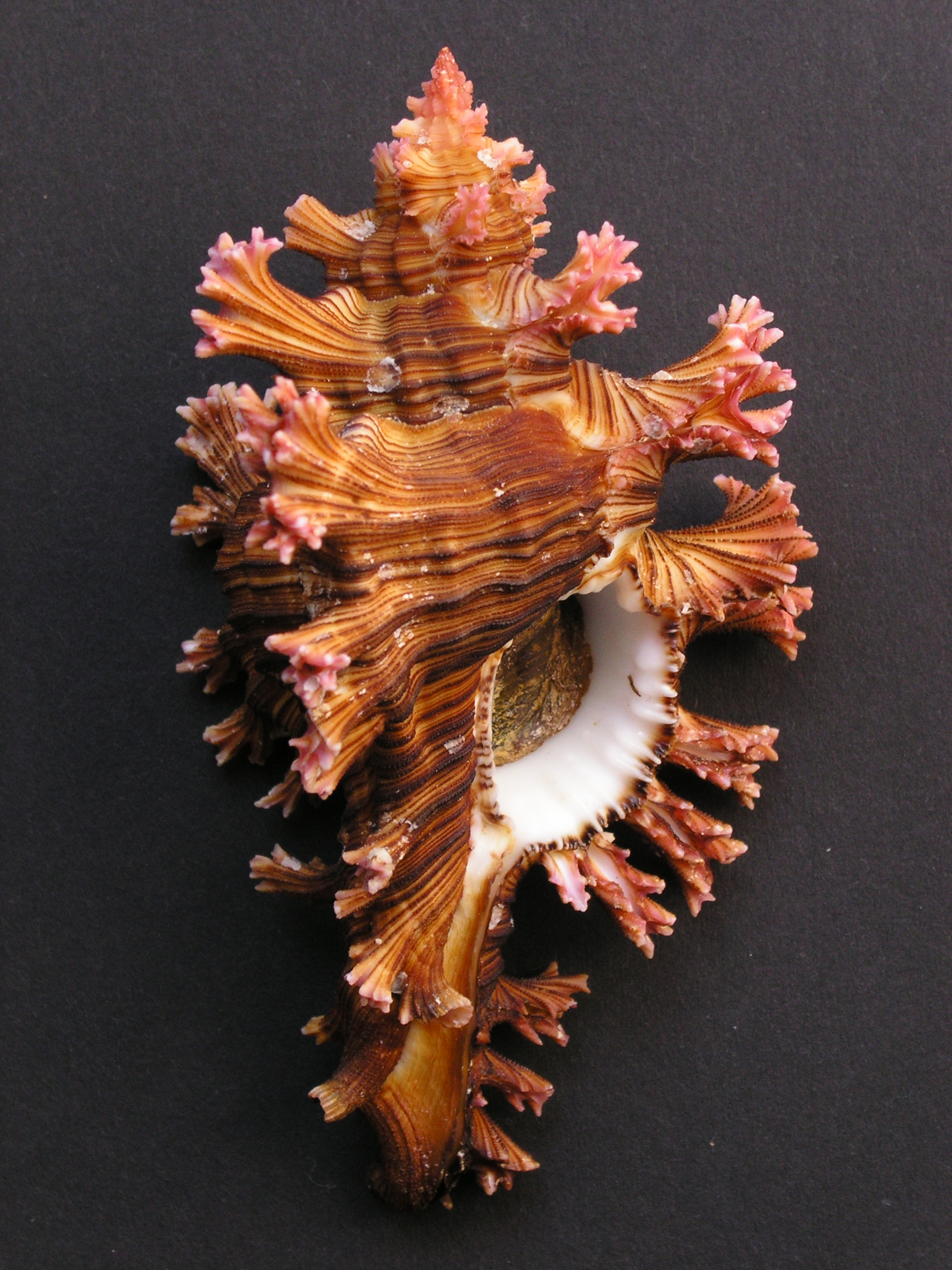
- A shell of Chicoreus palmarosae

Scientific classification
- Kingdom: Animalia
- Phylum: Mollusca
- Class: Gastropoda
- Subclass: Caenogastropoda
- Order: Neogastropoda
- Family: Muricidae
- Genus: Chicoreus
- Species: C. palmarosae

Binomial name
- Chicoreus palmarosae (Lamarck, 1822)

Synonyms
- Chicoreus (Triplex) maurus sauliae Sowerby, G.B. II, 1841; Chicoreus (Triplex) palmarosae (Lamarck, 1822); Chicoreus (Triplex) palmarosae rosarius (f) Perry, G., 1811; Chicoreus (Triplex) rosaria Perry, G., 1811; Murex argyna Mörch, 1852; Murex palmarosae Lamarck, 1822

= Chicoreus palmarosae =

Species of gastropod

Chicoreus palmarosae (rose-branch murex) is a species of predatory sea snail, a marine gastropod mollusk in the family Muricidae, the murex snails.

== Description ==
The size of an adult shell varies between 65 mm and 130 mm. It is mostly dark red with branch like structures all over the conch.

== Distribution ==
This species occurs in the Indian Ocean along the Chagos Atoll and the Mascarene Basin; in the Pacific Ocean along Sri Lanka and Southwest Japan.
