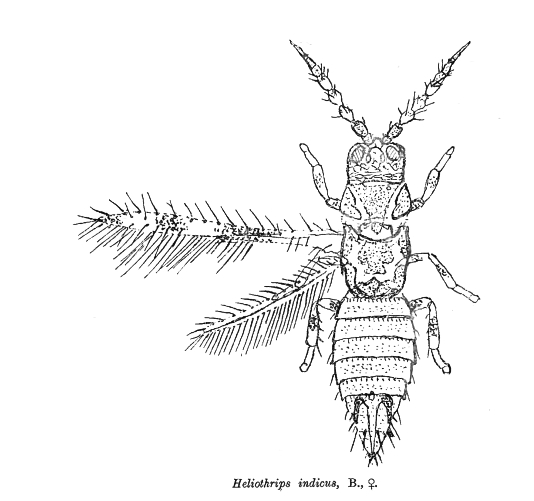
- Heliothrips indicus

Scientific classification
- Kingdom: Animalia
- Phylum: Arthropoda
- Class: Insecta
- Order: Thysanoptera
- Family: Thripidae
- Subfamily: Panchaetothripinae
- Genus: Heliothrips; Haliday, 1836

= Heliothrips =

Genus of thrips

Heliothrips is a genus of thrips in the family Thripidae. There are about 18 described species in Heliothrips.

== Species ==
These 18 species belong to the genus Heliothrips:

- Heliothrips braziliensis Morgan
- Heliothrips bromi Moulton, 1927
- Heliothrips bruneri Morgan
- Heliothrips brunneipennis Bagnall
- Heliothrips cinctipennis (Hood)
- Heliothrips crestri Pergande
- Heliothrips globiceps Karny, 1913
- Heliothrips gossypii Moulton, 1927
- Heliothrips haemorrhoidalis (Bouché, 1833) (greenhouse thrips)
- Heliothrips impurus Priesner, 1927
- Heliothrips indicus Bagnall
- Heliothrips margipennis
- Heliothrips pattersoni (Bagnall)
- Heliothrips phaseoli (Hood)
- Heliothrips similis
- Heliothrips striatopterus (Kobur)
- Heliothrips zucchi Mound & Monteiro
- † Heliothrips scudderi Bagnall, 1924
