= Prestwichia =

Scientific classification
- Kingdom: Animalia
- Phylum: Arthropoda
- Class: Insecta
- Order: Hymenoptera
- Family: Trichogrammatidae
- Subfamily: Oligositinae
- Genus: Prestwichia; Lubbock, 1864

Species
- Prestwichia aquatica; Prestwichia indica; Prestwichia multiciliata; Prestwichia solitaria; Prestwichia zygopterorum

Genus of wasps

Prestwichia is a wasp genus in the family Trichogrammatidae. It contains seven species.
