= Tumidiclava =

Scientific classification
- Kingdom: Animalia
- Phylum: Arthropoda
- Class: Insecta
- Order: Hymenoptera
- Family: Trichogrammatidae
- Genus: Tumidiclava; Girault, 1911

Species
- Tumidiclava agraensis; Tumidiclava bimaculata; Tumidiclava canalis; Tumidiclava ciliata; Tumidiclava gilva; Tumidiclava longiclavata; Tumidiclava magnicorpa; Tumidiclava minoripenis; Tumidiclava minuscula; Tumidiclava niveipes; Tumidiclava nowickii; Tumidiclava pampeana; Tumidiclava pulchrinotum; Tumidiclava sasniensis; Tumidiclava simplicis; Tumidiclava subcaudata; Tumidiclava tenkasiensis; Tumidiclava tenuipennis

Genus of wasps

Tumidiclava is a wasp genus in the family Trichogrammatidae.
