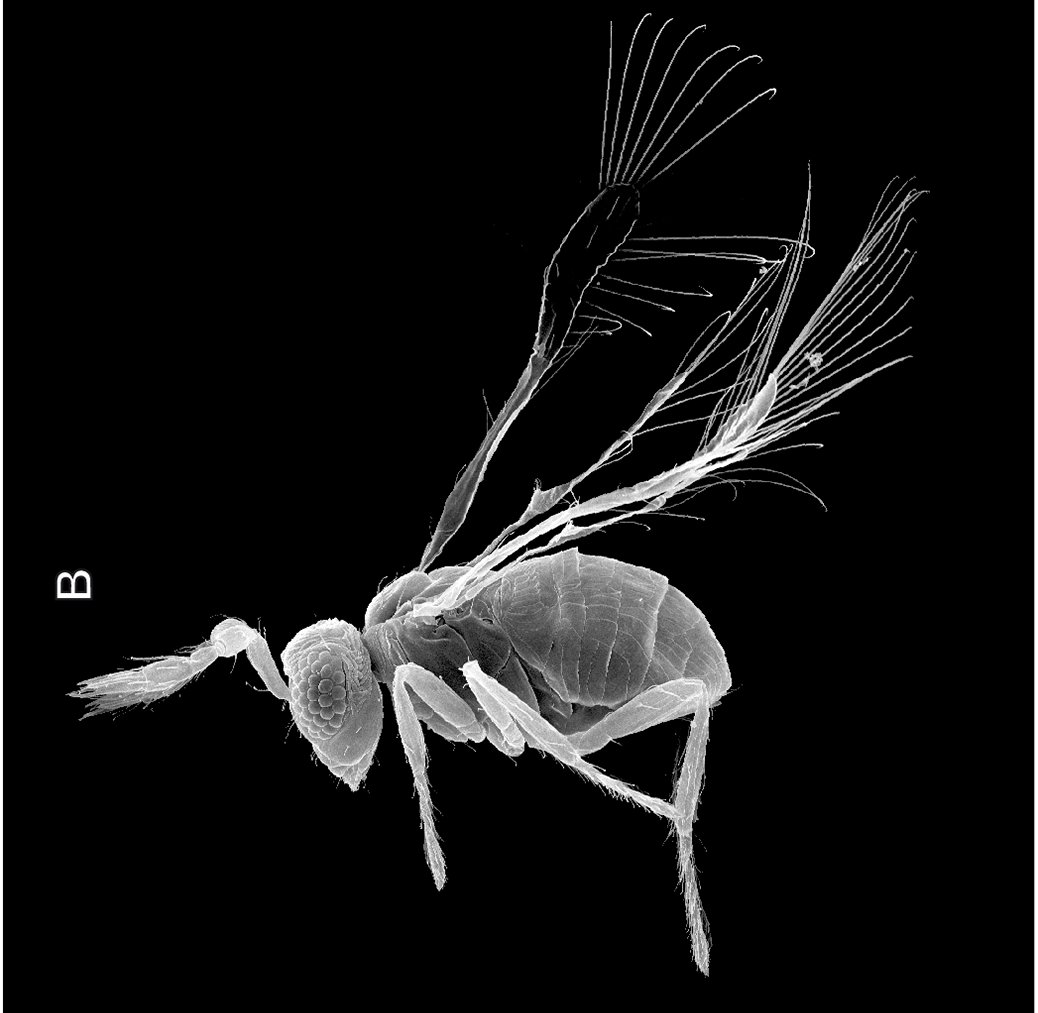
- Megaphragma mymaripenne

Scientific classification
- Kingdom: Animalia
- Phylum: Arthropoda
- Clade: Pancrustacea
- Class: Insecta
- Order: Hymenoptera
- Superfamily: Chalcidoidea
- Family: Trichogrammatidae; Haliday, 1851

Genera
- See text

Diversity
- >80 genera

Synonyms
- Oligositini (Ashmead, 1904); Poropoeini (Girault, 1912); Trichogrammatoidae (Foerster, 1856)

= Trichogrammatidae =

Trichogrammatidae Temporal range: Priabonian–Present

Family of wasps

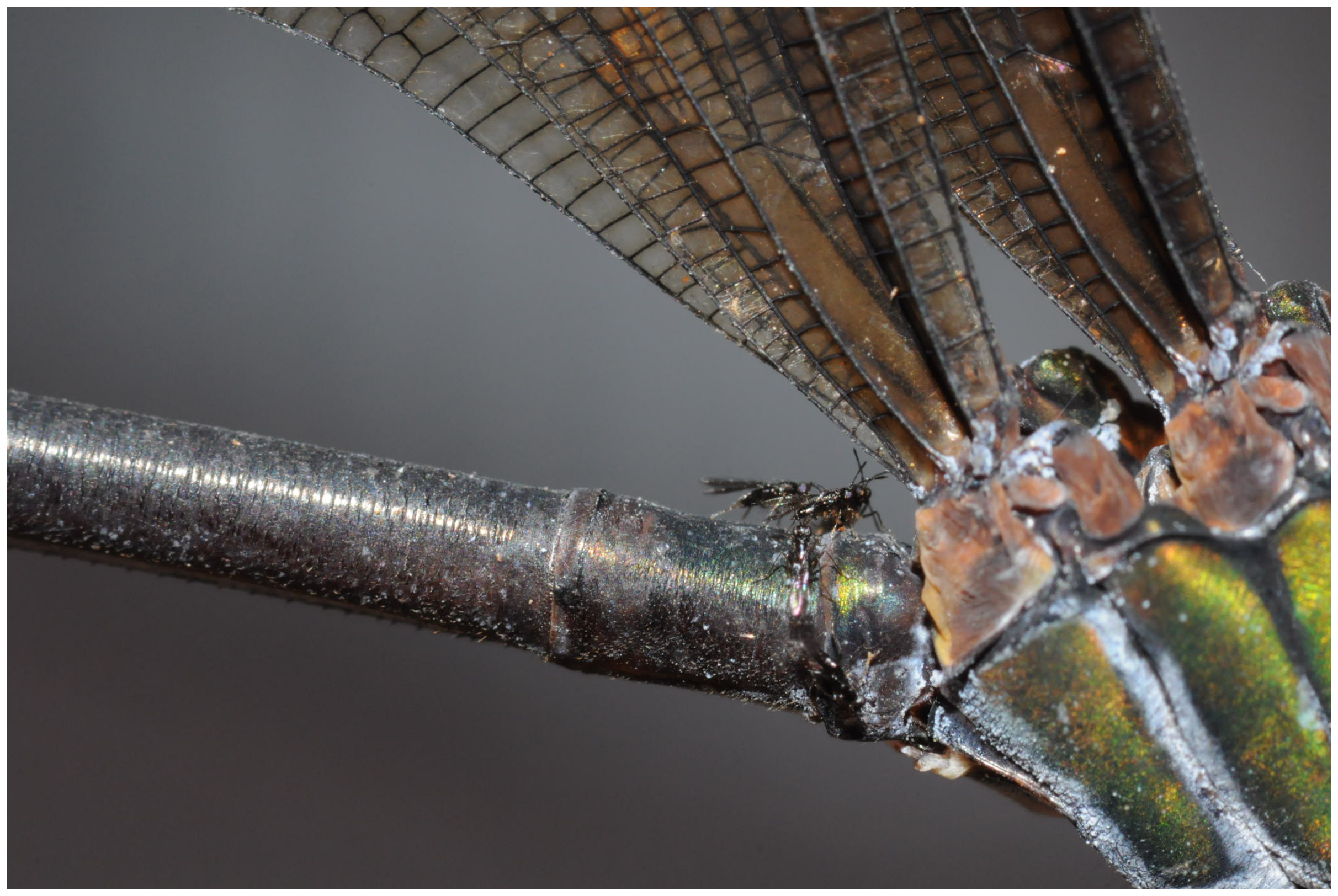
A female Hydrophylita emporos on a female Psolodesmus mandarinus mandarinus.

The Trichogrammatidae are a family of small endoparasitoid wasps in the superfamily Chalcidoidea that include some of the smallest of all insects, with most species having adults less than 1 mm in length, with species of Megaphragma having an adult body length less than 300 μm. Over 840 species are placed in about 80 genera; their distribution is worldwide.

Their fossil record extends back to the Eocene aged Baltic amber.

== Description ==
The Trichogrammatidae have 3-segmented tarsi, without strigil on the foretarsus. The abdomen is broadly jointed to the metathorax and is penetrated by a muscle-bearing mesophragma. Its forewings are fringed by marginal cilia and are larger than its hindwings.

They are not strong fliers and are generally moved through the air by the prevailing winds. Their fore wings are typically somewhat stubby and paddle-shaped, with a long fringe of hinged setae around the outer margin to increase the surface area during the downstroke. Males of some species are wingless, and mate with their sisters inside the host egg in which they are born, dying without ever leaving the host egg.

=== Antennae ===
Trichogrammatidae have short antennae, with the sockets low on its face and are elbowed at the junction of the scape and pedicel. The scape is held in a facial scrobe. The flagellum consists of 1 or 2 annuli and the flagellar segments vary between genera but do not exceed 7 in female antennae. The funicle never exceeds 2 segments and may be absent. The clava consists of 1 to 5 segments. The male antennae are usually similar to those of females but in some genera (e.g., Ufens, Trichogramma) there is a noticeable difference in the antennae.

=== Nervous system ===
Trichogrammatidae have unique nervous systems resulting from the necessity to conserve space. They have one of the smallest nervous systems, with one particularly diminutive species, Megaphragma mymaripenne, containing as few as 7,400 neurons. They are also the first (and only) known animals which have functioning neurons without nuclei.

The neurons develop during pupation with functional nuclei and manufacture enough proteins to last through the short lifespans of the adults. Before emerging as an adult, the nuclei are destroyed, allowing the wasp to conserve space by making the neurons smaller. Even without nuclei (which contain the DNA, essential for manufacturing proteins to repair damage in living cells), the neurons can survive because the proteins manufactured as a pupa are sufficient.

== Diet ==
Trichogrammatids parasitize the eggs of many different orders of insects, notably the Lepidoptera, Coleoptera, Hemiptera, Hymenoptera and Diptera. As such, many species are among the more important biological control agents known, attacking many pest insects.

== Genera ==
- Adelogramma
- Adryas
- Aphelinoidea
- Apseudogramma
- Asynacta
- Australufens
- Bloodiella
- Brachista
- Brachistagrapha
- Brachygrammatella
- Brachyia
- Brachyufens
- Burksiella
- Centrobiopsis
- Ceratogramma
- Chaetogramma
- Chaetostricha
- Chaetostrichella
- Densufens
- Doirania
- Emeria
- Enneagmus
- Epoligosita
- Epoligosita
- Eteroligosita
- Eutrichogramma
- Haeckeliania
- Hayatia
- Hispidophila
- Hydrophylita
- Ittys
- Ittysella
- Japania
- Kyuwia
- Lathromeris
- Lathromeroidea
- Lathromeromyia
- Megaphragma
- Microcaetiscus
- Mirufens
- Monorthochaeta
- Neobrachista
- Neobrachistella
- Neocentrobia
- Neocentrobiella
- Neolathromera
- Nicolavespa
- Oligosita
- Oligositoides
- Ophioneurus
- Pachamama
- Paracentrobia
- Paraittys
- Paratrichogramma
- Paruscanoidea
- Pintoa
- Poropoea
- Prestwichia
- Probrachista
- Prochaetostricha
- Prosoligosita
- Prouscana
- Pseudobrachysticha
- Pseudogrammina
- Pseudoligosita
- Pseudomirufens
- Pseuduscana
- Pterandrophysalis
- Pteranomalogramma
- Pterygogramma
- Sinepalpigramma
- Soikiella
- Szelenyia
- Thanatogramma
- Thoreauia
- Trichogramma
- Trichogrammatella
- Trichogrammatoidea
- Trichogrammatomyia
- Tumidiclava
- Tumidifemur
- Ufens
- Ufensia
- Urogramma
- Uscana
- Uscanella
- Uscanoidea
- Uscanopsis
- Viggianiella
- Xenufens
- Xenufensia
- Xiphogramma
- Zaga
- Zagella
- Zelogramma
