= List of Gonatocerus species =

This is a list of 262 species in Gonatocerus, a genus of fairyflies in the family Mymaridae.

== Gonatocerus species ==
- Gonatocerus abbreviatus Ogloblin, 1953^{g}
- Gonatocerus acanophorae Ogloblin, 1938^{g}
- Gonatocerus acuminatus (Walker, 1846)^{c g}
- Gonatocerus aegyptiacus Soyka, 1950^{c g}
- Gonatocerus aequatorianus Ogloblin, 1959^{g}
- Gonatocerus aethalionis Ogloblin, 1938^{g}
- Gonatocerus africanus Risbec, 1956^{c g}
- Gonatocerus americanus Brues, 1907^{c g}
- Gonatocerus angustiventris Girault, 1915^{c g}
- Gonatocerus annulicornis (Ogloblin, 1936)^{c g}
- Gonatocerus anomocerus Crawford, 1913^{c g}
- Gonatocerus anthonomi Girault, 1905^{c g}
- Gonatocerus antillensis Dozier, 1937^{c g}
- Gonatocerus appendiculatus Ogloblin, 1939^{g}
- Gonatocerus arkadak ^{g}
- Gonatocerus ashmeadi Girault, 1915^{c g}
- Gonatocerus asulcifrons Zeya, 1995^{c g}
- Gonatocerus ater Forster, 1841^{g}
- Gonatocerus atriclavus Girault, 1917^{c g}
- Gonatocerus aureus Girault, 1911^{c g}
- Gonatocerus australica Girault, 1913^{c g}
- Gonatocerus ayrensis Girault, 1913^{c g}
- Gonatocerus baconi Girault, 1912^{c g}
- Gonatocerus bakrotus Mani & Saraswat, 1973^{c g}
- Gonatocerus barbos ^{g}
- Gonatocerus bashai Zeya, 1995^{c g}
- Gonatocerus berezovskiyi Triapitsyn^{g}
- Gonatocerus berijamus Mani & Saraswat, 1973^{c g}
- Gonatocerus beshbarmak Triapitsyn^{g}
- Gonatocerus bialbifuniculatus Subba Rao, 1989^{c g}
- Gonatocerus bicolor Girault, 1913^{c g}
- Gonatocerus bicoloriventris Zeya, 1995^{c g}
- Gonatocerus bifasciativentris Girault, 1917^{c g}
- Gonatocerus blefuscu ^{g}
- Gonatocerus blesticus Ogloblin, 1957^{g}
- Gonatocerus bonaerensis Ogloblin, 1939^{g}
- Gonatocerus bonariensis Brethes, 1922^{g}
- Gonatocerus boswelli Girault, 1915^{c g}
- Gonatocerus bouceki Zeya, 1995^{c g}
- Gonatocerus brachyurus Ogloblin, 1938^{g}
- Gonatocerus brevifuniculatus Subba Rao, 1970^{c g}
- Gonatocerus breviterebratus Subba Rao, 1989^{c g}
- Gonatocerus brunneus Girault, 1911^{c g}
- Gonatocerus brunoi Girault, 1912^{c g}
- Gonatocerus bucculentus Huber, 1988^{c g}
- Gonatocerus bukashka Triapitsyn^{g}
- Gonatocerus bulgaricus Donev & Triapitsyn^{g}
- Gonatocerus californicus Girault, 1911^{c g}
- Gonatocerus capitatus Gahan, 1932^{c g}
- Gonatocerus carahuensis Ogloblin, 1957^{g}
- Gonatocerus carlylei Girault, 1913^{c g}
- Gonatocerus caudatus Ogloblin, 1935^{c g}
- Gonatocerus chrysis (Debauche, 1948)^{c g}
- Gonatocerus chusqueicolus Ogloblin, 1957^{g}
- Gonatocerus cincticipitis Sahad, 1982^{c g}
- Gonatocerus cingulatus Perkins, 1905^{c g}
- Gonatocerus circumvagus Girault, 1915^{c g}
- Gonatocerus comptei Girault, 1912^{c g}
- Gonatocerus concinnus Ogloblin, 1936^{g}
- Gonatocerus conicus (Mathot, 1969)^{g}
- Gonatocerus coxalis Ogloblin, 1959^{g}
- Gonatocerus crassicornis Viggiani, 1969^{g}
- Gonatocerus cubensis Dozier, 1932^{c g}
- Gonatocerus cuscus ^{g}
- Gonatocerus dakhlae Soyka, 1950^{c g}
- Gonatocerus darwini Girault, 1912^{c g}
- Gonatocerus davinci Girault, 1912^{c g}
- Gonatocerus deficiens Ogloblin, 1946^{g}
- Gonatocerus deleoni Triapitsyn, Logarzo & Virla, 2008^{g}
- Gonatocerus delhiensis (Narayanan & Subba Rao, 1961)^{c g}
- Gonatocerus devikulamus Mani & Saraswat, 1973^{c g}
- Gonatocerus devitatakus Mani & Saraswat, 1973^{c g}
- Gonatocerus dies Girault, 1913^{c g}
- Gonatocerus dodo Girault, 1920^{c g}
- Gonatocerus dolichocerus Ashmead, 1887^{c g}
- Gonatocerus edentulus Zeya, 1995^{c g}
- Gonatocerus elizabethae Girault, 1925^{c g}
- Gonatocerus ella Girault, 1931^{c g}
- Gonatocerus enicmophilus Huber, 1988^{c g}
- Gonatocerus excisus Ogloblin, 1936^{g}
- Gonatocerus exiguus Forster, 1861^{g}
- Gonatocerus fasciativentris Girault, 1913^{c g}
- Gonatocerus fasciatus Girault, 1911^{c g}
- Gonatocerus flagellaris Ogloblin, 1959^{g}
- Gonatocerus flagellatus Huber, 1988^{c g}
- Gonatocerus flaviventris Dozier, 1932^{c g}
- Gonatocerus flavocinctus (Walker, 1846)^{c g}
- Gonatocerus flavus Soyka, 1950^{c g}
- Gonatocerus floridensis Huber, 1988^{c g}
- Gonatocerus flosculus Girault, 1915^{c g}
- Gonatocerus fulgor Girault, 1913^{c g}
- Gonatocerus fulvipodus Subba Rao, 1989^{c g}
- Gonatocerus fuscicornis (Walker, 1846)^{c g}
- Gonatocerus garchamp ^{g}
- Gonatocerus gerasim ^{g}
- Gonatocerus goethei Girault, 1912^{c g}
- Gonatocerus gracilicornis Ogloblin, 1936^{g}
- Gonatocerus grandis Ogloblin, 1936^{g}
- Gonatocerus granulosus Ogloblin, 1959^{g}
- Gonatocerus gregi Girault, 1915^{c g}
- Gonatocerus hackeri Girault, 1938^{c g}
- Gonatocerus haeckeli Girault, 1912^{c g}
- Gonatocerus hallami Girault, 1920^{c g}
- Gonatocerus heinei Girault, 1938^{c g}
- Gonatocerus helavai Yoshimoto, 1990^{c g}
- Gonatocerus helmholtzii Girault, 1912^{c g}
- Gonatocerus hispaniolus ^{g}
- Gonatocerus h-luteum (Ogloblin, 1938)^{c g}
- Gonatocerus huberi Zeya, 1995^{c g}
- Gonatocerus huxleyi Girault, 1912^{c g}
- Gonatocerus huyghensi Girault, 1912^{c g}
- Gonatocerus illinoiensis Girault, 1917^{c g}
- Gonatocerus impar Huber, 1988^{c g}
- Gonatocerus inaequalis Debauche, 1949^{c g}
- Gonatocerus inauditus Ogloblin, 1936^{g}
- Gonatocerus incomptus Huber, 1988^{c g}
- Gonatocerus indigenus Girault, 1938^{c g}
- Gonatocerus inexpectatus Huber, 1988^{c g}
- Gonatocerus inflatiscapus Huber, 1988^{c g}
- Gonatocerus io Girault, 1915^{c g}
- Gonatocerus ipswichia Girault, 1922^{c g}
- Gonatocerus janzeni Huber^{g}
- Gonatocerus johnstonia Girault, 1917^{c g}
- Gonatocerus juvator Perkins, 1912^{c g}
- Gonatocerus kalika Triapitsyn^{g}
- Gonatocerus karakum Triapitsyn^{g}
- Gonatocerus karlik Triapitsyn^{g}
- Gonatocerus katraps Triapitsyn^{g}
- Gonatocerus kazak Triapitsyn^{g}
- Gonatocerus kikimora Triapitsyn^{g}
- Gonatocerus kiskis ^{g}
- Gonatocerus kochi Girault, 1936^{c g}
- Gonatocerus kodaianus (Mani & Saraswat, 1973)^{c g}
- Gonatocerus koebelei Perkins, 1912^{c g}
- Gonatocerus komarik Triapitsyn^{g}
- Gonatocerus koziavka Triapitsyn^{g}
- Gonatocerus krasavchik Triapitsyn^{g}
- Gonatocerus kulik Triapitsyn^{g}
- Gonatocerus kum Triapitsyn^{g}
- Gonatocerus kusaka Triapitsyn^{g}
- Gonatocerus lamarcki Girault, 1912^{c g}
- Gonatocerus latipennis Girault, 1911^{c g}
- Gonatocerus lissonotus Huber, 1988^{c g}
- Gonatocerus litoralis (Haliday, 1833)^{c g}
- Gonatocerus logarzoi ^{g}
- Gonatocerus lomonosoffi Girault, 1913^{c g}
- Gonatocerus longicornis Nees, 1834^{c g}
- Gonatocerus longicrus Kieffer, 1913^{c g}
- Gonatocerus longior Soyka, 1946^{c g}
- Gonatocerus longiterebratus Subba Rao, 1989^{c g}
- Gonatocerus lucidus Dodd, 1919^{c g}
- Gonatocerus macauleyi Girault, 1920^{c g}
- Gonatocerus maculatus Zeya, 1995^{c g}
- Gonatocerus maculipennis Ashmead, 1900^{g}
- Gonatocerus maga Girault, 1911^{c g}
- Gonatocerus malanadensis Subba Rao, 1989^{c g}
- Gonatocerus mancae Fidalgo & Virla, 1995^{g}
- Gonatocerus margiscutum Girault, 1914^{c g}
- Gonatocerus masneri Yoshimoto, 1990^{c g}
- Gonatocerus mazzinini Girault, 1913^{c g}
- Gonatocerus mediterraneus Donev & Triapitsyn^{g}
- Gonatocerus megalura (Mathot, 1969)^{g}
- Gonatocerus merces Girault, 1913^{c g}
- Gonatocerus metanotalis Ogloblin, 1938^{g}
- Gonatocerus metchnikoffi Girault, 1912^{c g}
- Gonatocerus mexicanus Perkins, 1912^{c g}
- Gonatocerus minimus Forster, 1841^{g}
- Gonatocerus minor Matthews, 1986^{c g}
- Gonatocerus mirissimus Girault, 1913^{c g}
- Gonatocerus mirivorus Kurdjumov, 1912^{g}
- Gonatocerus mitjaevi Triapitsyn & Rakitov^{g}
- Gonatocerus monticolus Zeya, 1995^{c g}
- Gonatocerus morgani Triapitsyn, 2006^{c g}
- Gonatocerus morrilli (Howard, 1908)^{c g}
- Gonatocerus mosesi Girault, 1938^{c g}
- Gonatocerus mumu ^{g}
- Gonatocerus munnarus Mani & Saraswat, 1973^{c g}
- Gonatocerus musa Girault, 1938^{c g}
- Gonatocerus narayani (Subba Rao & Kaur, 1959)^{c g}
- Gonatocerus nassaui Girault, 1938^{c g}
- Gonatocerus nasutus Ogloblin, 1939^{g}
- Gonatocerus nigriceps Ogloblin, 1955^{g}
- Gonatocerus nigricornis Girault, 1917^{c g}
- Gonatocerus nigricorpus Girault, 1917^{c g}
- Gonatocerus nigriflagellum Girault, 1914^{g}
- Gonatocerus nigritarsis Ashmead, 1887^{c g}
- Gonatocerus nigrithorax (Ogloblin, 1953)^{c g}
- Gonatocerus nonsulcatus Girault, 1915^{c g}
- Gonatocerus notabilis Girault, 1938^{c g}
- Gonatocerus novickyi Soyka, 1946^{c g}
- Gonatocerus novifasciatus Girault, 1911^{c g}
- Gonatocerus nox Girault, 1913^{c g}
- Gonatocerus nuntius Girault, 1920^{c g}
- Gonatocerus orientalis Girault, 1917^{c g}
- Gonatocerus ornatus Gahan, 1918^{c g}
- Gonatocerus ovicenatus Leonard & Crosby, 1915^{c g}
- Gonatocerus oxypygus Foerster, 1856^{g}
- Gonatocerus pachyscapha Girault, 1915^{c g}
- Gonatocerus pahlgamensis (Narayanan, 1961)^{c g}
- Gonatocerus parcepilosus Ogloblin, 1957^{g}
- Gonatocerus partifuscipennis Girault, 1916^{c g}
- Gonatocerus pater Girault, 1920^{c g}
- Gonatocerus perdix Girault, 1938^{c g}
- Gonatocerus perforator Ogloblin, 1953^{g}
- Gonatocerus petrarchi Girault, 1920^{c g}
- Gonatocerus pictus (Haliday, 1833)^{c g}
- Gonatocerus piriformis Ogloblin, 1955^{g}
- Gonatocerus poincarei Girault, 1913^{c g}
- Gonatocerus portoricensis Dozier, 1937^{c g}
- Gonatocerus pratensis Ogloblin, 1936^{g}
- Gonatocerus priesneri Soyka, 1950^{c g}
- Gonatocerus pusilus Ogloblin, 1935^{g}
- Gonatocerus pygmaeus Girault, 1911^{c g}
- Gonatocerus quadrivittatus Dozier, 1932^{c g}
- Gonatocerus quirogai Ogloblin, 1936^{g}
- Gonatocerus rakitovi ^{g}
- Gonatocerus ramakrishnai (Subba Rao & Kaur, 1959)^{c g}
- Gonatocerus rivalis Girault, 1911^{c g b}
- Gonatocerus rogersi Matthews, 1986^{c g}
- Gonatocerus romae Girault, 1928^{c g}
- Gonatocerus rufescens Ashmead, 1904^{g}
- Gonatocerus sahadevani (Subba Rao & Kaur, 1959)^{c g}
- Gonatocerus sarawakensis Sveum, 1982^{c g}
- Gonatocerus saulfrommeri Triapitsyn^{g}
- Gonatocerus schajovskoii Ogloblin, 1957^{g}
- Gonatocerus seminiger Ogloblin, 1959^{g}
- Gonatocerus shakespearei Girault, 1915^{c g}
- Gonatocerus shamimi Subba Rao & Hayat, 1986^{c g}
- Gonatocerus silhouettae Masi, 1917^{c g}
- Gonatocerus spectabilis Zeya, 1995^{c g}
- Gonatocerus spinozai Girault, 1912^{c g}
- Gonatocerus spiracularis Ogloblin, 1935^{g}
- Gonatocerus stenopterus Ogloblin, 1936^{g}
- Gonatocerus sulcatus Girault, 1915^{c g}
- Gonatocerus sulphuripes (Forster, 1847)^{g}
- Gonatocerus svat Triapitsyn^{g}
- Gonatocerus tamilanus Mani & Saraswat, 1973^{c g}
- Gonatocerus tarae (Narayanan & Subba Rao, 1961)^{c g}
- Gonatocerus taringae Girault, 1938^{c g}
- Gonatocerus tenuipennis Girault, 1911^{c g}
- Gonatocerus terrigena Girault, 1938^{c g}
- Gonatocerus thyrides (Debauche, 1948)^{c g}
- Gonatocerus tolstoii Girault, 1913^{c g}
- Gonatocerus trialbifuniculatus Subba Rao, 1989^{c g}
- Gonatocerus triangulifer Ogloblin, 1959^{g}
- Gonatocerus tricolor Girault, 1913^{c g}
- Gonatocerus triguttatus Girault, 1916^{c g}
- Gonatocerus tuberculifemur (Ogloblin, 1957)^{c g}
- Gonatocerus uat Triapitsyn, 2006^{c g}
- Gonatocerus ucri Triapitsyn^{g}
- Gonatocerus udakamundus Mani & Saraswat, 1973^{c g}
- Gonatocerus unicolouratus Subba Rao, 1989^{c g}
- Gonatocerus urocerus Ogloblin, 1935^{c g}
- Gonatocerus utahensis Girault, 1917^{c g}
- Gonatocerus utkalensis Subba Rao, 1989^{c g}
- Gonatocerus valentinae Ogloblin, 1959^{g}
- Gonatocerus venustus Zeya, 1995^{c g}
- Gonatocerus vidanoi (Viggiani & Jesu, 1986)^{g}
- Gonatocerus virlai S.Triapitsyn & Logarzo^{g}
- Gonatocerus walkerjonesi Triapitsyn, 2006^{c g}
- Gonatocerus woohoo Triapitsyn^{g}
- Gonatocerus yerongae Girault, 1938^{c g}

Data sources: c = Catalogue of Life, g = GBIF, b = Bugguide.net
