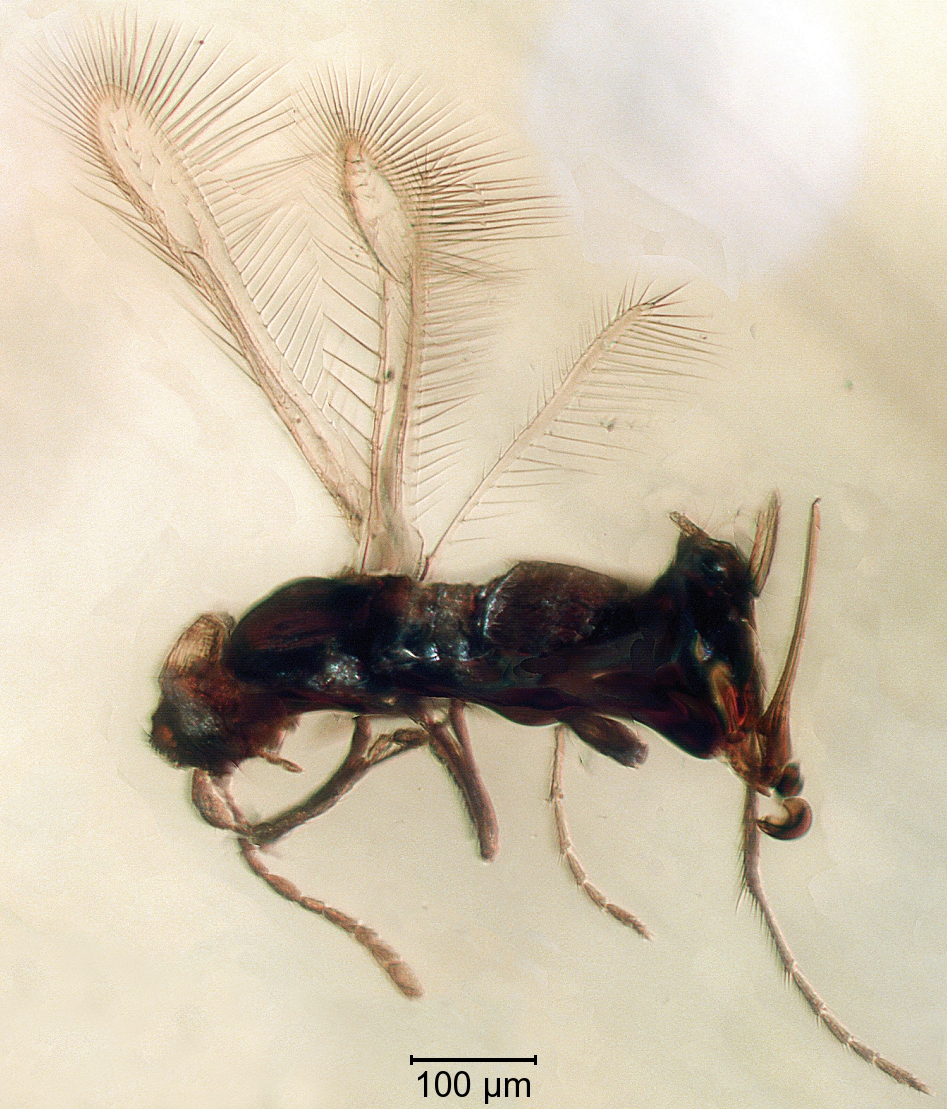
- Female Myanmymar aresconoides in amber

Scientific classification
- Kingdom: Animalia
- Phylum: Arthropoda
- Clade: Pancrustacea
- Class: Insecta
- Order: Hymenoptera
- Family: Mymaridae
- Genus: †Myanmymar; Huber, 2011
- Species: †M. aresconoides

Binomial name
- †Myanmymar aresconoides Huber, 2011

= Myanmymar =

Myanmymar Temporal range: Cenomanian, 99 Ma

Extinct genus of wasps

Myanmymar is an extinct genus of fairyfly preserved in Burmese amber from Myanmar. It has only one species, Myanmymar aresconoides. It is dated to the earliest part of the Cenomanian stage of the Late Cretaceous, around 99 million years old. As of 2011, it is the oldest known fossil mymarid.

== Discovery and geologic time range ==
Myanmymar aresconoides was described by John T. Huber and George Poinar Jr. from a specimen of a female embedded in Burmese amber. The amber was recovered in 2001 from the Noije Bum 2001 Summit Site, a fossil amber mine in Hukawng Valley, Kachin State of Myanmar. The site is dated to the Albian-Cenomanian (97 to 110 million years ago) of the Early Cretaceous epoch. As of 2011, this makes Myanmymar aresconoides the oldest known fossil mymarid recovered.

== Taxonomy ==
Myanmymar aresconoides is the only species belonging to the genus Myanmymar. It belongs to the family of fairyflies Mymaridae of the chalcid wasp superfamily Chalcidoidea.

The generic name Myanmymar is derived from a euphonious combination of "Myanmar" and Greek μῶμος (mōmos, "spot" or "blot"). The specific name means "resembling Arescon", from Arescon (an extant genus of fairyfly) and Greek -εἶδος (eidos, "like", "resembling").

== Description ==
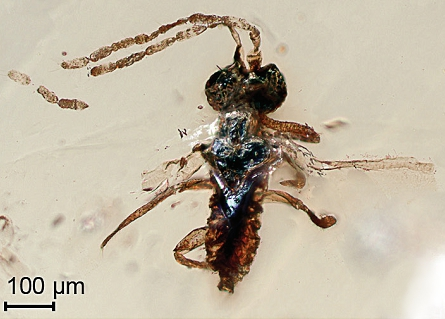
Possible male specimen of the M. aresconoides

Like other fairyflies, M. aresconoides is a tiny wasp. The entire body length of the specimen is about half a millimeter, 535 μm (0.0211 in). The head measures about 120 μm (0.0047 in) and have moderately sized eyes. The antennae have eight segments in the funicle and two on club-like tip (clava). The maxillary palps have three segments.

The mesosoma (middle part of the body) is 200 μm (0.0079 in) long. It has narrow forewings, with wing venation extending up to two-thirds of the length and a rounded lobe at the base. On the margins are numerous long bristle-like projections (marginal setae), the longest of which is about twice the greatest width of the wing. The hindwings are also narrow with parallel sides. Their marginal setae are about seven times the width of the wing. Both wings do not possess microtrichia (small irregularly scattered hairs), except for two sparse rows beyond the venation of the forewings.

The legs have long tarsi with five segments. The tibia is not clearly visible but is assumed to be about the same length as the tarsi.

The metasoma is longer than the mesosoma, at 225 μm (0.0089 in). The ovipositor is 218 μm (0.0086 in) long, with the sheath slightly extending over the tip of the metasoma.

As the specific name suggests, M. aresconoides is very similar to the extant genus Arescon in wing shape and venation. Only three other modern mymarid genera (Boudiennyia, Eustochomorpha, and Borneomymar) share all the M. aresconoides characteristics of having forewing venation longer than half the wing length, five segments on the tarsi, and eight segments on the funicles. M. aresconoides is also unique among fairyflies in having three distinct segments on the palpi. In contrast, all modern mymarids have unsegmented palpi.

Another specimen of a possible male of the species was also discovered. It is 445 μm (0.0175 in) long, with a head 148 μm (0.0058 in) wide. However, it is impossible to ascertain if they belong to the same species due to the poor condition of the second specimen.

== See also ==
- Prehistoric insects
- Paleoentomology
