= Lymaenon =

Scientific classification
- Kingdom: Animalia
- Phylum: Arthropoda
- Class: Insecta
- Order: Hymenoptera
- Family: Mymaridae
- Genus: Lymaenon; Walker, 1846

Genus of wasps

Lymaenon is a genus of wasps belonging to the family Mymaridae.

The genus has cosmopolitan distribution.

Species:

- Lymaenon hoplites Debauche, 1948
- Lymaenon spinozai Girault, 1912
- Lymaenon vladimiri Triapitsyn, 2013
