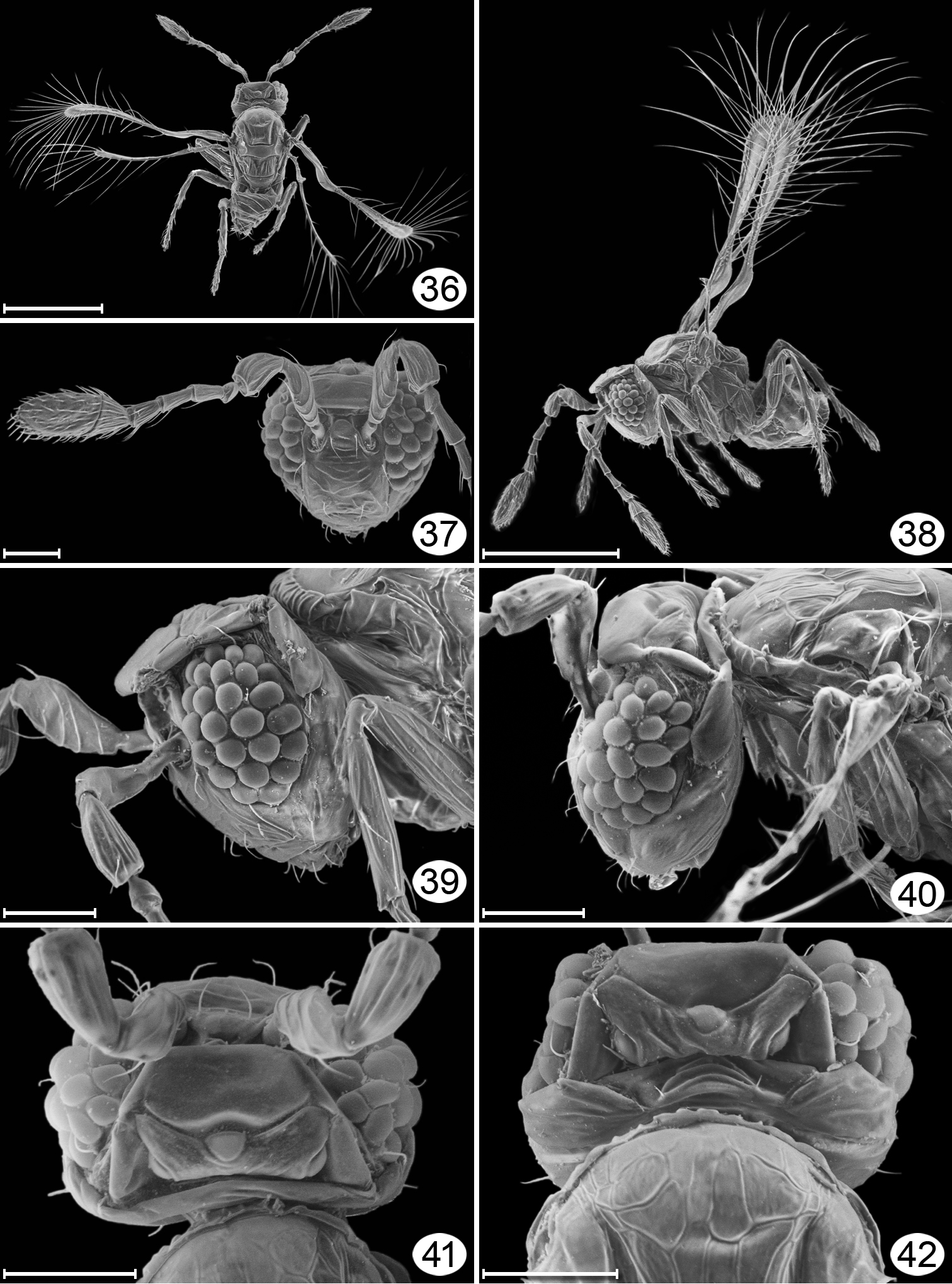

Scientific classification
- Kingdom: Animalia
- Phylum: Arthropoda
- Clade: Pancrustacea
- Class: Insecta
- Order: Hymenoptera
- Family: Mymaridae
- Genus: Kikiki; Huber & Beardsley, 2000
- Species: K. huna

Binomial name
- Kikiki huna Huber, 2000

= Kikiki =

Genus of wasps

Kikiki is a genus of fairyfly wasps containing a single species, Kikiki huna, known from Hawaii, Costa Rica, Nagarcoil, and Trinidad. At 0.15 mm (0.0059 in) (150 μm), it is the smallest flying insect known as of 2019. It is a close relative of wasps in the genus Tinkerbella. It was discovered in the Hawaiian Islands by John T. Huber and John W. Beardsley, and published in 2000. The name Kikiki huna consists of two Hawaiian words that both carry the meaning 'tiny bit'.

Female Kikiki huna have wings with feathery hair-like appendages attached to a stem. The males of this species do not fly, and do not have any wings.

The viscous effects of air on a wing increase at smaller sizes, so an insect 1mm or smaller moves through the air as a bumblebee would move through mineral oil.

"The smallest example of powered flight currently known to humans is that of miniature insects, with wing lengths typically no greater than 1 mm. Flight in this domain is characterized by Reynolds numbers of the order of 10, meaning that viscous flow effects are more pronounced and, consequently, representative lift-to-drag ratios are significantly low. Most notably, at miniature scales, there is a transition from insects with wings made of continuous membranes, to wings predominantly made up of bristled appendages. Yet, there remains very little understanding of how the structural arrangement of bristled wings interacts with the aerodynamics. In addition to their unique wing morphologies, the wing kinematics employed by miniature insects are also distinct. While flight is classically characterized via a lift force as the primary component for counteracting weight, miniature insects use swimming-like flapping profiles, in which drag plays a distinctly more pronounced role in opposing gravity."

== See also ==
- Dicopomorpha echmepterygis – the smallest known insect
- Smallest organisms
