= Gonatocerus io =

Scientific classification
- Kingdom: Animalia
- Phylum: Arthropoda
- Clade: Pancrustacea
- Class: Insecta
- Order: Hymenoptera
- Family: Mymaridae
- Genus: Gonatocerus
- Species: G. io

Binomial name
- Gonatocerus io Girault, 1915

Species of insect

Gonatocerus io is a species of fairyfly within the family Mymaridae. Its distribution is in Australia, where a female was caught in a forest in Capeville, Queensland.
