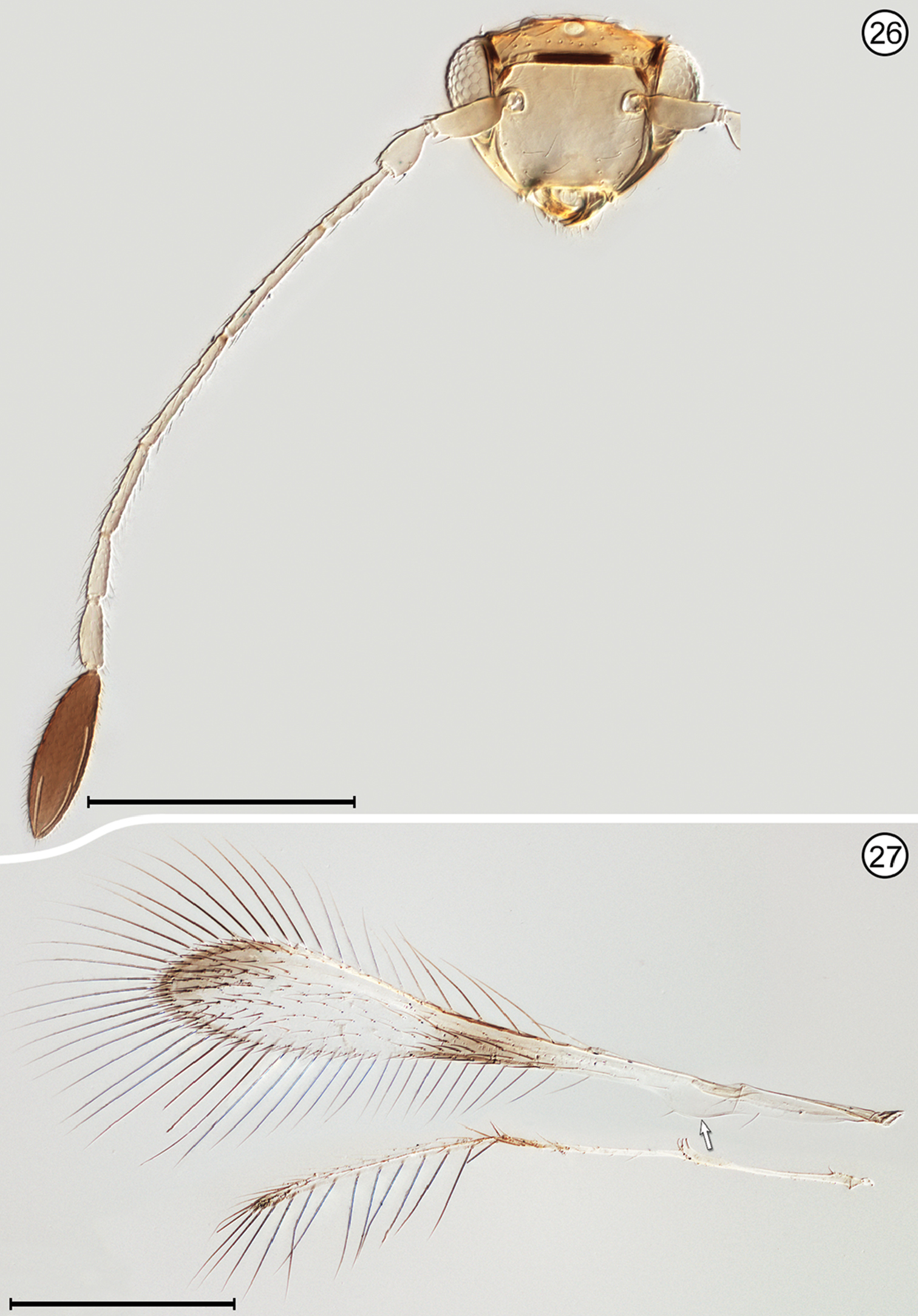
- head and wings of Palaeoneura bagicha

Scientific classification
- Domain: Eukaryota
- Kingdom: Animalia
- Phylum: Arthropoda
- Class: Insecta
- Order: Hymenoptera
- Family: Mymaridae
- Genus: Palaeoneura; Waterhouse, 1915

= Palaeoneura =

Genus of wasps

Palaeoneura is a genus of wasps belonging to the family Mymaridae.

The species of this genus are found in Northern America and Australia.

Species:

- Palaeoneura durwest Triapitsyn, 2010
- Palaeoneura evanescens Waterhouse, 1915
- Palaeoneura frater Triapitsyn, 2021
- Palaeoneura gloriosa Huber, 2009
- Palaeoneura interrupta Waterhouse, 1915
- Palaeoneura markhoddlei Triapitsyn, 2018
- Palaeoneura mymaripennis Dozier, 1933
- Palaeoneura turneri Waterhouse, 1915
