= Anagrus optabilis =

Scientific classification
- Kingdom: Animalia
- Phylum: Arthropoda
- Clade: Pancrustacea
- Class: Insecta
- Order: Hymenoptera
- Family: Mymaridae
- Genus: Anagrus
- Species: A. optabilis

Binomial name
- Anagrus optabilis Perkins 1905

Synonyms
- Paranagrus optabilis

Species of wasp

Anagrus optabilis is a species of fairyfly. It is an egg parasitoid of Perkinsiella saccharicida, Sogatella furcifera, Nilaparvata lugens, and Nilaparvata muiri. Females are capable of reproducing through parthenogenesis, although the species does also sexually reproduce.
