= Eustochus cinctus =

Scientific classification
- Kingdom: Animalia
- Phylum: Arthropoda
- Clade: Pancrustacea
- Class: Insecta
- Order: Hymenoptera
- Family: Mymaridae
- Genus: Eustochus
- Species: E. cinctus

Binomial name
- Eustochus cinctus (Walker, 1846)

Synonyms
- Ceraphractus cinctus Walker, 1846; Caraphractus flavicollis Hellén, 1974; Caraphractus natans (Lubbock); Cosmocoma natans (Lubbock, 1864); Polynema natans Lubbock, 1864; Valkerella natans (Lubbock, 1864); Caraphractus reductus Rimsky-Korsakov, 1920

Species of wasp

Eustochus cinctus is a species of fairyfly. It is found in the Palearctic as well as Canada and the United States.
