= Anaphes nipponicus =

Scientific classification
- Kingdom: Animalia
- Phylum: Arthropoda
- Class: Insecta
- Order: Hymenoptera
- Family: Mymaridae
- Genus: Anaphes
- Species: A. nipponicus

Binomial name
- Anaphes nipponicus Kuwayama, 1932

Species of wasp

Anaphes nipponicus is a species of fairyfly from Eastern Asia. It is an egg parasitoid of the beetle Oulema oryzae.
