= Polynemoidea =

Polynemoidea Temporal range: 23.03–Recent Ma

Scientific classification
- Kingdom: Animalia
- Phylum: Arthropoda
- Class: Insecta
- Order: Hymenoptera
- Family: Mymaridae
- Genus: Polynemoidea; Girault, 1913

Genus of insects

Polynemoidea is a genus of fairyflies within the family Mymaridae. There are currently 6 species assigned to the genus, with an extinct species, P. mexicana, being found to have lived 23.03 MYA.

== Species ==
- Polynemoidea domestica Girault, 1931
- Polynemoidea incerta Girault, 1938
- Polynemoidea lincolni Girault, 1913
- Polynemoidea mexicana Doutt, 1973
- Polynemoidea particoxae Girault, 1938
- Polynemoidea varicornis Girault, 1913
