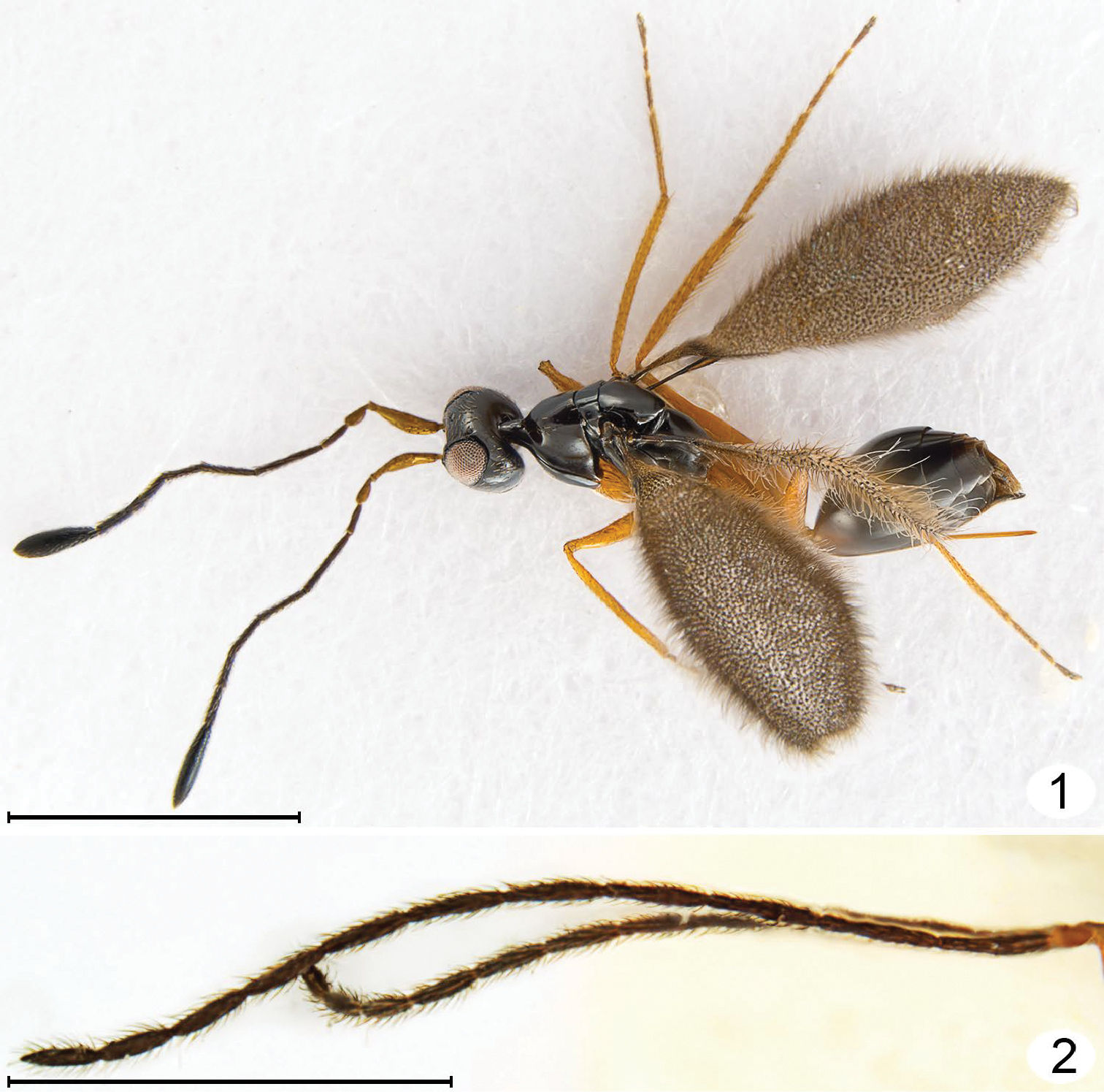
- Mymarilla wollastoni: (1) Female exhibiting the extraordinarily densely hairy (setose) and domed forewings peculiar to the species. (2) Close-up of the thread-like antennae of a male. Scale bar = 1000 μm

Scientific classification
- Kingdom: Animalia
- Phylum: Arthropoda
- Class: Insecta
- Order: Hymenoptera
- Family: Mymaridae
- Genus: Mymarilla; Westwood, 1879
- Species: M. wollastoni

Binomial name
- Mymarilla wollastoni Westwood, 1879

= Mymarilla =

Mymarilla wollastoni

Genus of wasps

Mymarilla wollastoni is a species of fairyflies endemic to the island of Saint Helena in the southern Atlantic. It is the only species classified under the genus Mymarilla. They are characterized by relatively smooth, shiny black bodies and densely hairy (setose) and domed forewings. They bear superficial resemblance to members of the genus Cremnomymar which inhabit similar habitats of remote wind-swept oceanic islands, but they are believed to be most closely related to the genus Stephanodes. They were first described by the English entomologist John Obadiah Westwood in 1879, from specimens collected from low-lying plants in Saint Helena.
