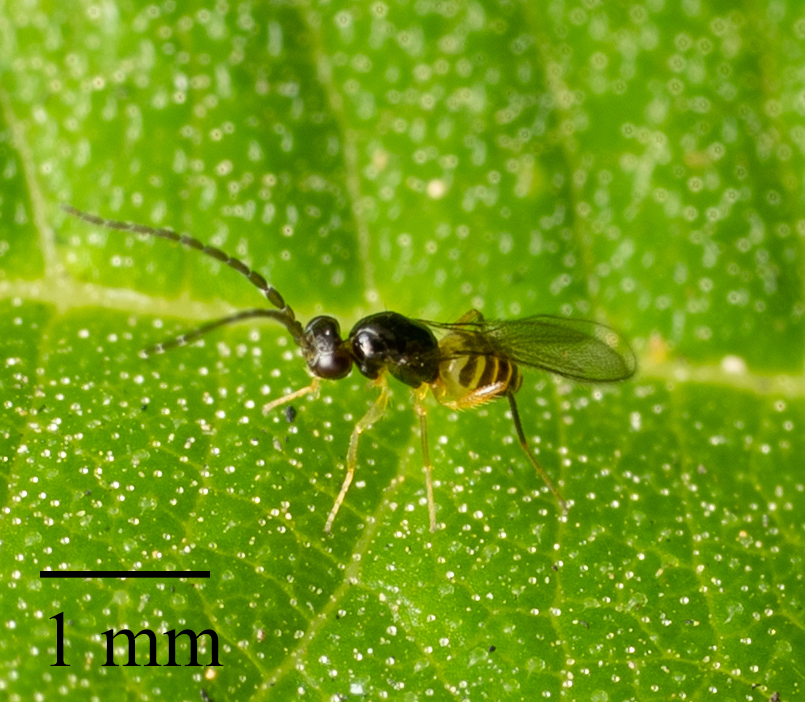

Scientific classification
- Kingdom: Animalia
- Phylum: Arthropoda
- Clade: Pancrustacea
- Class: Insecta
- Order: Hymenoptera
- Family: Mymaridae
- Genus: Gonatocerus
- Species: G. ashmeadi

Binomial name
- Gonatocerus ashmeadi Girault, 1915

Synonyms
- Cosmocomoidea ashmeadi (Girault, 1915)

= Gonatocerus ashmeadi =

Species of wasp

Gonatocerus ashmeadi is a species of fairyfly, a hymenopteran in the family Mymaridae. New name is Cosmocomoidea ashmeadi. Its natural range is Florida, Louisiana, northeastern Mexico, Mississippi, North Carolina, and eastern Texas. It has spread to southern and central California. It is used to control the glassy-winged sharpshooter Homalodisca vitripennis (Hemiptera: Cicadellidae).
