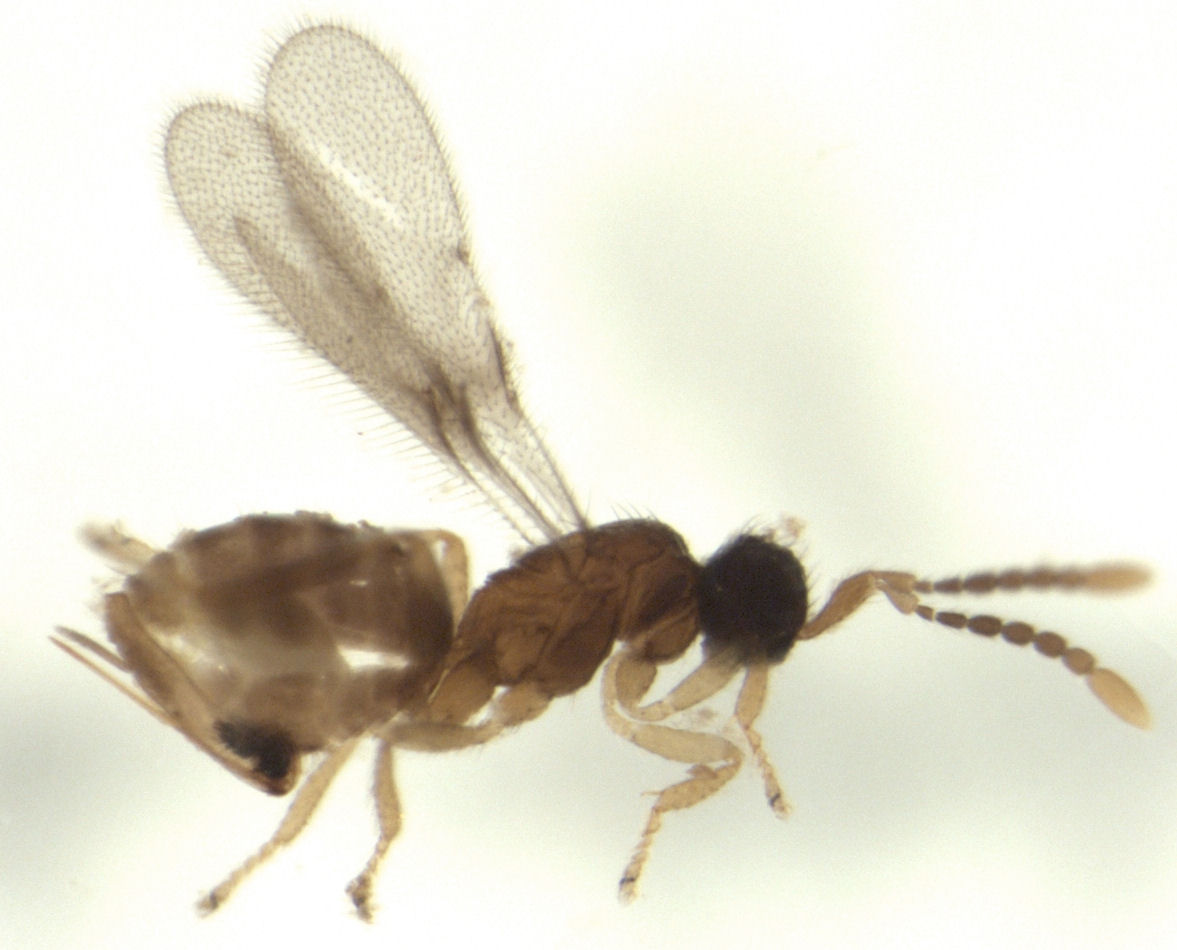

Scientific classification
- Domain: Eukaryota
- Kingdom: Animalia
- Phylum: Arthropoda
- Class: Insecta
- Order: Hymenoptera
- Superfamily: Chalcidoidea
- Family: Mymaridae
- Genus: Acmotemnus
- Species: A. luteiclava

Binomial name
- Acmotemnus luteiclava Noyes & Valentine, 1989

= Acmotemnus =

Species of wasp

Acmotemnus is a genus of fairyflies in the family Mymaridae. This genus has a single species, Acmotemnus luteiclava, found in New Zealand.
