= Anagroidea =

Scientific classification
- Kingdom: Animalia
- Phylum: Arthropoda
- Class: Insecta
- Order: Hymenoptera
- Family: Mymaridae
- Genus: Anagroidea; Girault, 1915

Genus of insects

Anagroidea is a genus of fairyflies within the family Mymaridae. There are currently 5 species assigned to the genus.

== Species ==
- Anagroidea boweni Yoshimoto, 1990
- Anagroidea dryas Girault, 1938
- Anagroidea dubia (Girault, 1913)
- Anagroidea himalayana (Mani & Saraswat, 1973)
- Anagroidea marina Triapitsyn & Berezovskiy, 2002
