= Gonatocerus tuberculifemur =

Scientific classification
- Domain: Eukaryota
- Kingdom: Animalia
- Phylum: Arthropoda
- Class: Insecta
- Order: Hymenoptera
- Family: Mymaridae
- Genus: Gonatocerus
- Species: G. tuberculifemur

Binomial name
- Gonatocerus tuberculifemur (Ogloblin, 1957)

Species of wasp

Gonatocerus tuberculifemur is a species of fairyfly. It is an egg parasitoid of Tapajosa rubromarginata, a leafhopper.
