= Anaphes =

Scientific classification
- Kingdom: Animalia
- Phylum: Arthropoda
- Clade: Pancrustacea
- Class: Insecta
- Order: Hymenoptera
- Family: Mymaridae
- Genus: Anaphes; Haliday, 1833

Genus of wasps

Figures 6–8; Anaphes sp., female 6 head, anterior + antenna 7 antenna 8 wings

Anaphes is a genus of fairyflies belonging to the family Mymaridae. It was first described by Alexander Henry Haliday in 1833.

The genus has a cosmopolitan distribution.

== Species ==
Species in the genus include:

- Anaphes crassipennis Soyka, 1946
- Anaphes luna Girault, 1914
- Anaphes nipponicus Kuwayama, 1932
- Anaphes nitens (Girault, 1928)
