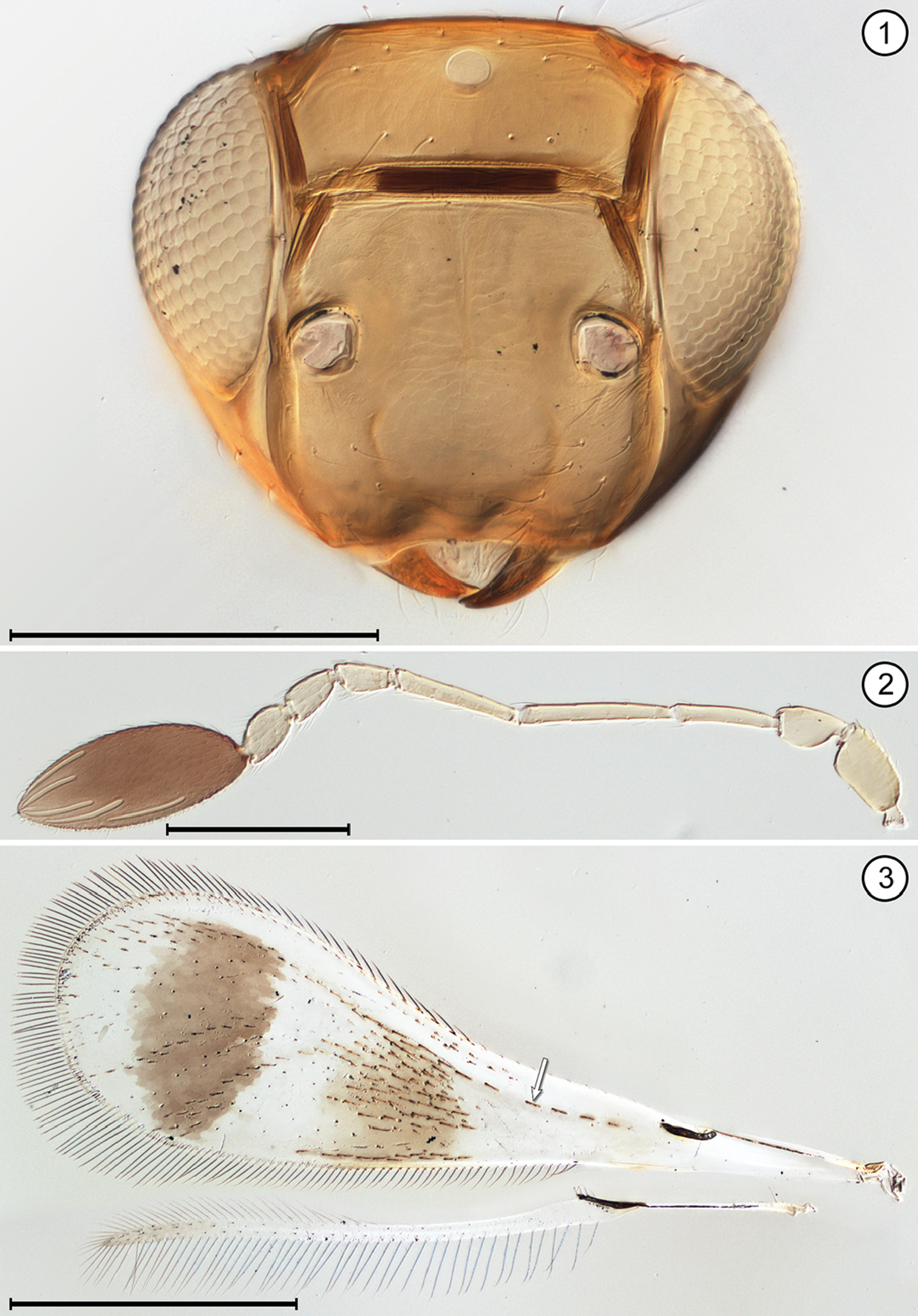
- Acmopolynema orientale

Scientific classification
- Kingdom: Animalia
- Phylum: Arthropoda
- Class: Insecta
- Order: Hymenoptera
- Family: Mymaridae
- Genus: Acmopolynema; Ogloblin, 1946

= Acmopolynema =

Genus of flies

Acmopolynema is a genus of fairyflies within the family Mymaridae.

== Species ==
- Acmopolynema aberrans Fidalgo 1989
- Acmopolynema bifasciatipenne (Girault 1908)
- Acmopolynema bimaculatum Subba Rao 1989
- Acmopolynema brasiliense (Ashmead 1904)
- Acmopolynema callopterum Fidalgo 1989
- Acmopolynema campylura Xu & Lin 2002
- Acmopolynema carinatum Fidalgo 1989
- Acmopolynema commune Fidalgo 1989
- Acmopolynema delphacivorum Fidalgo 1989
- Acmopolynema gracilicorne Fidalgo 1989
- Acmopolynema helavai Yoshimoto 1990
- Acmopolynema hervali Gomes 1948
- Acmopolynema himalum Hayat & Anis 1999
- Acmopolynema immaculatum Schauff 1981
- Acmopolynema inaequale Fidalgo 1989
- Acmopolynema incognitum (Narayanan, Subba Rao & Kaur 1960)
- Acmopolynema indochinense (Soyka 1956)
- Acmopolynema infuscatum Fidalgo 1989
- Acmopolynema kronidiphagum Fidalgo 1989
- Acmopolynema longicorne Fidalgo 1989
- Acmopolynema longicoxilla Xu & Lin 2002
- Acmopolynema maculatum Subba Rao 1989
- Acmopolynema malabaricum Subba Rao 1989
- Acmopolynema miamiense Schauff 1981
- Acmopolynema michailovskayae Berezovskiy & Triapitsyn 2001
- Acmopolynema mirabile Fidalgo 1989
- Acmopolynema missionicum Fidalgo 1989
- Acmopolynema monicae Mathot 1968
- Acmopolynema nixoni Subba Rao 1989
- Acmopolynema obscuricorne Fidalgo 1989
- Acmopolynema orchidea Triapitsyn & Berezovskiy, 2007
- Acmopolynema orientale (Narayanan, Subba Rao & Kaur 1960)
- Acmopolynema pacificum Berezovskiy & Triapitsyn 2001
- Acmopolynema pecki Yoshimoto 1990
- Acmopolynema perterebrator Fidalgo 1989
- Acmopolynema plaumanni Yoshimoto 1990
- Acmopolynema poecilopterum Fidalgo 1989
- Acmopolynema polyrhiza Fidalgo 1989
- Acmopolynema pseudotachikawai Manickavasagam & Palanivel, 2017
- Acmopolynema pteron Manickavasagam & Palanivel, 2017
- Acmopolynema reticoxilla Xu & Lin 2002
- Acmopolynema rufescens (Ashmead 1904)
- Acmopolynema scapulare Fidalgo 1989
- Acmopolynema sema Schauff 1981
- Acmopolynema tachikawai Taguchi 1971
- Acmopolynema uma Schauff 1981
- Acmopolynema unimaculatum Hayat & Anis 1999
- Acmopolynema ussuricum Berezovskiy & Triapitsyn 2001
- Acmopolynema varium (Girault 1917)
- Acmopolynema vittatipenne (Dozier 1932)
