= Dicopus =

Scientific classification
- Kingdom: Animalia
- Phylum: Arthropoda
- Class: Insecta
- Order: Hymenoptera
- Family: Mymaridae
- Genus: Dicopus; Enock, 1909

Type species
- Dicopus minutissimus

Species
- Dicopus minutissimus Enock, 1955; Dicopus longipes (Subba Rao, 1984); Dicopus kamrani Anwar and Zeya, 2018; Dicopus obesus Anwar and Zeya, 2018; Dicopus gunathilagaraji Manickavasagam and Sankararaman, 2019; Dicopus bidentiscapus Girault, 1931; Dicopus cervus Morley, 1931; Dicopus citri Mercet, 1912; Dicopus halitus Girault, 1911; Dicopus lilliput Mathot, 1972; Dicopus moscovit Triapitsyn, 2015; Dicopus noyesi Manickavasagam, 2011; Dicopus psyche Girault, 1912; Dicopus pygmaeus Doutt, 1974

Genus of wasps

Dicopus is a wasp genus in the family Mymaridae. About 15 species have been described in the genus.
