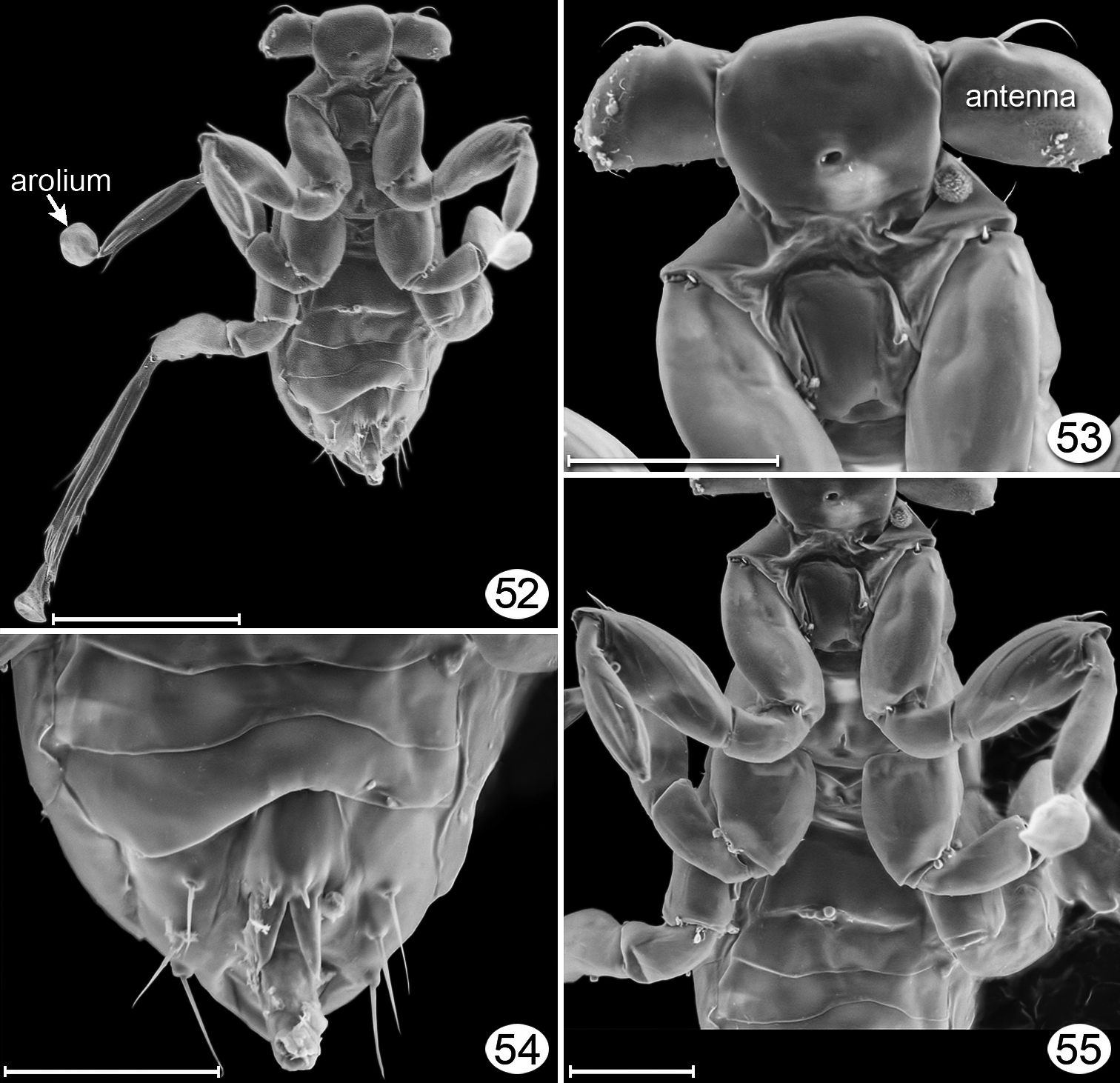
- Dicopomorpha echmepterygis male seen from multiple angles

Scientific classification
- Kingdom: Animalia
- Phylum: Arthropoda
- Clade: Pancrustacea
- Class: Insecta
- Order: Hymenoptera
- Family: Mymaridae
- Genus: Dicopomorpha
- Species: D. echmepterygis

Binomial name
- Dicopomorpha echmepterygis Mockford, 1997

= Dicopomorpha echmepterygis =

Species of wasp

Dicopomorpha echmepterygis is the smallest known insect and a species of parasitoid wasp of the family Mymaridae, which exhibits strong sexual dimorphism. The males are blind, apterous, and their body length is only 40% that of females. With a body length averaging 186 μm (for 8 specimens measured, which ranged from 139 to 240 μm), males of D. echmepterygis have the shortest body length of all known insects (smaller than certain species of Paramecium, amoeba, and shorter than certain bacteria, Thiomargarita magnifica, all of which are single-celled organisms). The measured body length of a female was 550 μm. Dicopomorpha echmepterygis males have relatively long legs and are dull grayish brown, with small heads that lack compound eyes, and unsegmented antennae. Females, however, have entirely black bodies with dusky brown legs and antennae. The antennae are twice as long as for males, and females have fully-functional wings that are narrowed slightly through the middle. The eggs and larvae of this parasitoid are considerably smaller than the adult.

This species, described from Illinois, United States, is an idiobiont parasitoid of the eggs of a lepidopsocid barklouse, Echmepteryx hageni. Of five host eggs dissected, four contained one male and one female, while the fifth contained three males and one female. Adult males appear to mate with their sisters inside the host egg and die without ever leaving the egg. Similar life histories occur in other species. The trichogrammatid Prestwichia aquatica also mates within the host egg, while fig wasps of the family Agaonidae exhibit similar sexual dimorphism and mate within the host fig. Mites of the family Acarophenacidae (e.g. Adactylidium) take this further still, mating inside the body of their mother before they are born.

== See also ==
- Kikiki – the smallest known flying insect
- Smallest organisms
