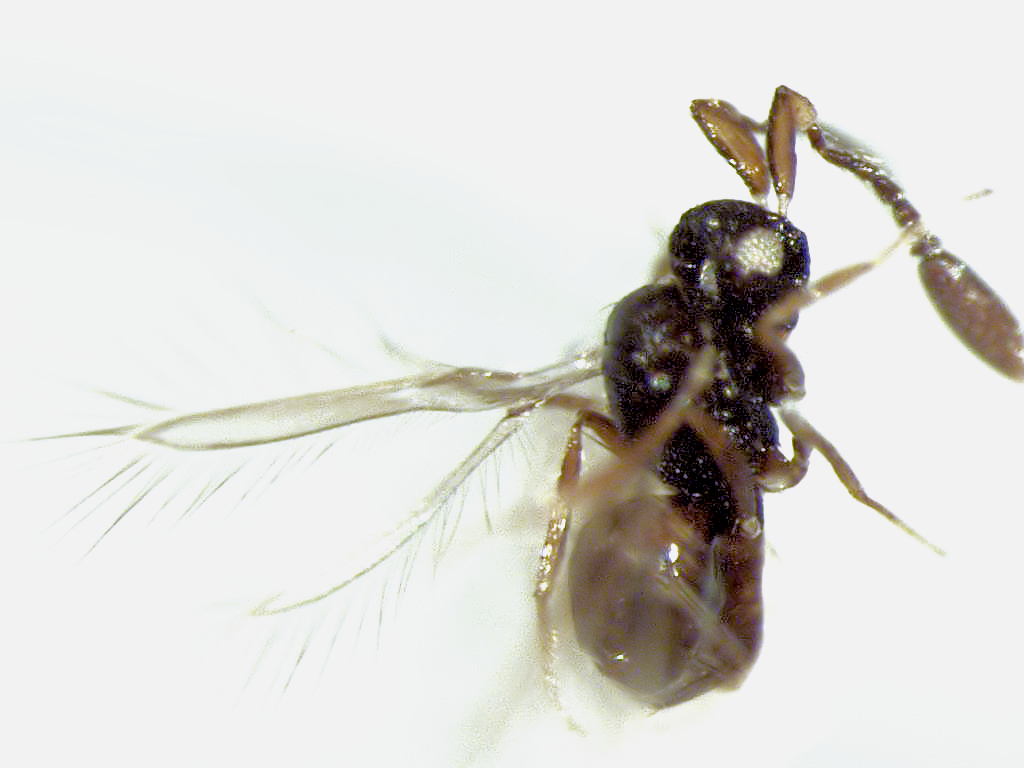

Scientific classification
- Kingdom: Animalia
- Phylum: Arthropoda
- Class: Insecta
- Order: Hymenoptera
- Family: Mymaridae
- Genus: Camptopteroides
- Species: C. verrucosa

Binomial name
- Camptopteroides verrucosa (Noyes & Valentine, 1989)

Synonyms
- Paranagroidea verrucosa Noyes & Valentine, 1989

= Camptopteroides verrucosa =

Species of wasp

Camptopteroides verrucosa is a species of fairyfly (family Mymaridae).
