= Chaetomymar =

Scientific classification
- Kingdom: Animalia
- Phylum: Arthropoda
- Class: Insecta
- Order: Hymenoptera
- Family: Mymaridae
- Genus: Chaetomymar; Ogloblin, 1946

Genus of insects

Chaetomymar is a genus of fairyflies within the family Mymaridae with 9 species currently assigned.

== Species ==
- Chaetomymar bagicha (Narayanan, Subba Rao & Kaur, 1960)
- Chaetomymar dei (Girault, 1922)
- Chaetomymar gracile Prinsloo, 1986
- Chaetomymar hishimoni Taguchi, 1975
- Chaetomymar indopeninsularis (Mani & Saraswat, 1973)
- Chaetomymar kusnezovi Ogloblin, 1946
- Chaetomymar lepidum Annecke & Doutt, 1961
- Chaetomymar sophoniae Huber, 2003
- Chaetomymar tayalum Taguchi, 1975
