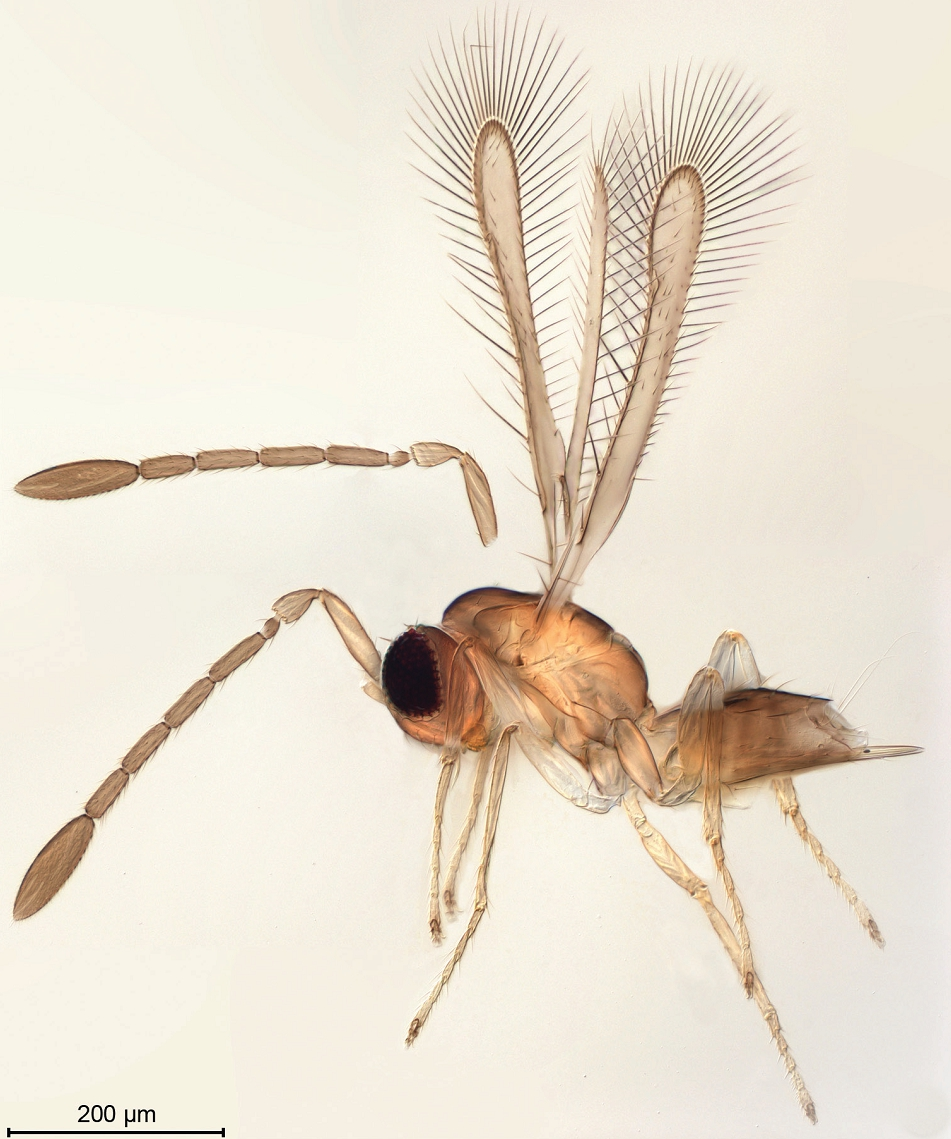
- Arescon sp. from Thailand

Scientific classification
- Kingdom: Animalia
- Phylum: Arthropoda
- Class: Insecta
- Order: Hymenoptera
- Family: Mymaridae
- Genus: Arescon; Walker, 1846

Type species
- Mymar dimidiatus Curtis, 1832

Synonyms
- Leimacis Foerster, 1847; Limacis Foerster, 1856; Xenomymar Crawford, 1913; Neurotes Enock, 1914

= Arescon =

Genus of wasps

Arescon is a genus of fairyflies. It contains the following species:

- Arescon aspidioticola (Ashmead, 1879)
- Arescon clarkei Doutt, 1955
- Arescon chuk S.V. Triapitsyn, 2016
- Arescon confusus S.V. Triapitsyn, 2016
- Arescon dallasi (Ogloblin, 1938)
- Arescon dimidiatus (Curtis, 1832)
- Arescon elongatus (Ogloblin, 1957)
- Arescon enocki (Subba Rao & Kaur, 1959)
- Arescon fulvus Annecke & Doutt, 1961
- Arescon gek S.V. Triapitsyn, 2016
- Arescon iridescens (Enock 1914)
- Arescon leleji S.V. Triapitsyn, 2016
- Arescon maculipennis (Ogloblin, 1957)
- Arescon mudigerensis Subba Rao, 1989
- Arescon peregrinus (Perkins 1910)
- Arescon platensis (Ogloblin, 1957)
- Arescon pusillus (Ogloblin, 1957)
- Arescon urichi (Crawford, 1913)
- Arescon zenit Triapitsyn & Berezovskiy 2003
