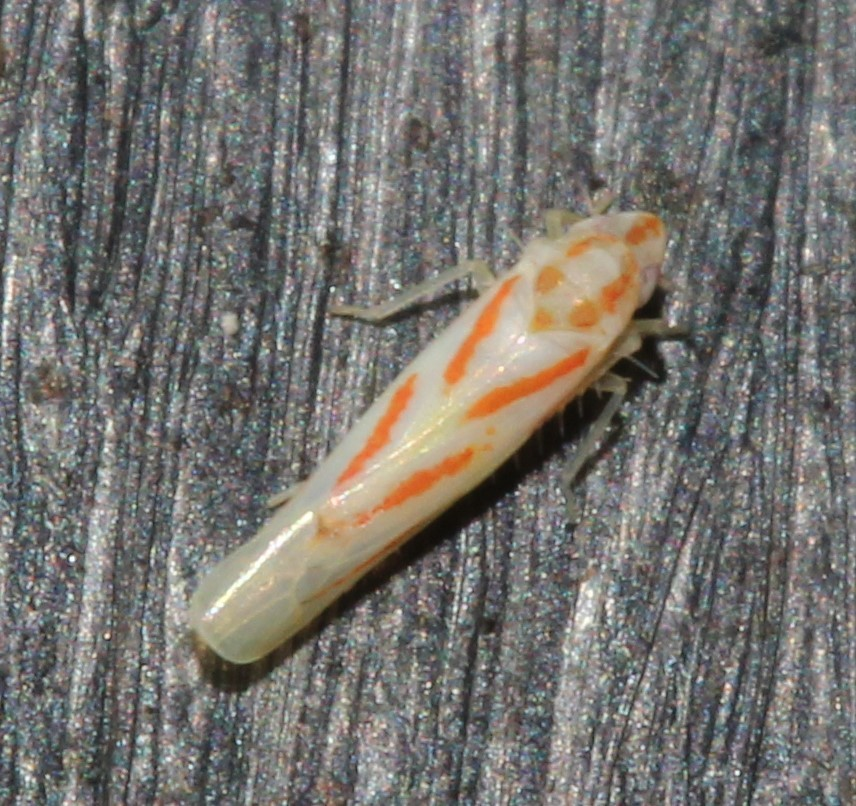

Scientific classification
- Domain: Eukaryota
- Kingdom: Animalia
- Phylum: Arthropoda
- Class: Insecta
- Order: Hemiptera
- Suborder: Auchenorrhyncha
- Family: Cicadellidae
- Genus: Dikrella
- Species: D. cruentata

Binomial name
- Dikrella cruentata (Gillette, 1898)

Synonyms
- Dicraneura cruentata Gillette, 1898

= Dikrella cruentata =

Species of leafhopper

Dikrella cruentata, the blackberry leafhopper, is a species of leafhopper belonging to the family Cicadellidae.
