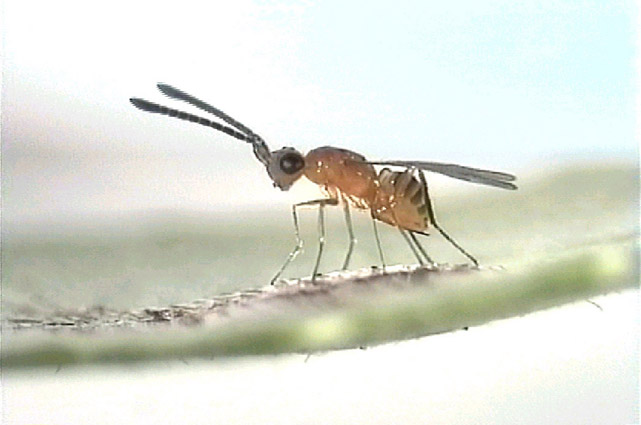

Scientific classification
- Kingdom: Animalia
- Phylum: Arthropoda
- Class: Insecta
- Order: Hymenoptera
- Family: Mymaridae
- Genus: Gonatocerus
- Species: G. triguttatus

Binomial name
- Gonatocerus triguttatus Girault, 1916

= Gonatocerus triguttatus =

Species of wasp

Gonatocerus triguttatus is a species of fairyfly. It is an egg parasitoid of the glassy-winged sharpshooter, Homalodisca vitripennis. It was originally described from Caroni County, Trinidad.
