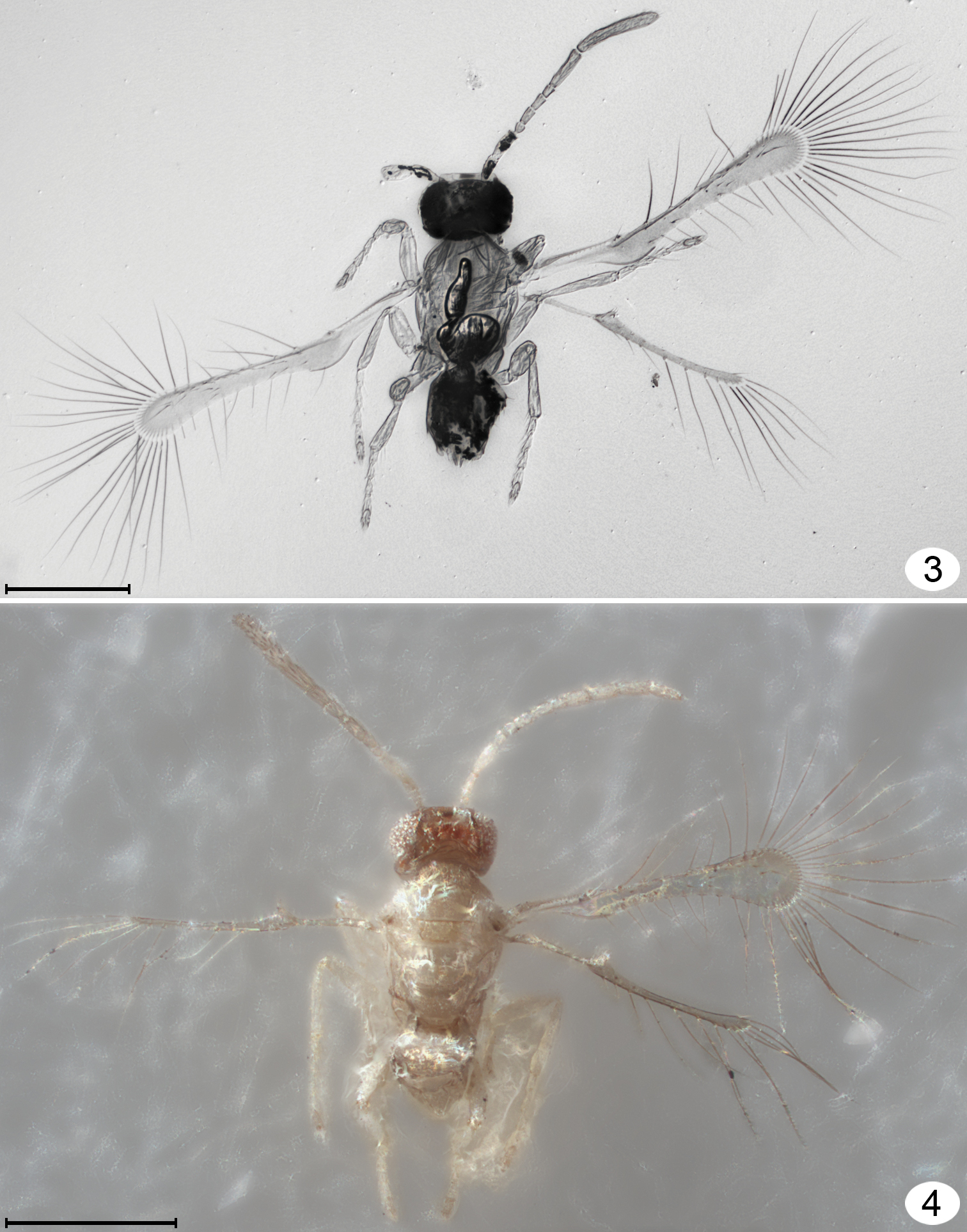

Scientific classification
- Kingdom: Animalia
- Phylum: Arthropoda
- Clade: Pancrustacea
- Class: Insecta
- Order: Hymenoptera
- Family: Mymaridae
- Genus: Tinkerbella; Huber & Noyes, 2013
- Species: T. nana

Binomial name
- Tinkerbella nana Huber & Noyes, 2013

= Tinkerbella =

Tinkerbella nana

Genus of wasps

Tinkerbella is a genus of fairy wasps, containing the single species Tinkerbella nana from Costa Rica. It is one of the smallest known flying arthropods and belongs to the family Mymaridae.

== History ==
It was identified by a team led by John Huber at the Canadian National Collection of Insects and John Noyes at the Natural History Museum. Noyes collected it during a scientific expedition in the tropical forests of Costa Rica. Tinkerbella specimens have been added to the museum collection of about 1.5 million wasps, which are used by researchers worldwide. The scientific description of Tinkerbella nana was published in the Journal of Hymenoptera Research. The genus was named after the fairy Tinker Bell in the 1904 play Peter and Wendy (a.k.a. Peter Pan) by J.M. Barrie, and the specific epithet nana refers to a dog in the same story, as well as referencing the Greek word for a dwarf.

Specimens were collected in Costa Rica by Noyes using a heavy triangular sweep net fitted with a galvanized metal screen with 4 mm mesh over the opening. Sweeping was done by gently dragging the net through vegetation and dumping the net contents at five-minute intervals into 80% ethanol in a sturdy polythene bag to reduce damage to insects in the debris. Sweeping was done for two-hour periods except during rainfall, so different samples could be compared, if necessary. The samples were sorted later in a laboratory using a method that ensured all the smallest Hymenoptera were found.

== Appearance ==
Tinkerbella nana is 250 micrometres (0.0098 inches) long, 2.5 times the width of a human hair.

== See also ==
- Smallest organisms

== Sources ==
- Guardian article on Tinkerbella nana
- http://www.nhm.ac.uk/about-us/news/2013/april/tinkerbella-nana-a-new-species-of-fairyfly121027.html
- http://news.discovery.com/animals/insects/tinkerbell-the-fairyfly-is-invisible-to-humans-130424.htm (1) May 1, 2013
- http://www.pensoft.net/news.php?n=242&SESID=cbe29eca1eeb13a450379946f61da5da (3) May 1, 2013
- https://www.sciencedaily.com/releases/2013/04/130424103050.htm (4) May 1, 2013
- http://www.alaskadispatch.com/article/20130425/tinkerbella-nana-costa-rican-wasp-gets-disney-treatment (5) May 1, 2013
- http://planetsave.com/2013/04/28/newly-discovered-tinkerbell-fly-is-out-of-sight-literally/ (6) May 1, 2013
- rawstory.com (7) May 1, 2013
- http://esciencenews.com/sources/physorg/2013/05/01/tinkerbella.nana.a.new.species.fairyfly (8) May 1, 2013
- http://news.softpedia.com/news/Tinkerbella-Nana-Is-the-Latest-Addition-to-the-World-of-Fairyflies-348359.shtml (9) May 1, 2013
- http://www.itechpost.com/articles/8284/20130424/fairy-tiny-new-insect.htm (10) May 1, 2013
- (11) May 1, 2013
- https://phys.org/news/2013-05-tinkerbella-nana-species-fairyfly.html (12) May 1, 2013
- https://www.nasw.org/new-microscopic-fairyfly-tinkerbella-nana-feasts-insect-eggs-measures-latinos-post (13) May 1, 2013
- http://frenchtribune.com/teneur/1317643-researchers-discover-extremely-tiny-fairyflies-species (14) May 1, 2013
- http://www.km.ru/science-tech/2013/04/26/issledovaniya-rossiiskikh-i-zarubezhnykh-uchenykh/709805-novyi-vid-parazitic (15) (Russian) May 1, 2013
