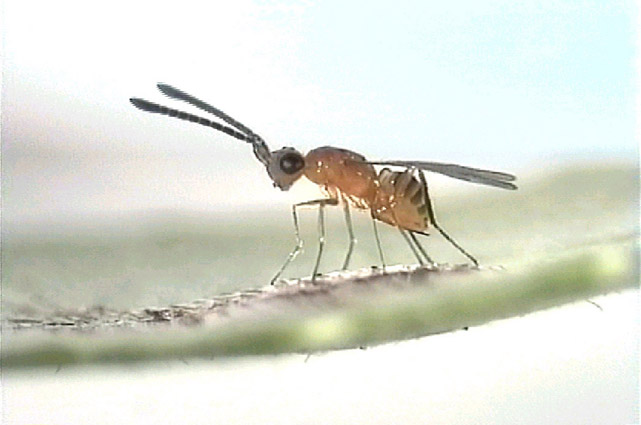
- Gonatocerus triguttatus

Scientific classification
- Kingdom: Animalia
- Phylum: Arthropoda
- Clade: Pancrustacea
- Class: Insecta
- Order: Hymenoptera
- Family: Mymaridae
- Genus: Gonatocerus; Nees, 1834

= Gonatocerus =

Gonatocerus Temporal range: Lutetian–Recent

Genus of wasps

Gonatocerus is a genus of fairyflies in the family Mymaridae. There are at least 260 described species in Gonatocerus.

== See also ==
- List of Gonatocerus species
