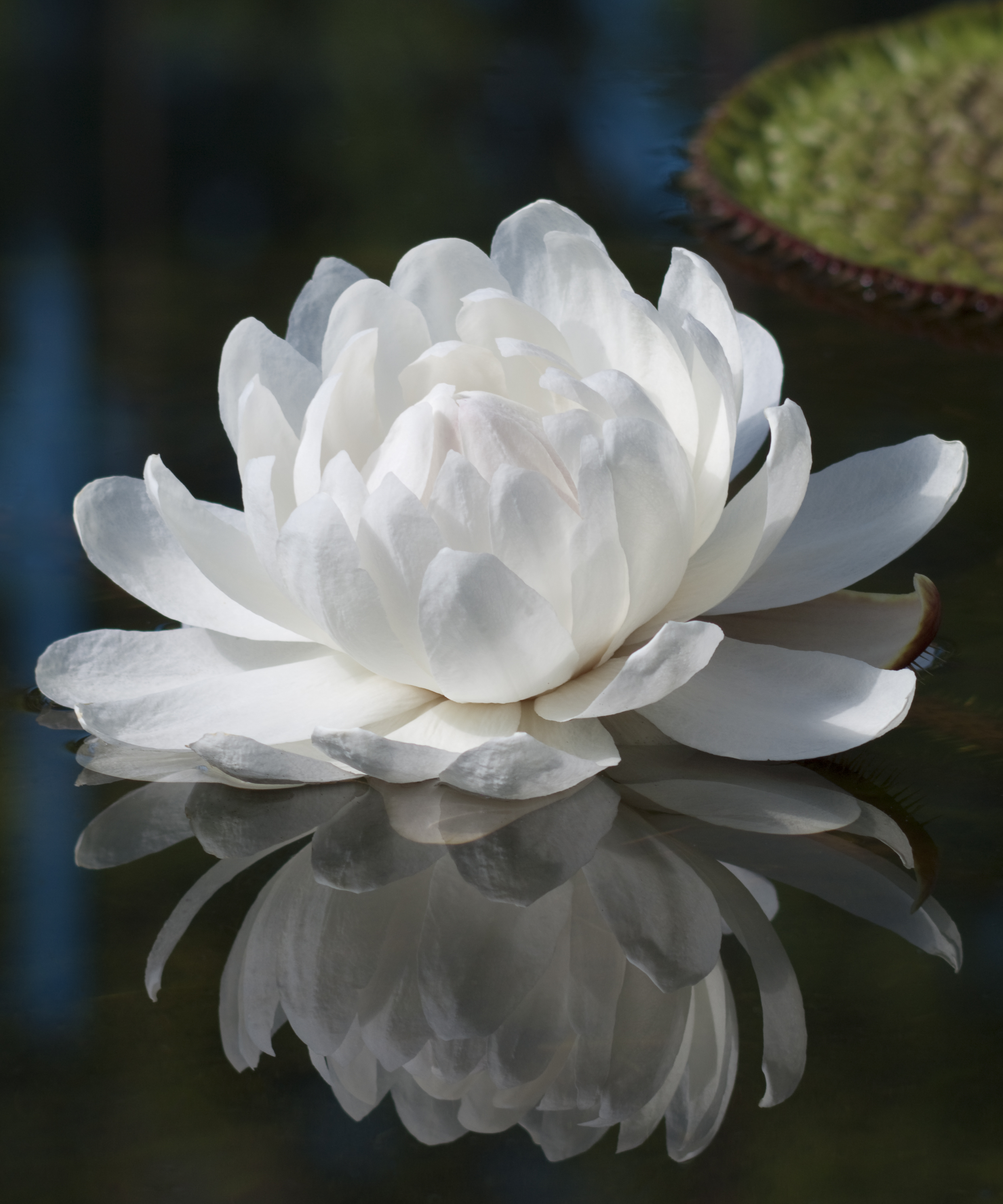
- Victoria amazonica at the Adelaide Botanic Garden

Scientific classification
- Kingdom: Plantae
- Clade: Tracheophytes
- Clade: Angiosperms
- Order: Nymphaeales
- Family: Nymphaeaceae
- Genus: Victoria
- Species: V. amazonica

Binomial name
- Victoria amazonica (Poepp.) J.C. Sowerby

Synonyms
- Euryale amazonica Poepp; Nymphaea victoria M.R.Schomb. ex Lindl.; Victoria regina R.H.Schomb.; Victoria regia Lindl.

= Victoria amazonica =

Queen Victoria's water lily

Species of plant

Victoria amazonica ("giant water lily") is a species of flowering plant, the second largest in the water lily family Nymphaeaceae. It is called Vitória-Régia or Iaupê-Jaçanã ("the jacana's waterlily") in Brazil and Atun Sisac ("great flower") in Inca (Quechua). Its native region is tropical South America, specifically Guyana and the Amazon Basin.

== Taxonomy ==
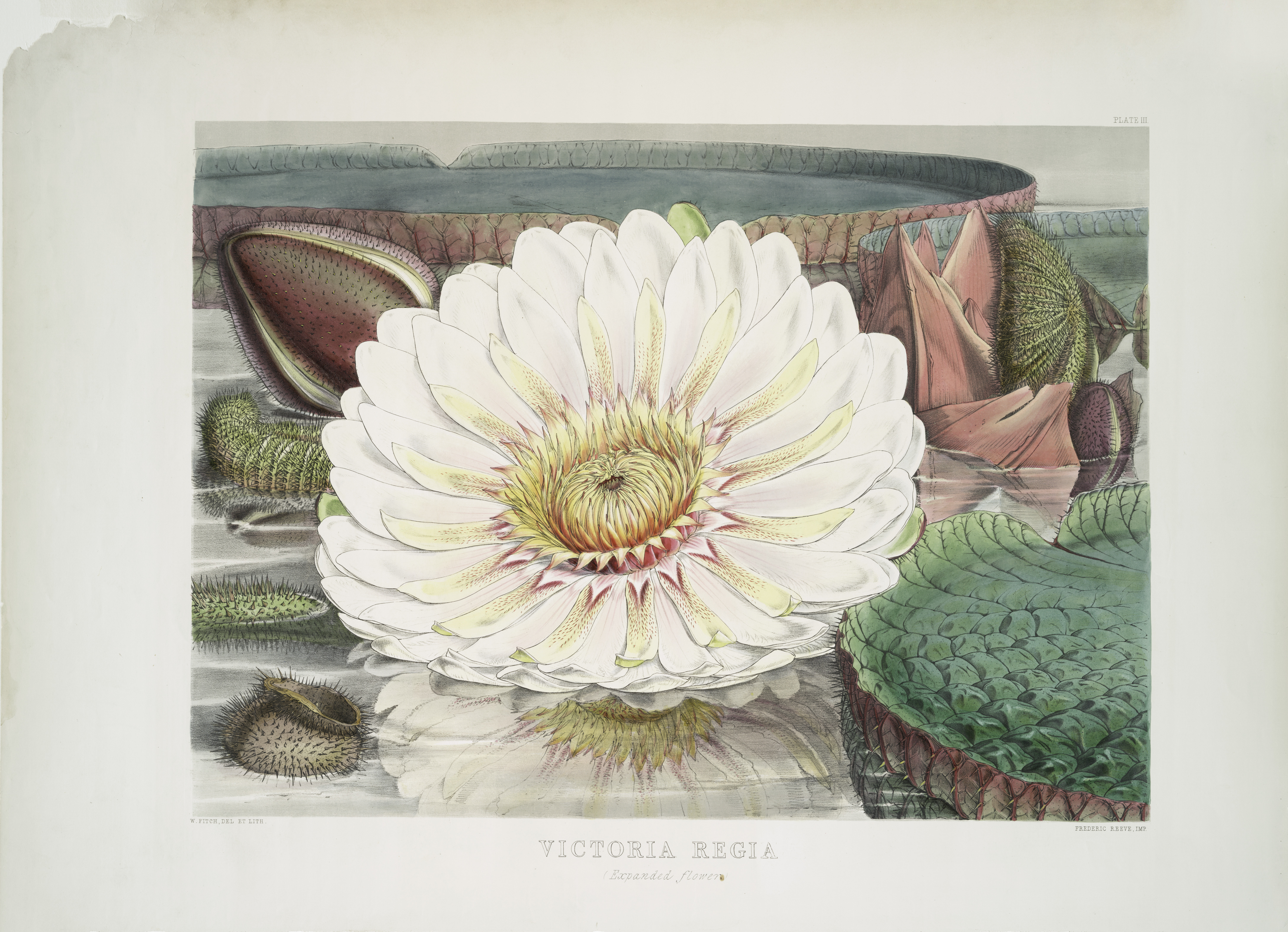
Illustration by Fitch, 1851

The species is a member of the genus Victoria, placed in the family Nymphaeaceae or sometimes in the Euryalaceae. The first published description of the genus was by John Lindley in October 1837, based on specimens of this plant returned from British Guiana by Robert Schomburgk. Lindley named the genus after the newly ascended Queen Victoria, and the species Victoria regia. The spelling in Schomburgk's description in Athenaeum, published the month before, was given as Victoria Regina. Despite this spelling being adopted by the Botanical Society of London for their new emblem, Lindley's was the version used throughout the 19th century.

An earlier account of the species, Euryale amazonica by Eduard Friedrich Poeppig, in 1832, described an affinity with Euryale ferox. A collection and description were also made by the French botanist Aimé Bonpland in 1825. In 1850 James De Carle Sowerby recognized Poeppig's earlier description and transferred its epithet amazonica. The new name was rejected by Lindley. The current name, Victoria amazonica, did not come into widespread use until the 20th century.

=== Cytology ===
The diploid chromosome count of Victoria amazonica is 20.

== Description ==
Victoria amazonica has very large leaves (lamina; commonly called "pads" or "lily pads"), up to 3 m (10 ft) in diameter, that float on the water's surface on a submerged stalk (petiole), 7–8 m (23–26 ft) in length, rivaling the length of the green anaconda, a snake local to its habitat. These leaves are enormously buoyant if the weight is distributed evenly over the entire surface of the leaf (as by a piece of plywood, which should be of neutral buoyancy). In 1896 a V. amazonica leaf at Tower Grove Park, Saint Louis, Missouri bore the "unprecedented" weight of 110 kg (250 lb). However, in 1867 William Sowerby of Regents Park Botanic Garden in London placed 194 kg (428 lb) on a leaf only 168 cm (66 in) in diameter. One leaf of a specimen grown in Ghent, Belgium bore a load of 226 kg (498 lb) It is the second-largest waterlily in the world. The leaves and flowers spring forth from a perennial rhizome up to 20 cm (7.9 in) thick. The rhizome can live at least 7 years, but often much shorter (frequently annual) due to seasonal fluctuations in water level. Because of the leaf's air spaces, the leaf is surprisingly light. Laurent Saint-Cricq (pen name "Paul Marcoy") found a leaf 2.6 m (8 ft 6 in) diameter weighed only 6.1 kg (13 lb).

V. amazonica is native to the still and slow-moving waters of the Amazon River basin and some other drainage basins of northern South America, growing in water up to 5.25 m deep. In their native habitat, the flowers first begin to open as the sun starts to set and can take up to 48 hours to fully open. These flowers can grow up to 40 cm (16 in) in diameter and 1.6 kg (3.5 lb) in weight, exceeded in mass only by members of the genus Rafflesia. All of the flowers of one particular plant will, on a given evening, all be in the female phase or all in the male phase, so that pollination must be by a different individual, precluding self-pollination.

The stem and underside of the leaves are coated with many small spines to defend itself from fish and other herbivores that dwell underwater, although they can also play an offensive role in crushing rival plants in the vicinity as the lily unfolds as it aggressively seeks and hogs sunlight, depriving other plants directly beneath its leaves of such vital resource and significantly darkening the waters below. Younger giant water lilies are even known to swing their spiny stalks and buds around as they grow to forcibly make space for themselves.

== Ecology ==
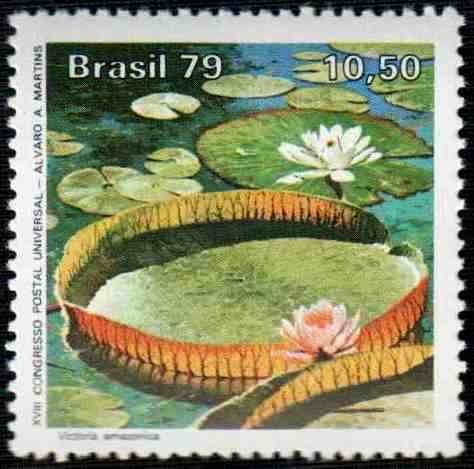
Illustration on a stamp

Each plant continues to produce flowers for a full growing season, and they have co-evolved a mutualistic relationship with a species of scarab beetle of the genus Cyclocephala as a pollinator. All the buds in a single patch will begin to open at the same time and as they do, they give off a fruity smell. At this point, the flower petals are white, and the beetles are attracted both to the colour and the smell of the flower. At nightfall the flower stops producing the odor, and it closes, trapping the beetles inside its carpellary appendages. Here, the stamens are protected by the paracarpels, and for the next day, the flower continues to remain closed. The cavity in which the beetle is trapped is composed of a spongy, starchy tissue that provides nourishment for the beetle. During this time, anthocyanins start to be released by the plant, which in turn changes the petals from white to a reddish pink colour, a sign that the flower will have been pollinated. As the beetle feeds inside the flower, the stamens fall inward, and the anthers, which have already fallen, drop pollen on the stamens. During the evening of the second day, the flowers will have opened enough to release the beetle, and as it pushes its way through the stamens, it becomes covered in pollen. These insects will then go on to find a newly opened water lily and pollinate with the pollen they are carrying from the previous flower. This process was described in detail by Sir Ghillean Prance and Jorge Arius.

=== Conservation status ===
Victoria amazonica has not yet been formally evaluated for the IUCN Red List, but a 2022 assessment proposed it as Least Concern (LC) due to its wide distribution across the Amazon basin. Potential threats include deforestation and climate change impacts on wetland ecosystems, though it is not currently considered endangered.

== Cultivation ==
V. amazonica is cultivated in botanical gardens worldwide, requiring warm water temperatures of 29–32°C (85–90°F) for optimal growth; mature plants tolerate slightly cooler conditions (24–27°C or 75–80°F). Propagation is primarily by seed, which should be stored submerged in water and scarified to accelerate germination. Rhizome division is also possible during the growing season. In temperate regions, it is grown as an annual in containers with organically rich loam substrate in still water 1–3 m deep.

== History ==
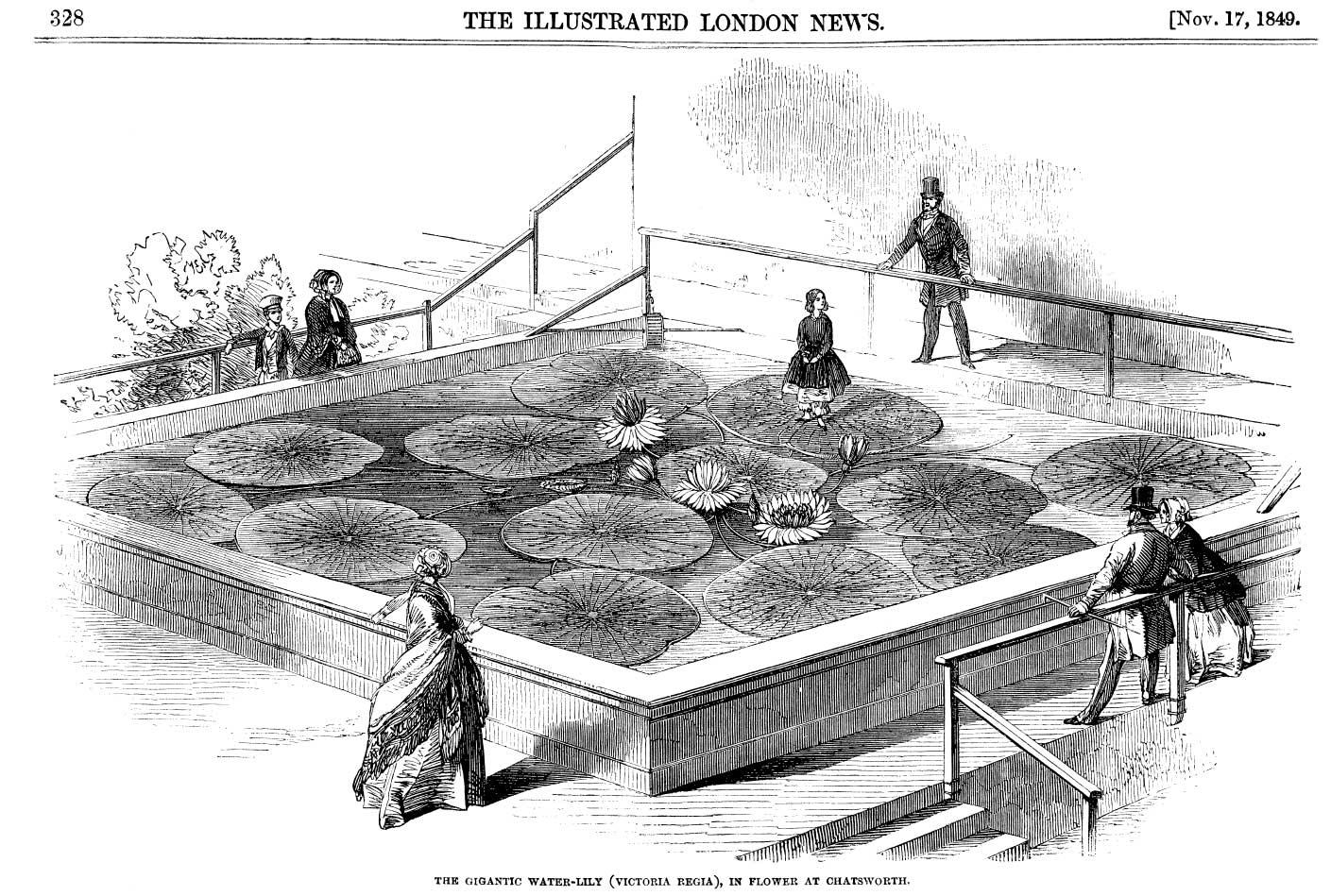
"On unbent leaf in fairy guise, Reflected in the water, Beloved, admired by hearts and eyes, Stands Annie, Paxton's daughter...": "The Gigantic Waterlily (Victoria Regia), In Flower At Chatsworth", 1849

Victoria regia, as it was named, was described by Tadeáš Haenke in 1801. It was once the subject of rivalry between Victorian gardeners in England. Always on the lookout for a new species with which to impress their peers, Victorian "gardeners" such as the Duke of Devonshire and the Duke of Northumberland started a friendly competition to become the first to cultivate and bring to flower this large lily. In the end, the two aforementioned dukes became the first to achieve this, Joseph Paxton (for the Duke of Devonshire) being the first in November 1849 by replicating the lily's warm swampy habitat, and a "Mr Ivison" the second and more constantly successful (for Northumberland) at Syon House.

The species captured the public's imagination and was the subject of several dedicated monographs. The botanical illustrations of cultivated specimens in Fitch and W.J. Hooker's 1851 work Victoria Regia received critical acclaim in the Athenaeum, "they are accurate, and they are beautiful". "The Duke of Devonshire presented Queen Victoria with one of the first of these flowers and named it in her honour. The lily, with ribbed undersurface and leaves veining "like transverse girders and supports", "as Paxton's inspiration for The Crystal Palace, a building four times the size of St. Peter's in Rome."

It is depicted in the Guyanese coat of arms.

== Gallery ==
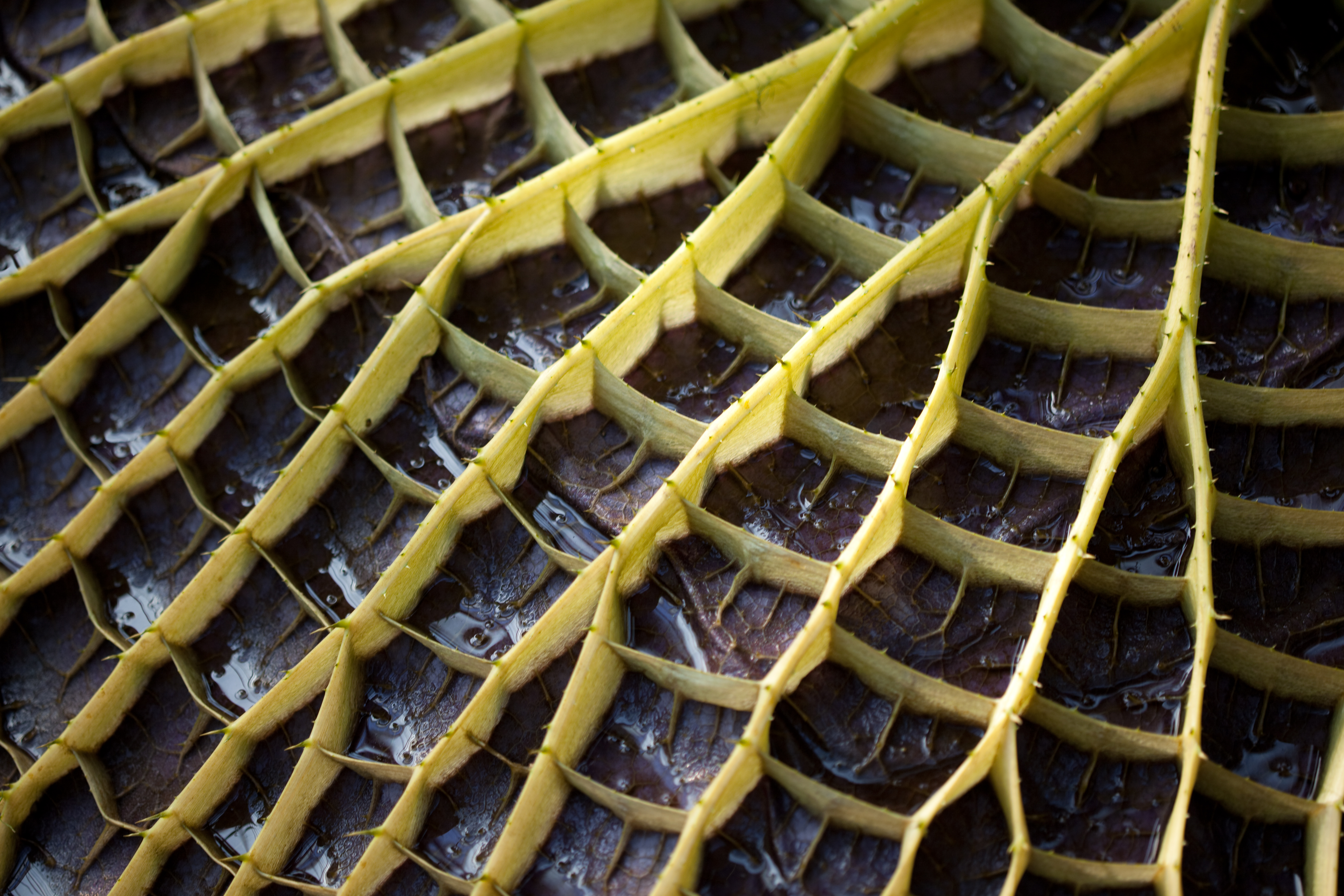
Underside of a leaf

Leaf

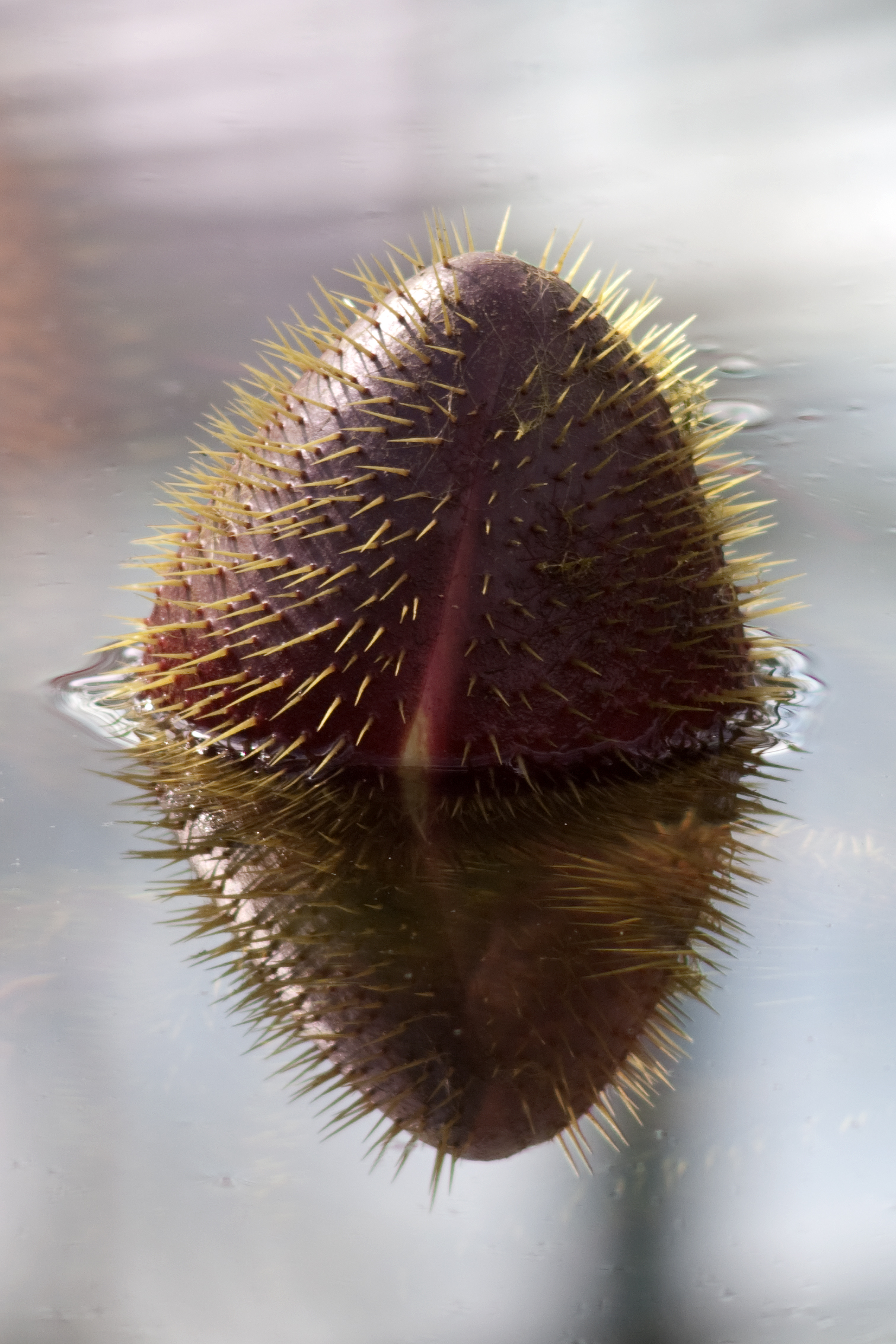
Flower bud, Adelaide Botanic Gardens

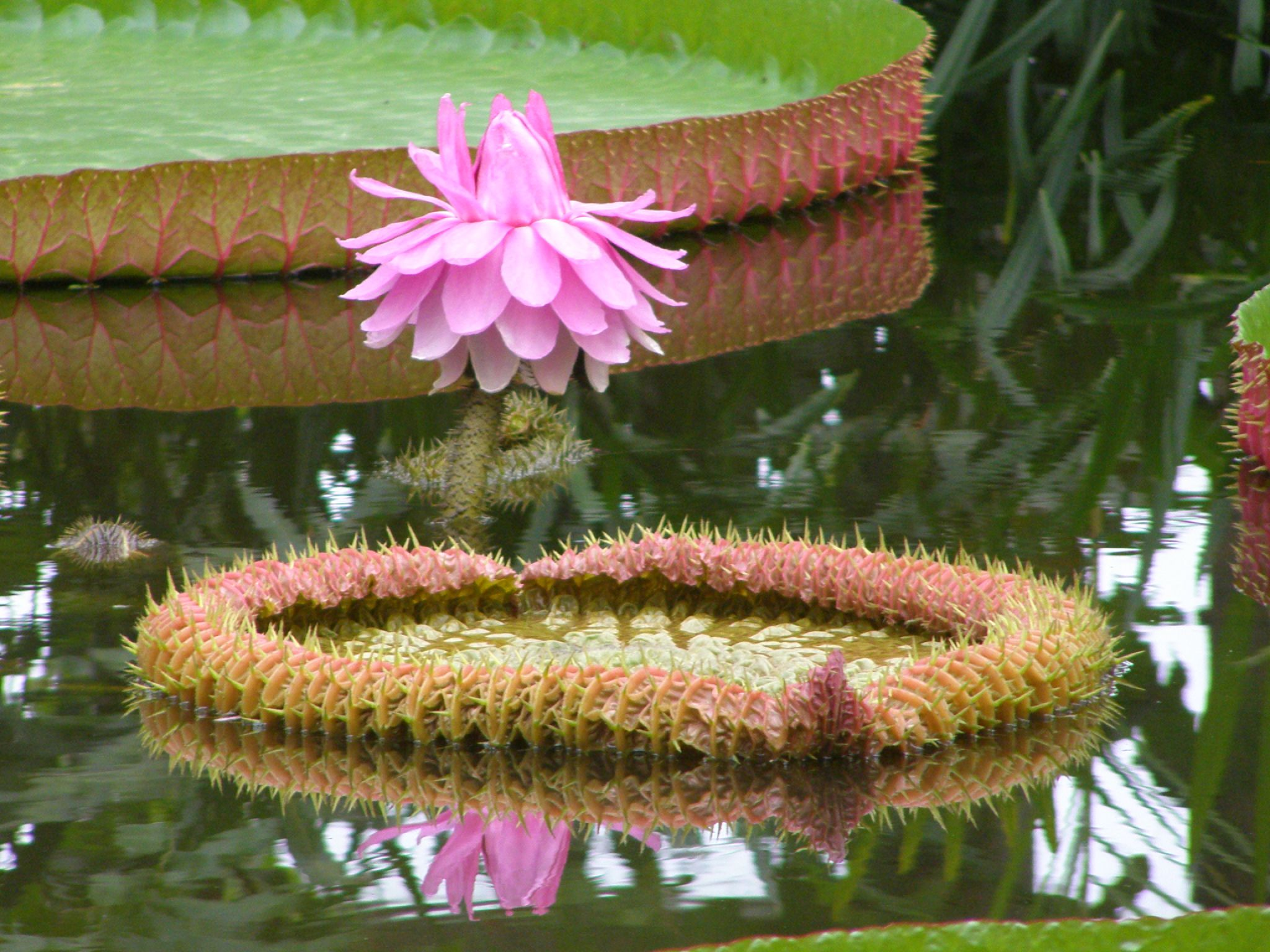
Flower

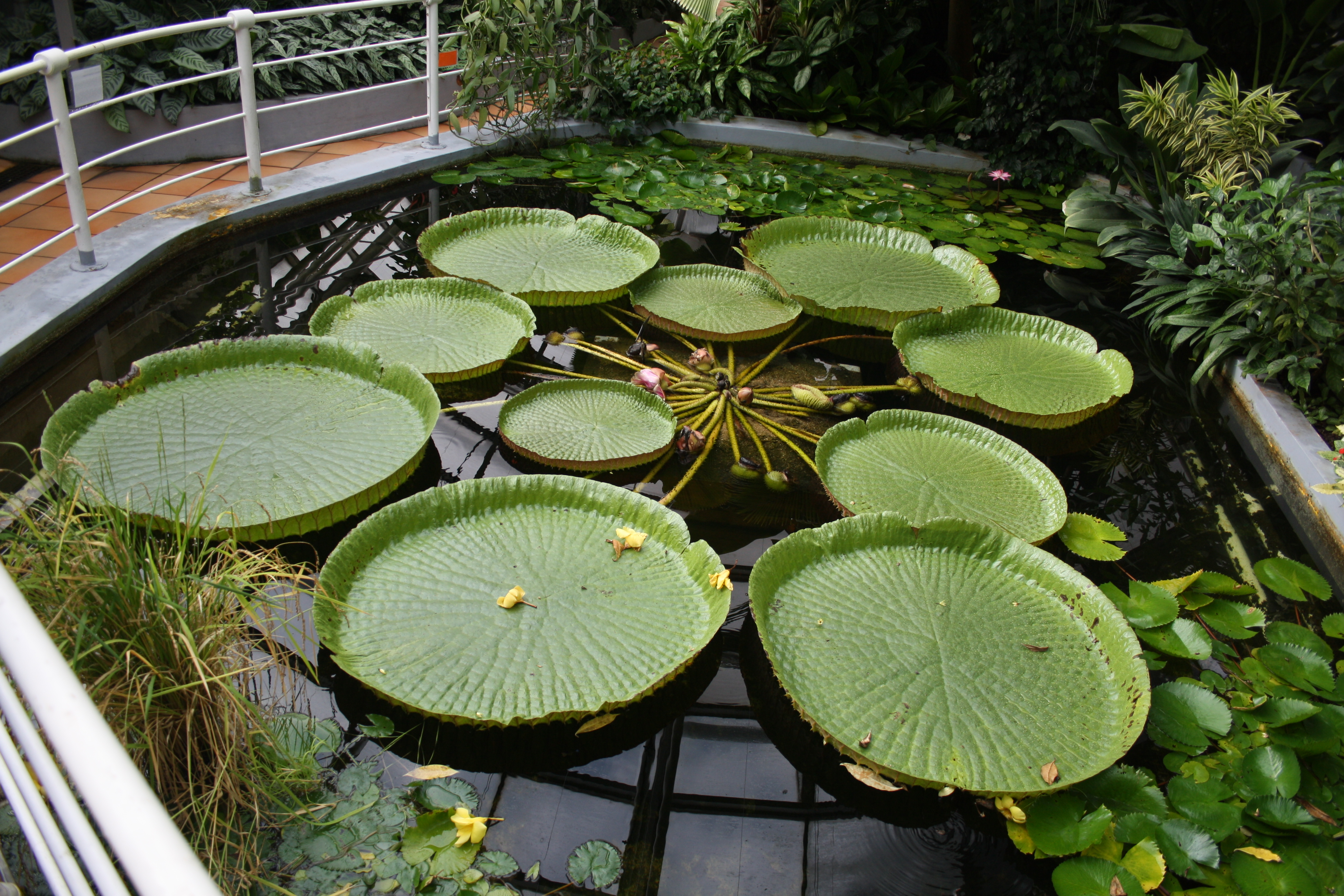
In botanical garden of Brno

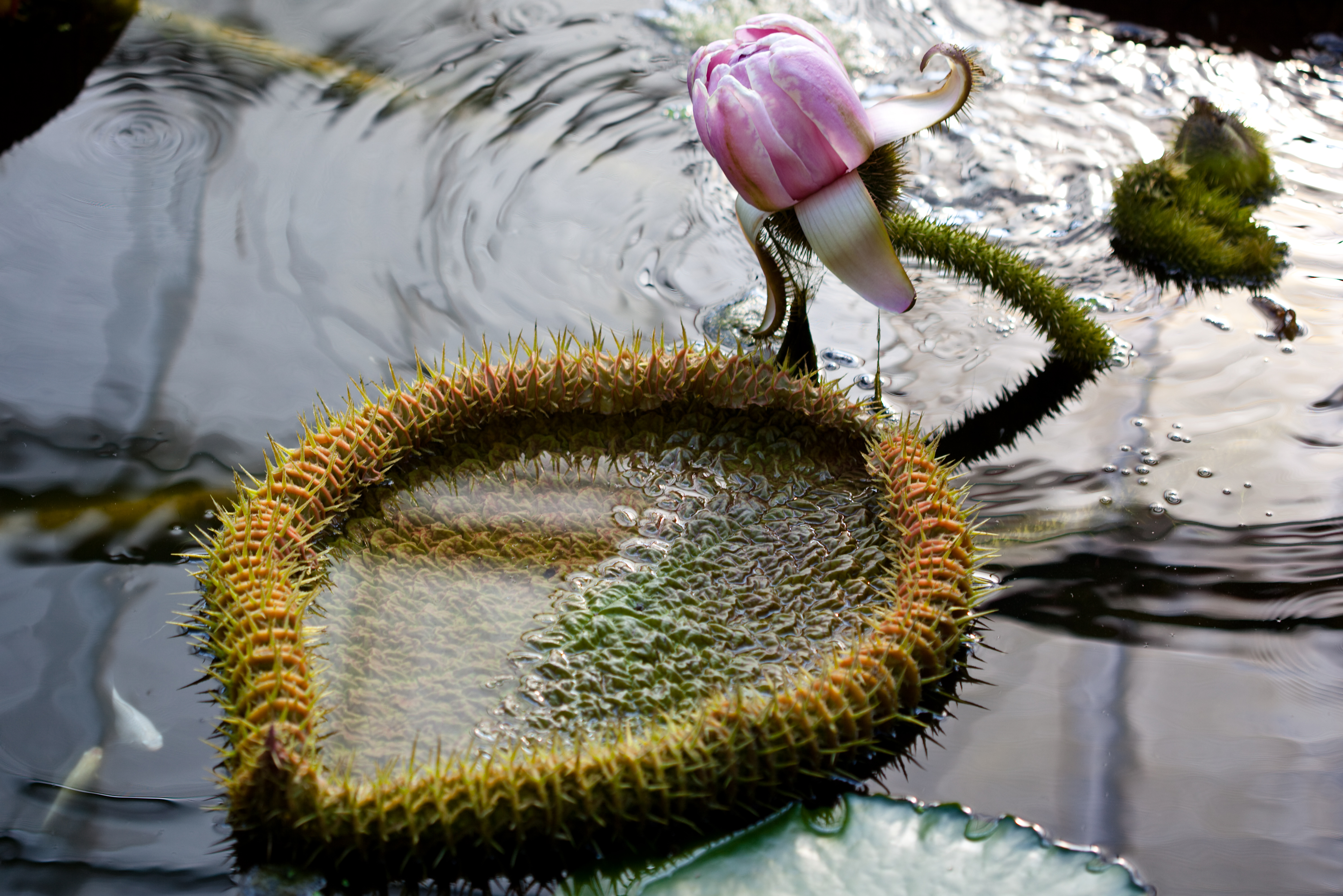
In Kobe Kachoen

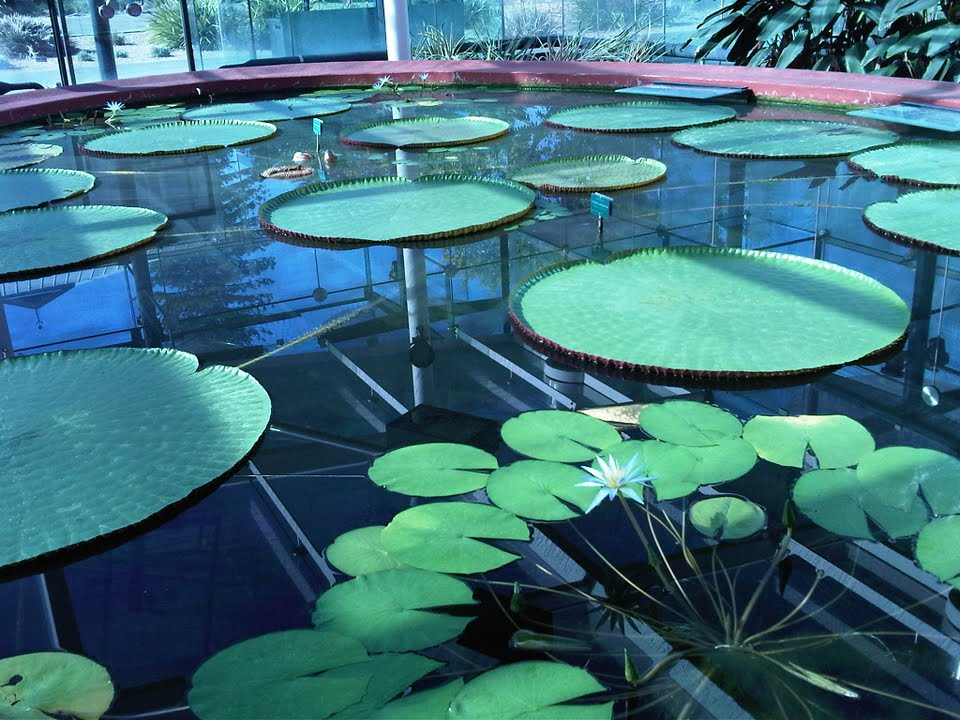
In the Adelaide Botanic Gardens

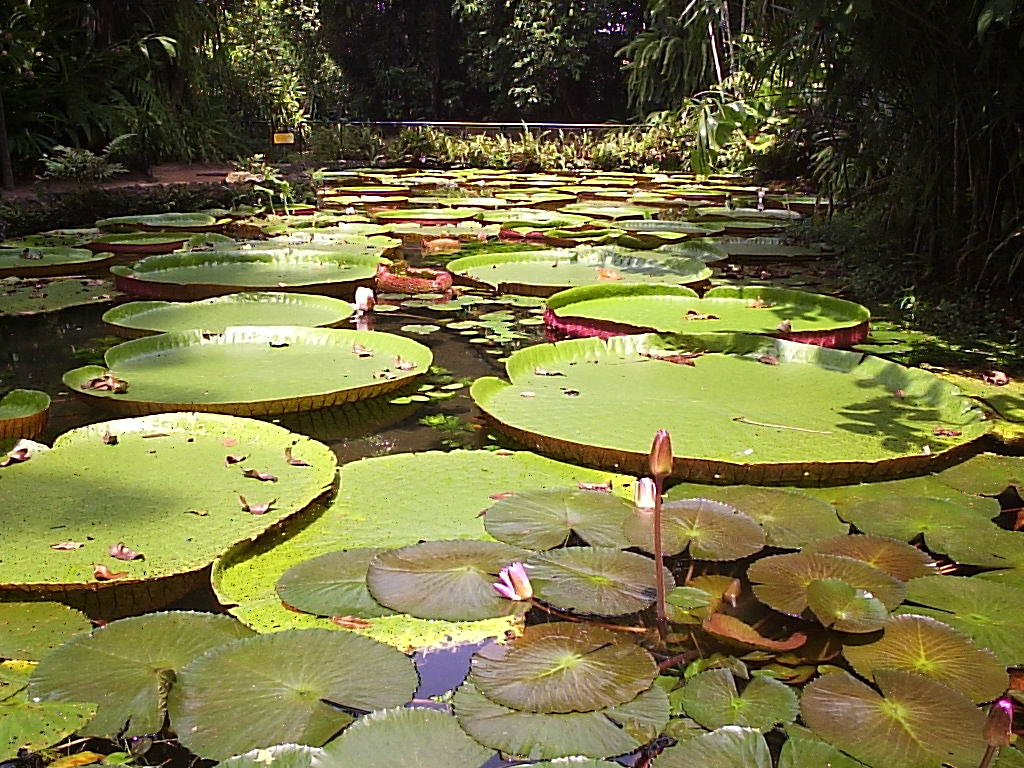
In Paraense Emílio Goeldi Museum

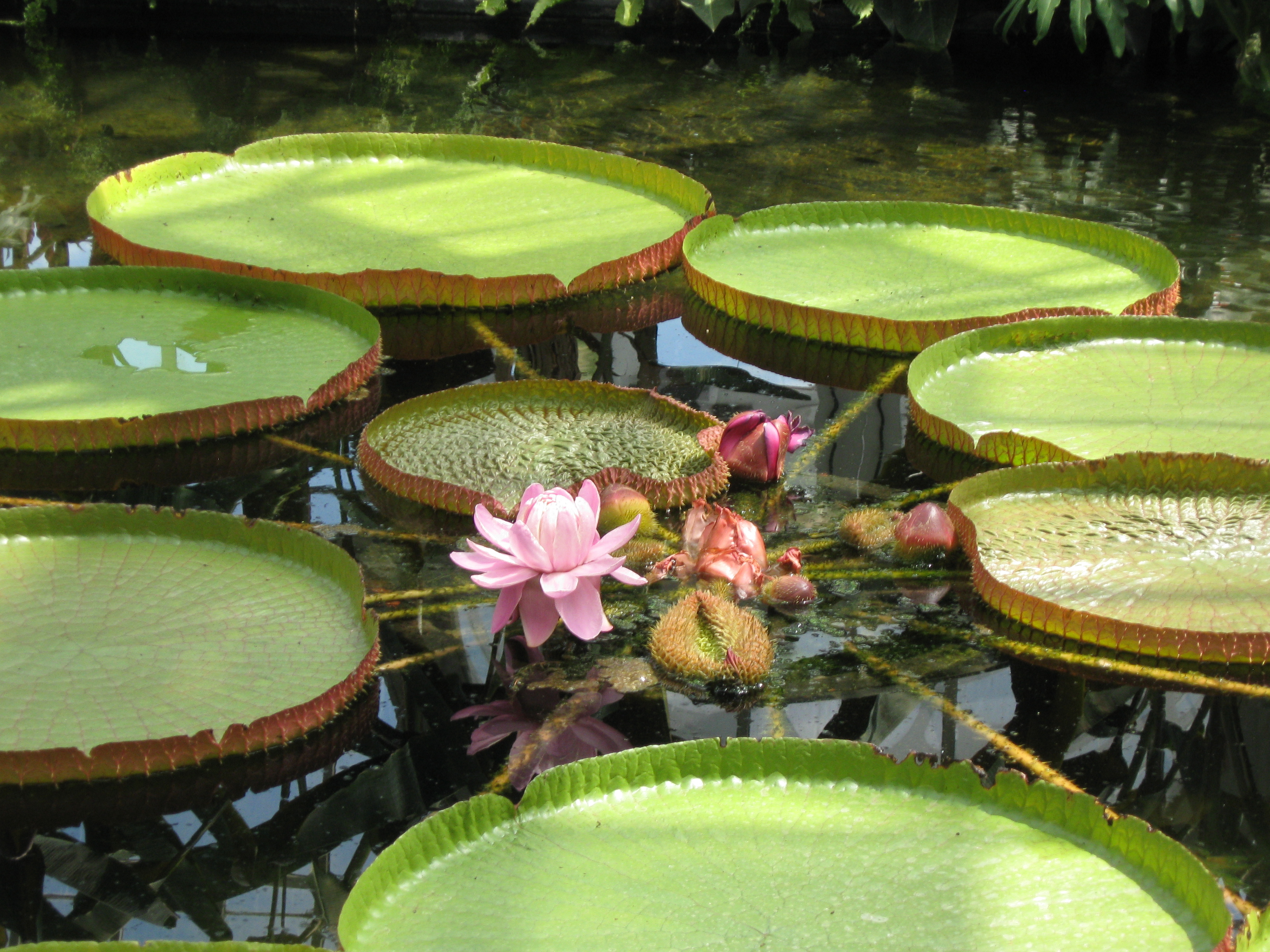
In Phipps Conservatory and Botanical Gardens, Pittsburgh

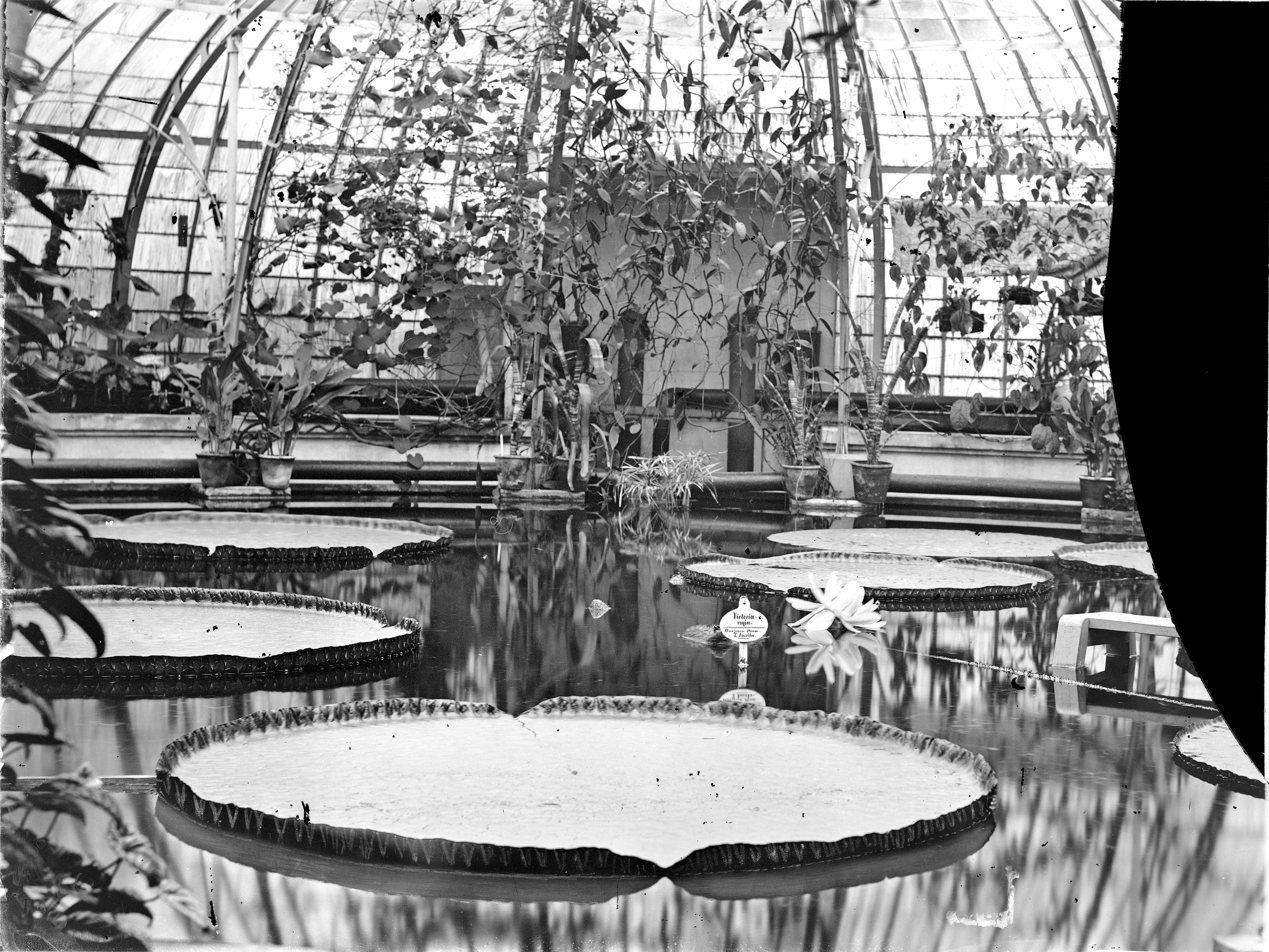
In bloom in the Hortus Botanicus Leiden at the end of the 19th century

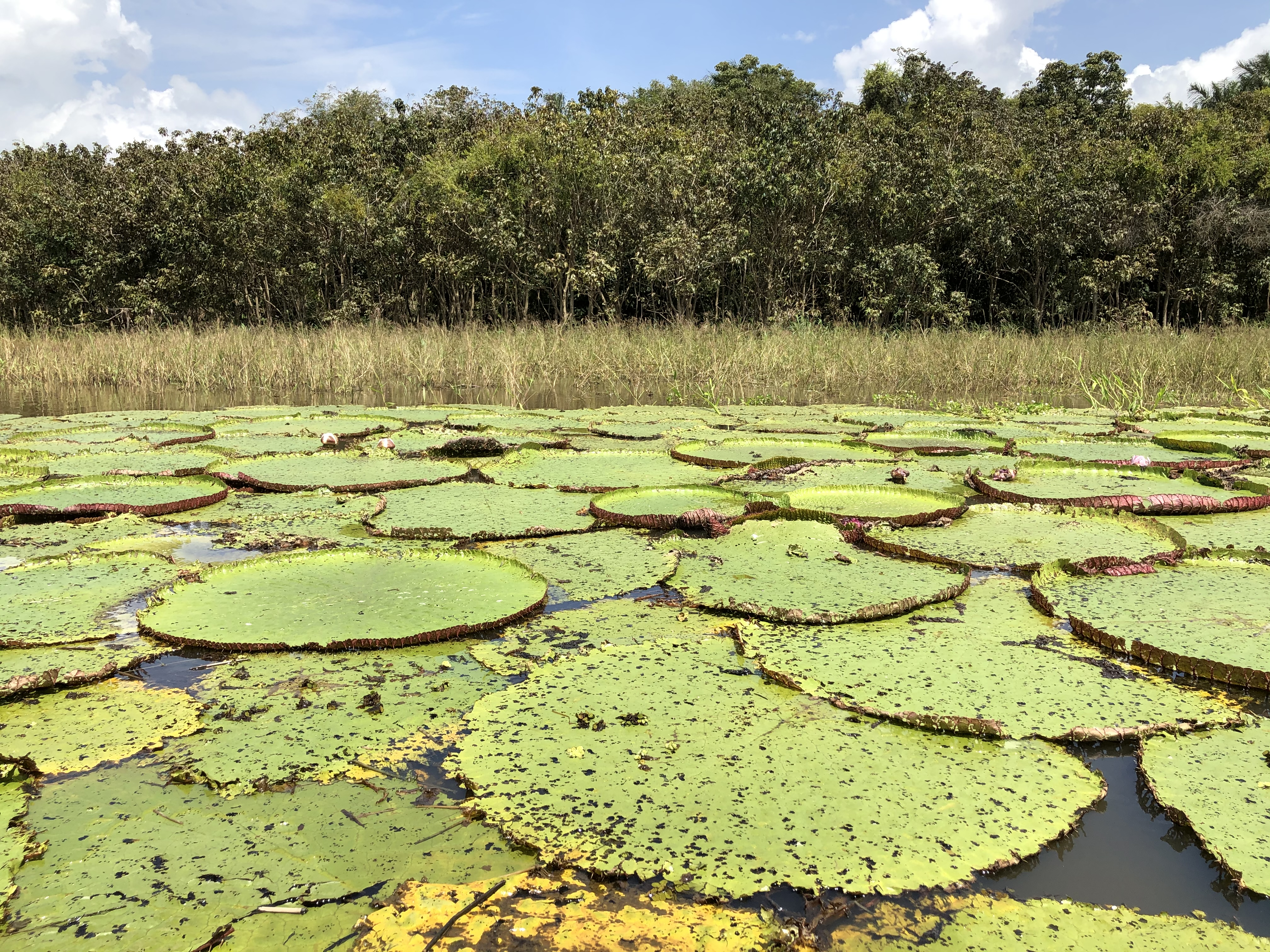
Victoria amazonica in the Amazon basin near Manaus, Brazil

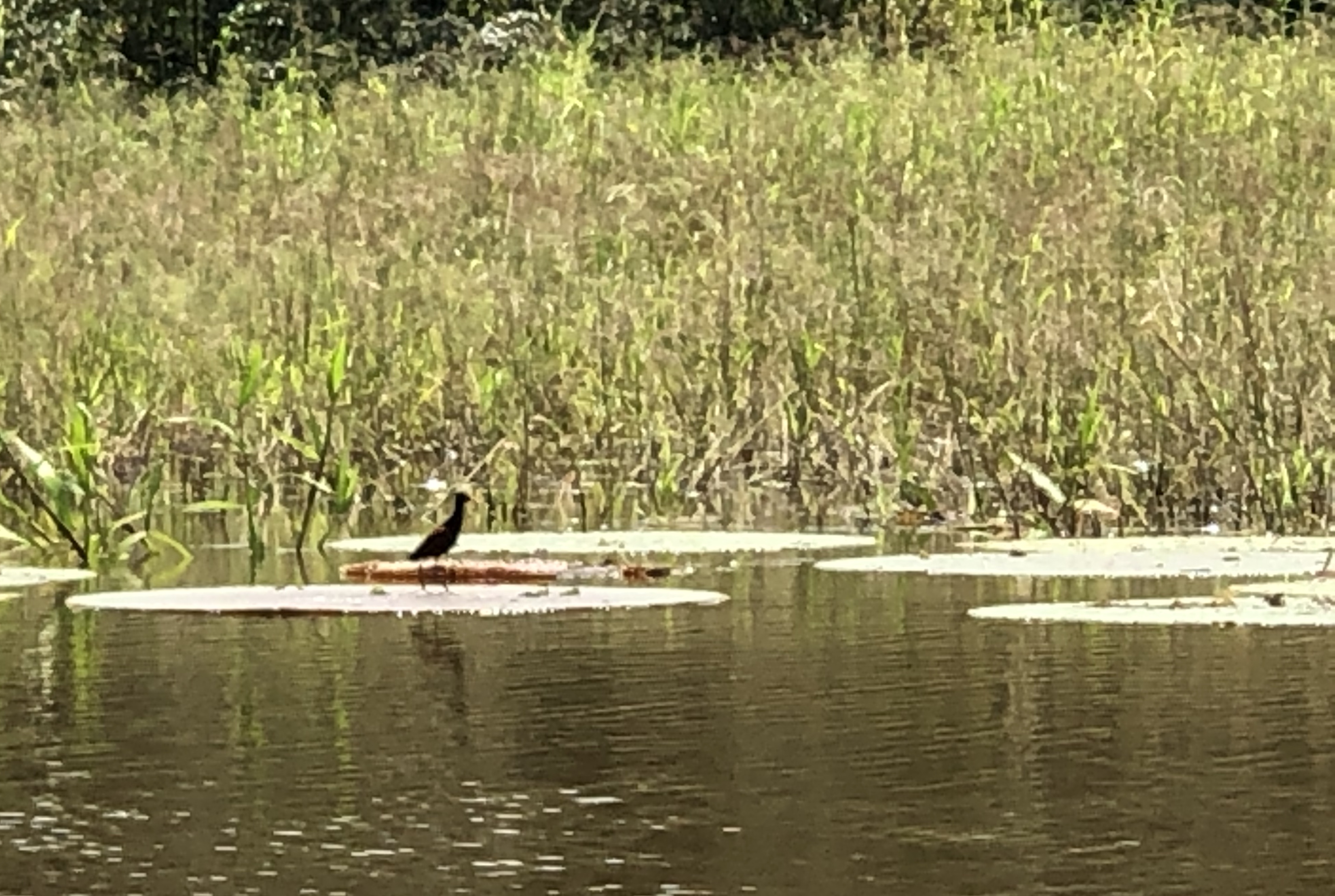
A wattled jacana (Jacana jacana) on V. amazonica near Manaus, Brazil
