= English Botany =

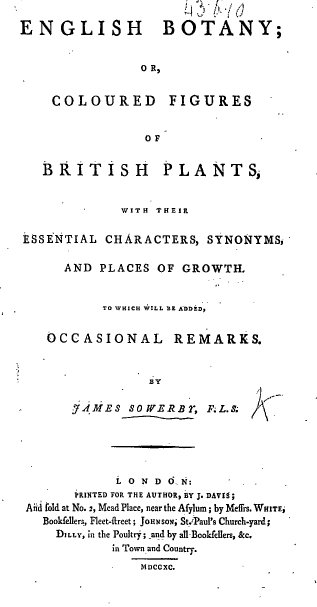
- Title page from the book
- Author: James Sowerby, James Edward Smith & others
- Illustrator: James Sowerby
- Language: English
- Series: 36 Volumes. 1 Full index. 2 supplements
- Subject: Botanical publication
- Publisher: James Sowerby
- Publication date: December 1790 to September 1814. Supplements January 1829 to July 1835.
- Publication place: England
- Media type: Letterpress plus 2,796 hand-coloured, engraved plates.
- Pages: 5,788
- Followed by: 2nd Edition 1831 to 1846

English Botany was a significant botanical publication comprising 36 volumes, issued in 267 monthly parts between 1790 and 1814. Conceived, illustrated, edited, and published by James Sowerby, the work featured technical descriptions primarily provided by Sir James Edward Smith, founder of the Linnean Society. Initially reluctant to associate his name with the project due to Sowerby’s lower social status, Smith later insisted on being credited as the author after its widespread success. Despite this social dynamic, the two maintained a productive collaboration. The publication, commonly known as Sowerby’s Botany, became the most comprehensive illustrated flora of Great Britain at the time, renowned for its detailed hand-coloured engravings and accessible commentary.

The full title reads; English Botany or, Coloured Figures of British Plants, with their Essential Characters, Synonyms and Places of Growth. The complete First Edition comprises 2,592 hand-coloured, finely detailed, copper-plate engravings, including 3 fold-outs, each with a single page of text. The work is comprehensively indexed with each of the 36 volumes having its own specific set. In September 1814, Sowerby published a comprehensive, 42 page, three-part final index comprising; two indexes with Latin nomenclature (systematical and alphabetical) and an index of the common English names. The final indexes were also sold to non-subscribers as a set that included a six-page index to Sowerby's concurrent work "Coloured Figures of English Fungi or Mushrooms" (1797-1809 with five supplements to 1814) - the supplements not having previously been indexed.

Whilst extensive, the work was not initially intended to be comprehensive - Smith would be the first to attempt such a survey with his first two volumes of Flora Britannica. However, by the end of the work, "Sowerby's Botany" had become the most comprehensive, illustrated flora of Great Britain published up to that time. It included the first descriptions and illustrations of many mosses and lichens, a particular passion of both Sowerby and Smith. The very high quality, fully coloured plates accompanied by brief technical descriptions followed by lengthy comments in plain English resulted in the work's immediate popularity with the general public. The aesthetic appeal of the vivid hand coloured engravings earned Sowerby much praise.

In 1814 Sowerby was offering the complete work or individual plates without text as follows:

"ENGLISH BOTANY; or, coloured figures of all the plants native of the Empire of Great Britain, by JAMES SOWERBY; with their essential characters, synonyms, and places of growth, to which are added occasional remarks, &c. by Sir J. E. SMITH, &c. &c. royal octvo. No. 1 to 267, £55 7s.; (Note: Equivalent to £5,421.30 in 2016 (averaged value over the years 1791 to 1814 - Bank of England Figures)) quarto copies of the coloured plates only, may be had at 1s. each plate; also 8vo. copies of the plates only, of any particular class or genus of plants, at 6d each plate."

Even though printed in runs of up to 900 copies, an extraordinarily high number for copper-plate engravings, few complete, first edition sets of the work were actually assembled. This is probably as a result of the high total selling price and a very lengthy period of publication that spanned two major wars and the famine of 1805. Complete first edition sets are now a great rarity, with only four being known for certain to have survived, all of which are in private ownership. The plates of the first edition are of exceptionally high quality with extremely fine detail that requires a scanning resolution of at least 1,200ppi to be reproduced adequately. There are numerous extant part-sets, usually comprising little more than the first half to two-thirds of the work. None of the quarto, coloured plates is known to have survived.

Sowerby's son, James de Carle Sowerby published two supplements to the original work. The first Supplement, issued from July 1829 to April 1831, comprised 100 new plates numbered 2593 - 2692 together with associated texts. The Second Supplement, issued from June 1831 to January 1835, comprised 104 additional plates destined for the Second Edition, numbered 2693 - 2796 including two fold-out illustrations. Some of these were engraved by James McNab. The Supplements were available either coloured or plain but most were sold plain and have long since been lost. None of the copper plates was scrapped enabling the printing of a subsequent edition.

The Second Edition, initially titled, "The New Edition", comprised 2,580 consecutively re-numbered impressions from the First Edition and it's Supplements plus a further 168 plates within supplements to volumes 1 to 7 some of which were entirely new and erratically numbered from 2800 (May 1837) to 2866 (November 1841). This edition was published progressively from 1832 to 1846 to form a 12 volume set with greatly reduced and revised yet more concise texts. This edition was "Arranged according to the Linnaean method" by Charles Johnson, botany lecturer at Guy's Hospital. The hand coloured, copper plate engravings were printed on high quality paper, facing blank opposites resulting in none of the text off-setting that is the bane of many first edition plates. It is also apparent that a new, non-bleeding, acid-free black ink was used for the impressions, resulting in improved print clarity. The plates were not as comprehensively coloured as in the first edition but the colouring was of better quality, especially of the mosses and lichens. Minor reworking of some of the very fine details is evident. It is not known how many second edition copies were printed, but the extreme rarity of surviving sets (only one known as at July 2021) indicates that it was a very low number.

A shorter edition started in 1863 saw editor John Boswell alter the texts for the second time and include a "popular portion". However, it is evident that by this time the original copper plates had started to deteriorate to such a degree that many were copied whilst others suffered low-grade, clumsy repair work. They mostly suffered from the frequent addition of crudely drafted, un-coloured outlines of the leaves that further reduced the quality and aesthetics of the earlier editions. Plates from this edition usually include the initials "E.B." followed by the relevant First Edition plate number, or "E.B.S." referring to the second edition plate number.

Later, editions of the book were to take advantage of mechanical colour printing, improving the affordability of the book but at the cost of image quality. None of these later, low grade editions appear to have survived to the present day.

== Example Plates ==
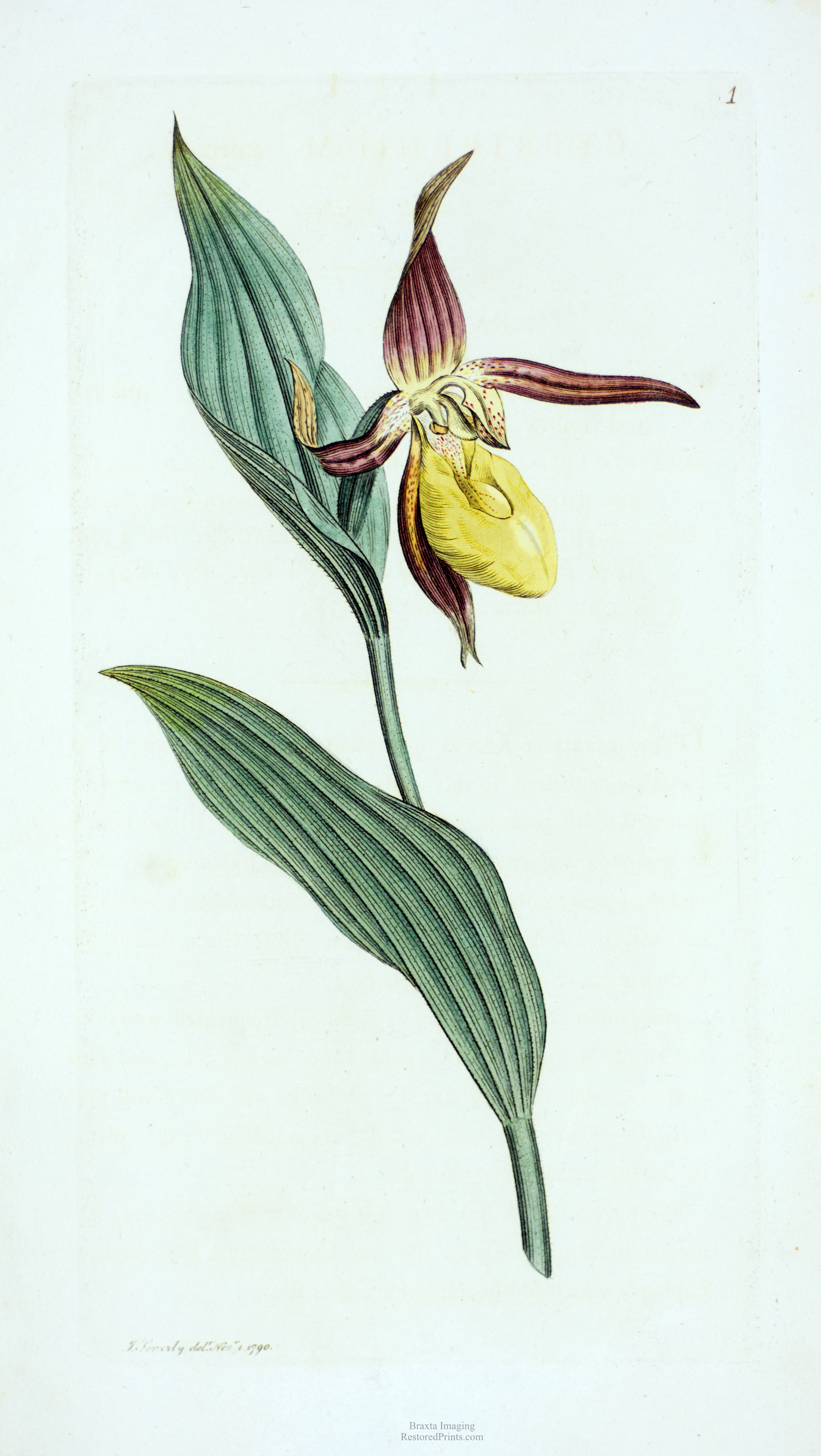
Plate 1, Volume 1 - Lady's Slipper Orchid (Cypripedium calceolus)

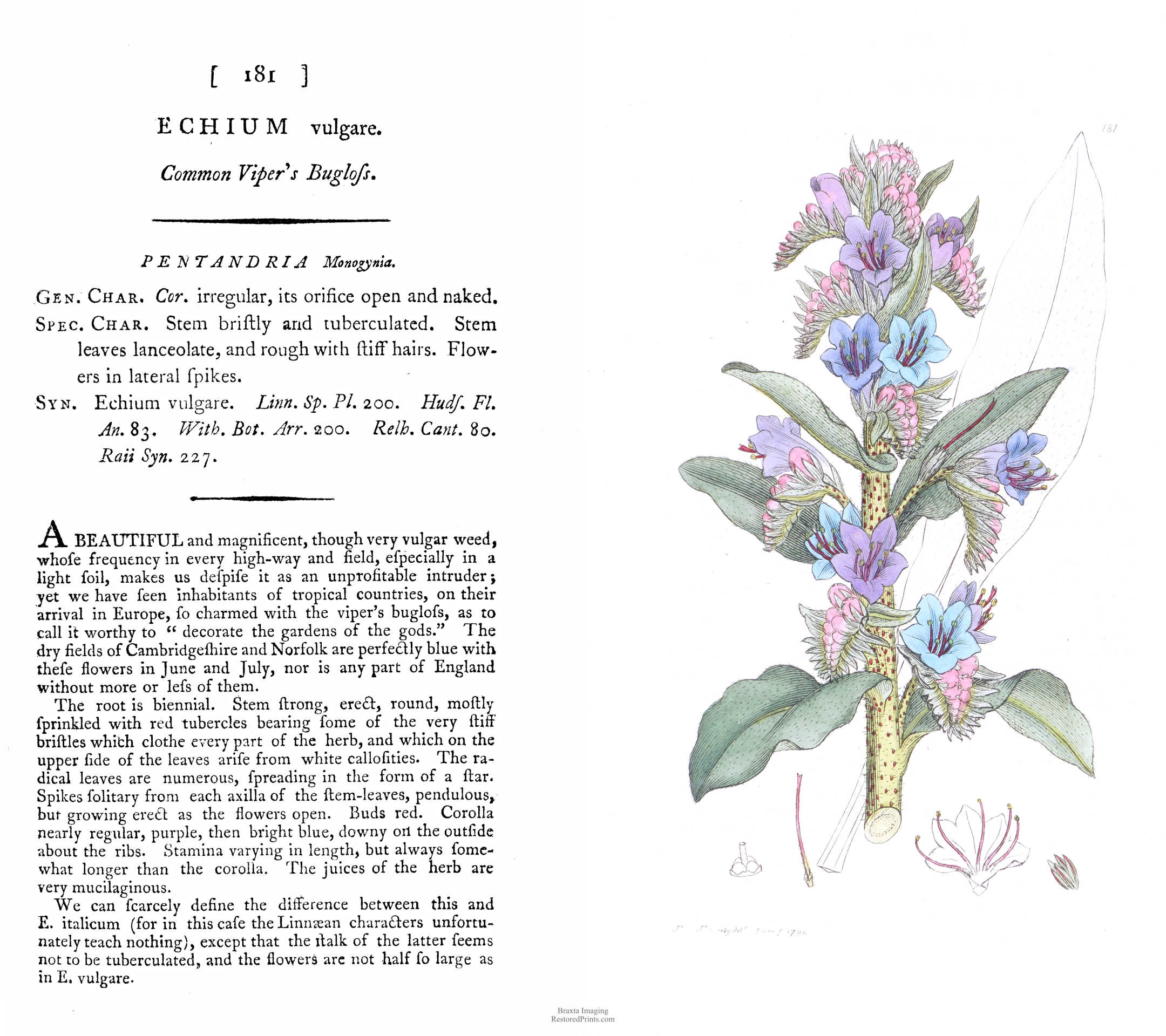
Plate 181 with text - Common Viper's Bugloss

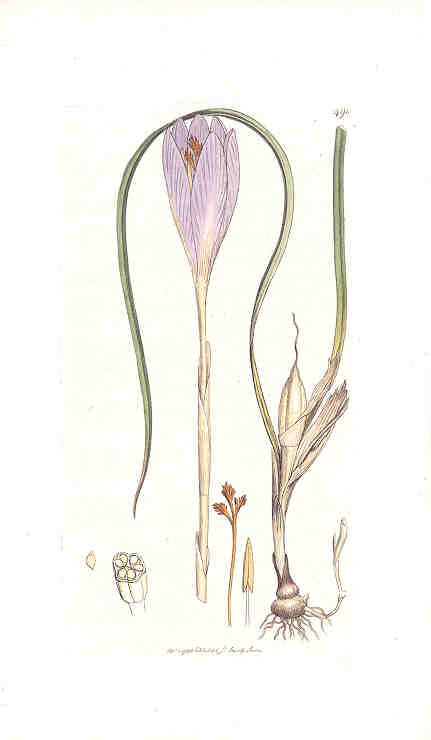
Hand coloured plate Crocus nudfloris by James Sowerby

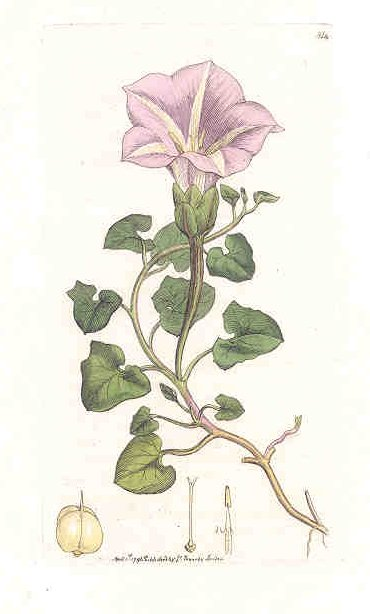
Hand coloured plate of Convolvulus soldanella (see Convolvulus), Sea Bindweed

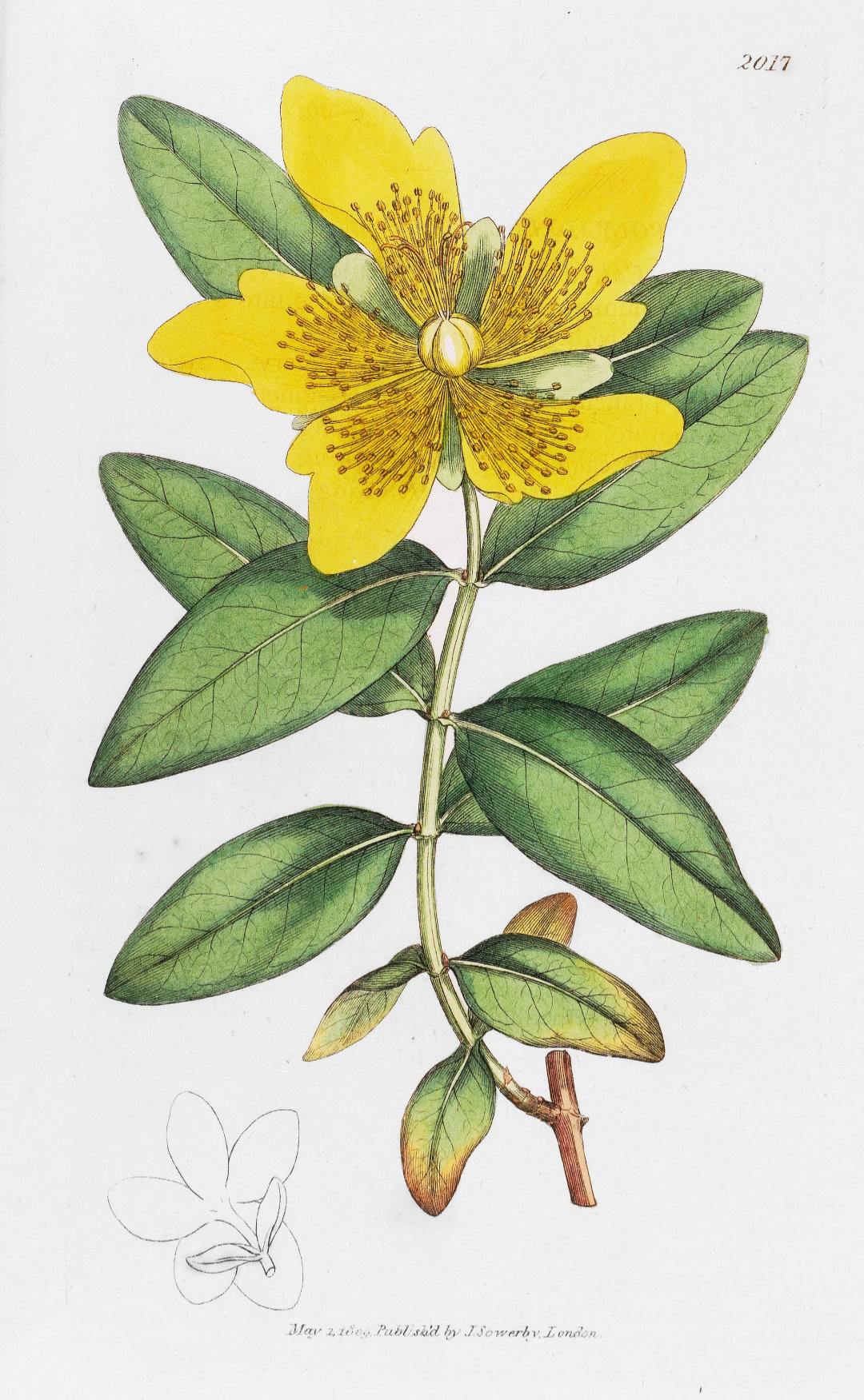
Long-flowered St.Johns-wort. Plate 2017. Vol 29 (1st. Ed. 1807)

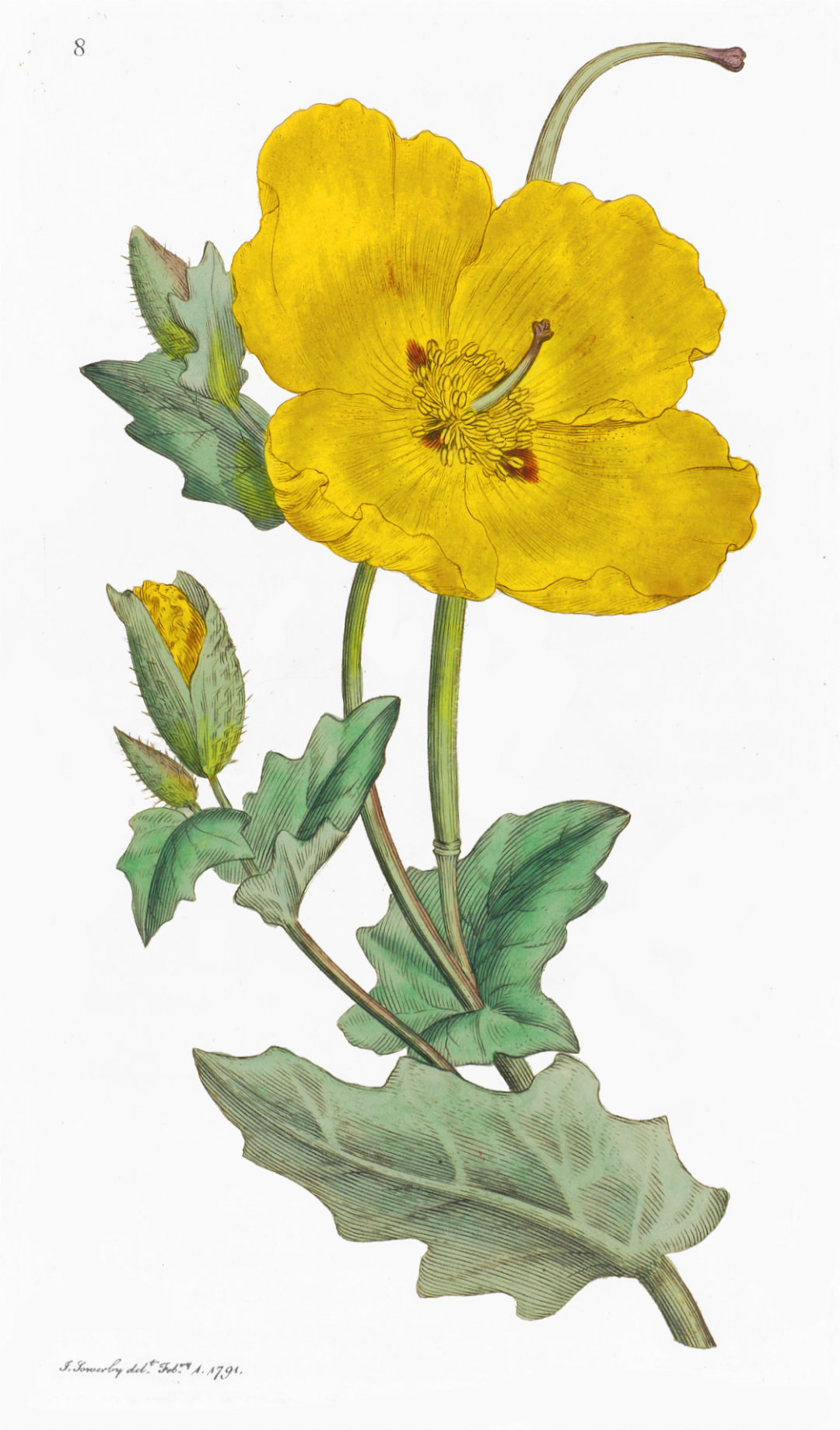
Yellow-horned Poppy. Plate 8. Vol 1 (1st. Ed. 1791)

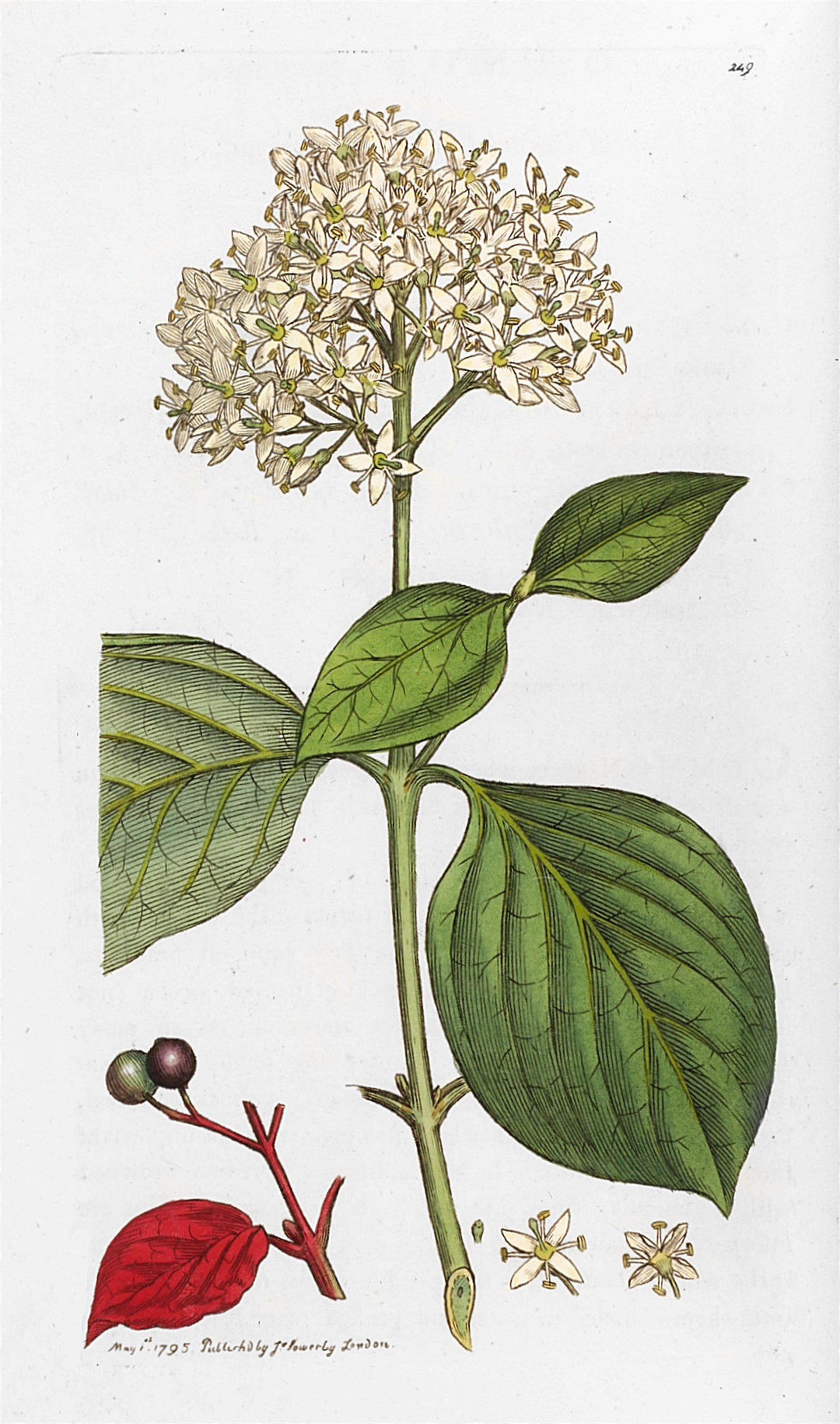
Dogwood or Wild Cornel-tree. Plate 249. Vol 4 (1st. Ed. 1795)

== Bibliography ==
- Sowerby, James (1804). English Botany; Or, Coloured Figures of British Plants, with Their Essential characters, synonyms, and places of growth. To which will be added, occasional remarks. London: Robert Hardwicke.
- Walsh, Huber M. (2003). "James Sowerby". Rare book - Authors. Missouri Botanical Garden. "Unlike other flower painters of the time, whose work tended toward pleasing wealthy patrons, he worked directly with scientists."
- Robert Erickson. "Smith, James Edward". Authors. Botanicus.
- "Sir J.E. Smith (1759-1828)". Home > History > Sir J. E. Smith. Linnean Society of London. "In 1790, Smith started on his first major work, English Botany, which brought him the acquaintance of leading botanists."
- Exhibition curator: Hugh Cahill (2006-05-10). "The British flora described". NATURE OBSERVED: THE WORK OF THE BOTANICAL ARTIST: An exhibition of books from the Foyle Special Collections Library. King's College London. pp. Case 4. Archived from the original on 2009-06-01. "However, it did not describe the fungi of Britain and so Sowerby published Coloured figures of English fungi (1797-1815) to accompany it, for which he provided both the text and the plates."
