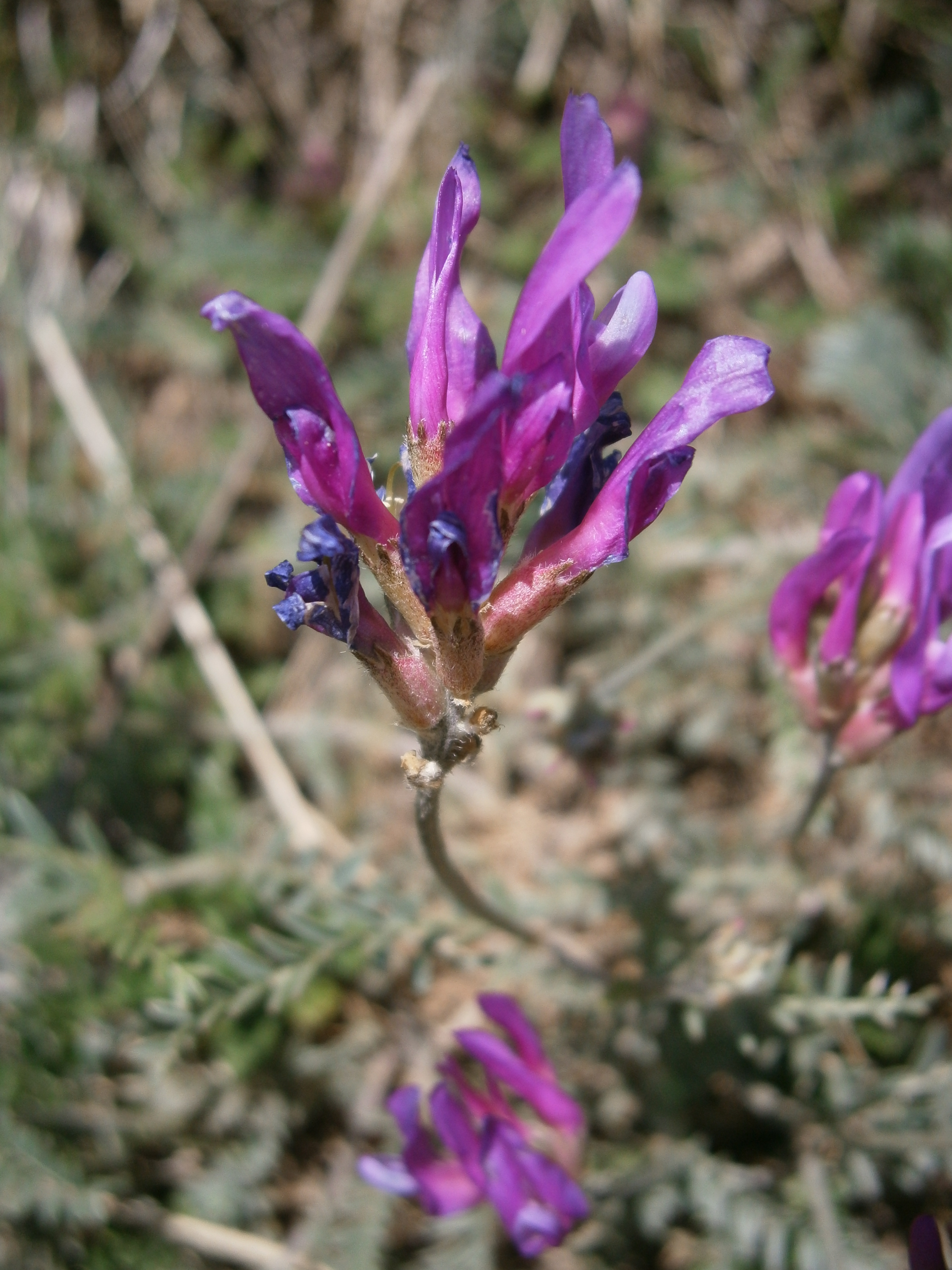
- Inflorescence
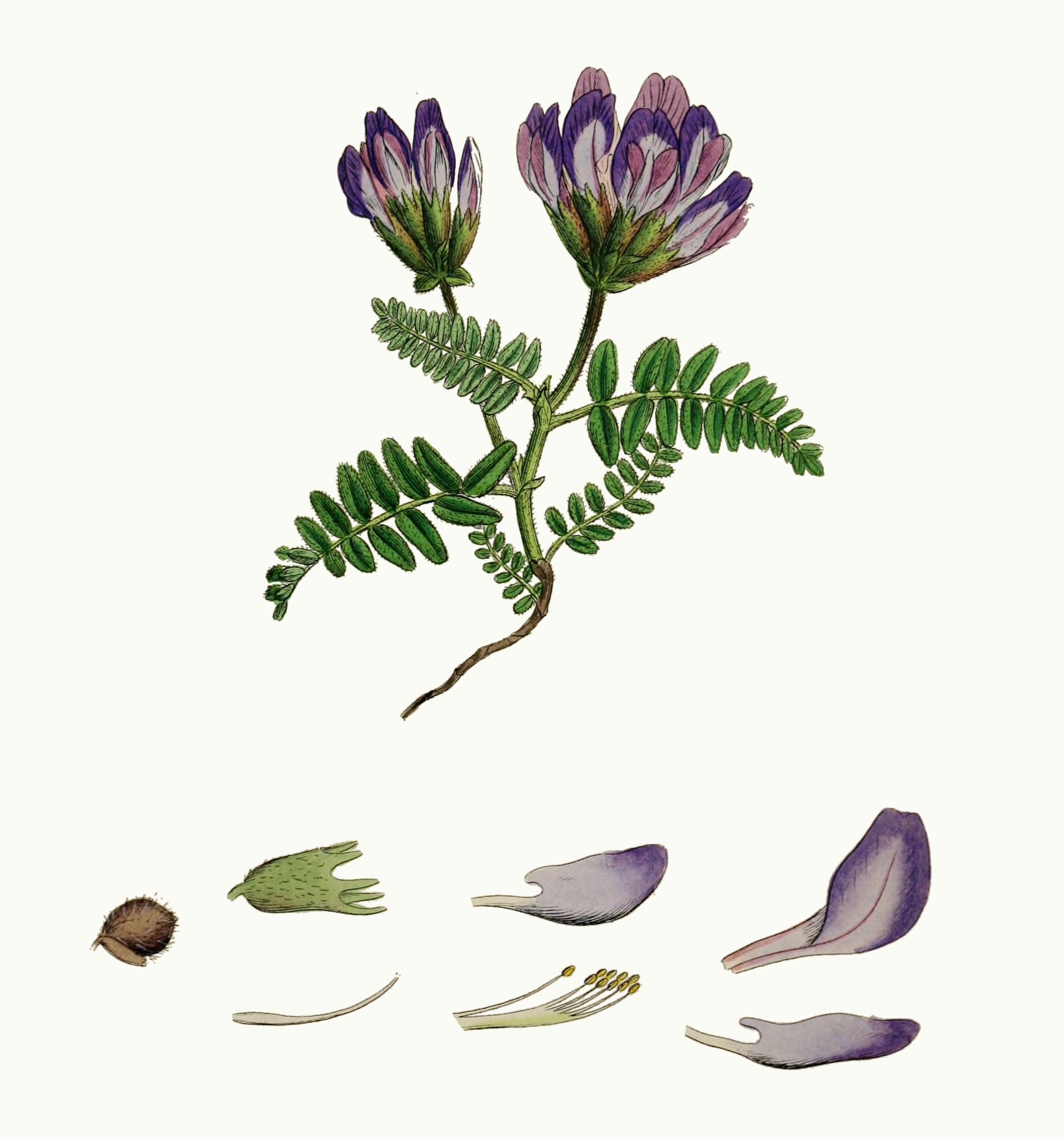
- Botanical illustration from English Botany

Scientific classification
- Kingdom: Plantae
- Clade: Tracheophytes
- Clade: Angiosperms
- Clade: Eudicots
- Clade: Rosids
- Order: Fabales
- Family: Fabaceae
- Subfamily: Faboideae
- Genus: Astragalus
- Species: A. hypoglottis

Binomial name
- Astragalus hypoglottis L.

Synonyms
- List: Astragalus agrestis Douglas ex Hook.; Astragalus clusii Pollini; Astragalus dasyglottis var. hypoglottis (L.) Pall.; Astragalus gremlii Burnat; Astragalus hippoglossus St.-Lag.; Astragalus hypoglottis var. gremlii (Burnat) Bolzon; Astragalus hypoglottis var. purpureus (Lam.) Fiori; Astragalus hypoglottis subsp. purpureus (Lam.) Rivas Goday & Borja; Astragalus onobrychis subsp. hypoglottis (L.) Bonnier & Layens; Astragalus onobrychis subsp. purpureus (Lam.) Bonnier & Layens; Astragalus onobrychis subsp. purpureus Bonnier; Astragalus pulchellus Salisb.; Astragalus purpureus Lam.; Astragalus purpureus subsp. gremlii (Burnat) Asch. & Graebn.; Astragalus purpureus proles gremlii (Burnat) Rouy; Hypoglottis purpurea Fourr.; Oxytropis montana Spreng.; Phaca hypoglottis (L.) MacMill.; Solenotus hypoglottis (L.) Steven; Tragacantha hypoglottis (L.) Kuntze; Tragacantha purpurea (Lam.) Kuntze

= Astragalus hypoglottis =

Species of plant

Astragalus hypoglottis, the purple milkvetch or tongue-under-tongue, is a species of flowering plant in the family Fabaceae. It is native to Spain, France, Italy, Austria, the former Yugoslavia, and Albania. A decumbent perennial with stems reaching 8 in (20 cm), it is typically found in dry, alkaline soils.

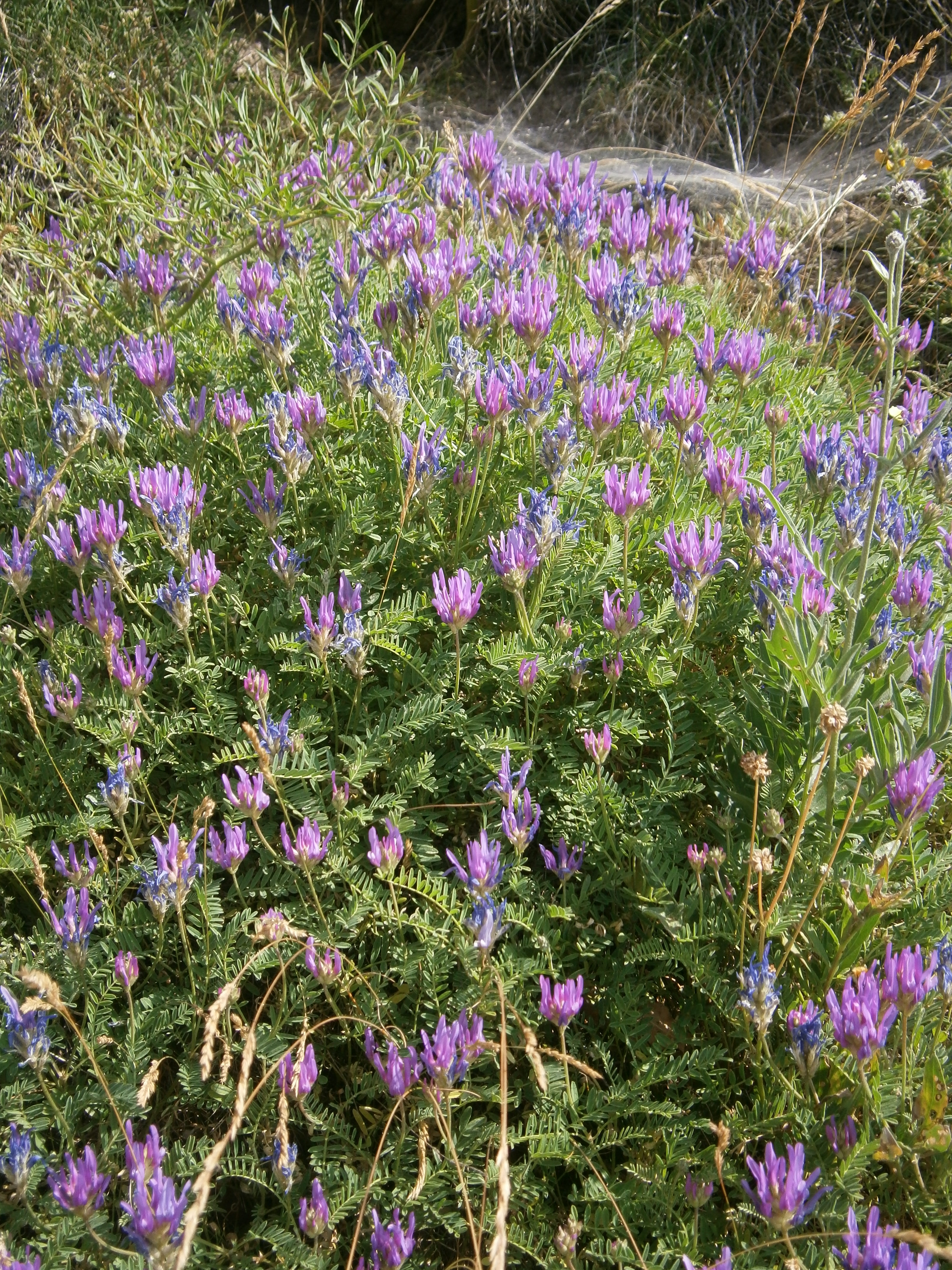
Wider view

== Subtaxa ==
The following subspecies are accepted:

- Astragalus hypoglottis subsp. gremlii (Burnat) Greuter & Burdet – eastern France, Italy, Austria, former Yugoslavia, Albania
- Astragalus hypoglottis subsp. hypoglottis – Spain, southern France
