= Sowerbyella radiculata =

Scientific classification
- Kingdom: Fungi
- Division: Ascomycota
- Class: Pezizomycetes
- Order: Pezizales
- Family: Pyronemataceae
- Genus: Sowerbyella
- Species: S. radiculata

Binomial name
- Sowerbyella radiculata Sowerby, 1797

Species of fungus

Sowerbyella radiculata is a species of apothecial fungus belonging to the family Pyronemataceae. The typical form appears as yellowish cups up to 5 cm (2.0 in) in diameter usually on soil close to coniferous trees. A distinctive form, var. kewensis, is usually larger (up to 10 cm (3.9 in) across) and often associated with broad-leaved trees. This is an uncommon European species.
