= Mototeru Kamo =

Japanese horticulturist (born 1930)

Mototeru Kamo (加茂 元照, Kamo Mototeru; born 1930 in Kakegawa, Shizuoka) is a Japanese horticulturist.

He is known for creating and maintaining a number of bird and flower theme parks in Japan, including the following.

- Fuji Kachoen (1990)
- Matsue Vogel (2001)
- Kamo Iris Garden (2003) in Kakegawa, Shizuoka
- Kobe Kachoen (2003) in Kobe

He is creator of Kimjongilia, a Begonia hybrid flower, dedicated to North Korean leader Kim Jong Il.
