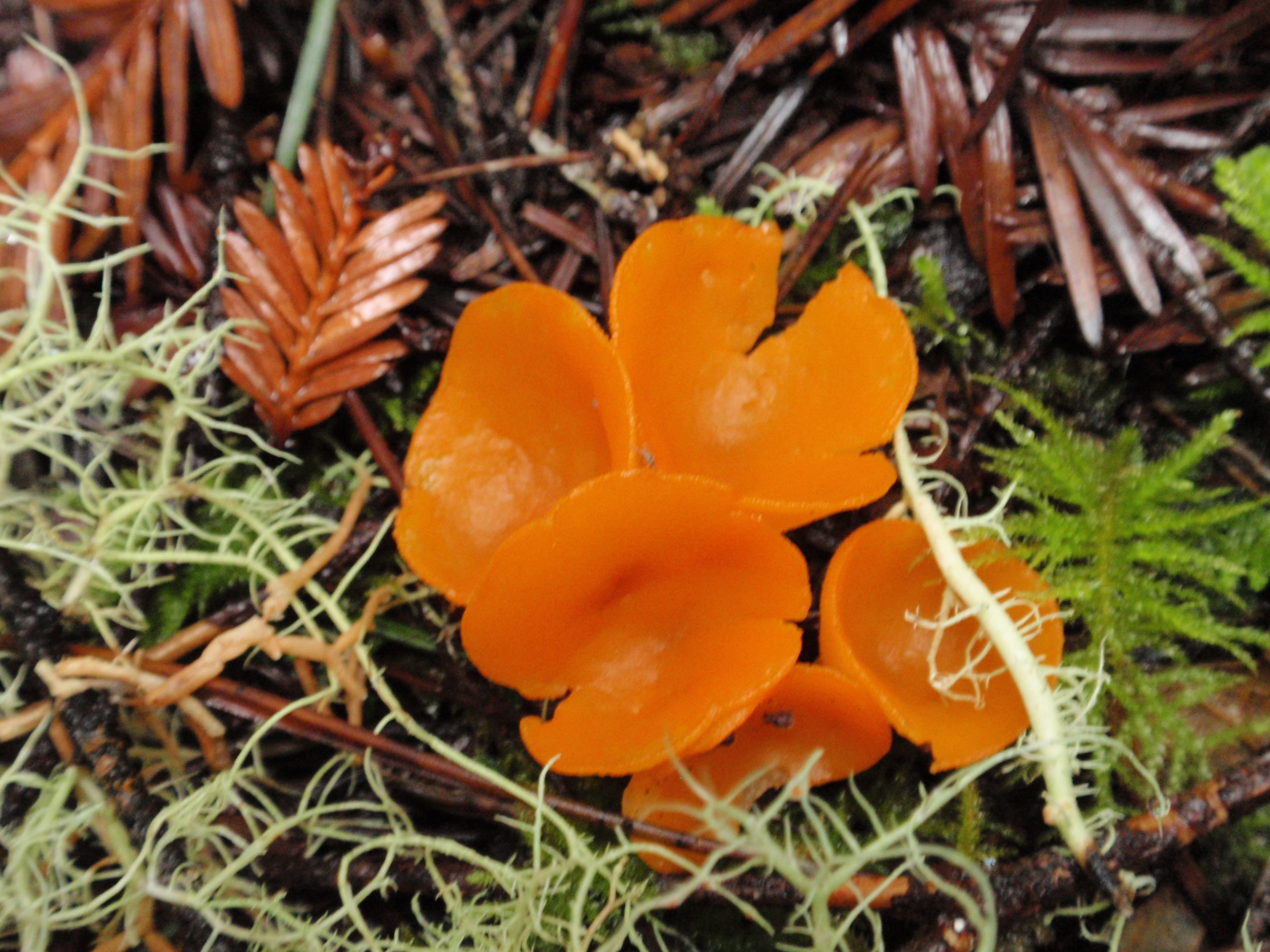
- Sowerbyella rhenana

Scientific classification
- Kingdom: Fungi
- Division: Ascomycota
- Class: Pezizomycetes
- Order: Pezizales
- Family: Pyronemataceae
- Genus: Sowerbyella; Nannf.

Type species
- Sowerbyella radiculata (Sowerby) Nannf.

Species
- See text

= Sowerbyella =

Genus of fungi

Sowerbyella is a genus of fungi in the family Pyronemataceae. The genus has a widespread distribution, and contains 17 species found mostly in Europe and China.

The genus was circumscribed by John Axel Nannfeldt in Svensk Bot. Tidskr. vol.32 on page 118 in 1938.

The genus name of Sowerbyella is in honour of James Sowerby (1757–1822), who was an English naturalist, illustrator and mineralogist.

== Species ==
As accepted by Species Fungorum;

- Sowerbyella angustispora J.Z. Cao & J. Moravec (1988)
- Sowerbyella bauerana (Cooke) Harmaja (1984)
- Sowerbyella brevispora Harmaja (1984)
- Sowerbyella crassisculpturata J. Moravec (1985)
- Sowerbyella densireticulata J. Moravec (1985)
- Sowerbyella fagicola J. Moravec (1973)
- Sowerbyella imperialis (Peck) Korf (1971)
- Sowerbyella laevispora W.Y. Zhuang (2009)
- Sowerbyella parvispora (Trigaux) J. Moravec (1986)
- Sowerbyella phlyctispora (Lepr. & Mont.) Hohmeyer & J. Moravec (1995)
- Sowerbyella polaripustulata J. Moravec (1985)
- Sowerbyella radiculata (Sowerby) Nannf. (1938)
- Sowerbyella requisii (Quél.) J. Moravec (1985)
- Sowerbyella rhenana (Fuckel) J. Moravec (1986)
- Sowerbyella unicisa (Peck) J. Moravec (1995)
- Sowerbyella unicolor (Gillet) Nannf. (1938)

Former species;

- S. kaushalii J. Moravec (1986) = Otidea kaushalii, Otideaceae family
- S. pallida (Spooner) J. Moravec (1985) = Svrcekomyces pallidus, Pseudombrophilaceae family
- S. radiculata var. kewensis Y.J. Yao & Spooner (2006) = Sowerbyella radiculata
- S. radiculata var. petaloidea (Cooke & W. Phillips) Y.J. Yao & Spooner (2006) = Sowerbyella radiculata
- S. reguisii var. venustula (Rifai) Häffner (1993) = Sowerbyella reguisii
