= Science-Gossip =

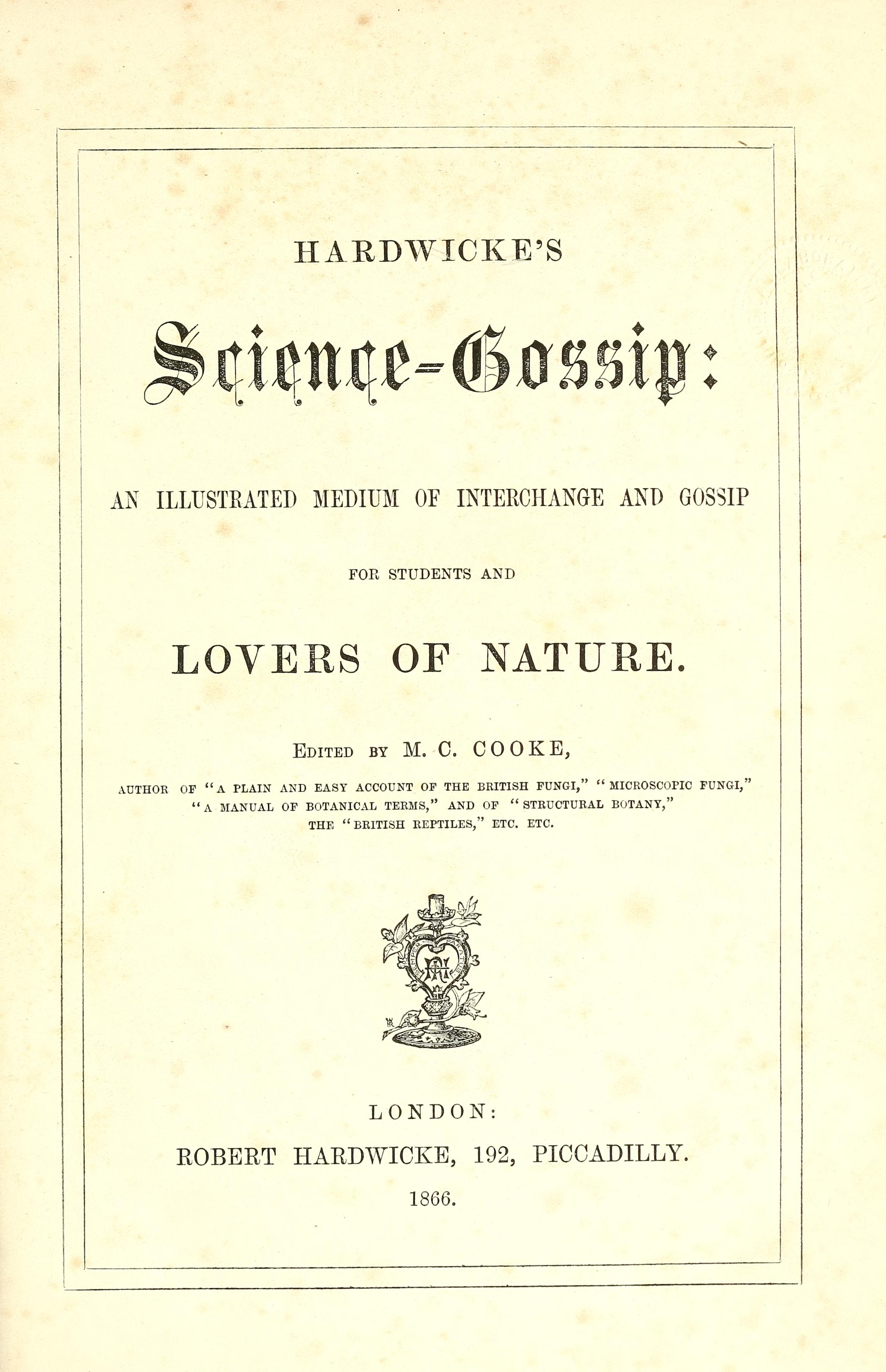
- Front page of vol. 1 of Hardwicke's Science-Gossip
- Discipline: Interdisciplinary
- Language: English

Publication details
- History: First series: 1865 to 1893; Second series: 1894 to 1902
- Publisher: Robert Hardwicke (1st series); Simpking Marshall, Hamilton, Kent & Co., Ltd / R. Friedländer & Sohn. (2nd series) (UK / Germany)

Standard abbreviations
- ISO 4: Sci.-Gossip

Science-Gossip was the common name for two series of monthly popular-science magazines, that were published from 1865 to 1893 and from 1894 to 1902. The first series was called Hardwicke's Science-Gossip, and the second series Science-Gossip.

== Bibliographic information ==
- 1865-1893: Hardwicke's Science-Gossip: An Illustrated Medium of Interchange and Gossip for Students and Lovers of Nature. Edited by M.C. Cooke & J.E. Taylor. London: Robert Hardwicke.

succeeded by:

- 1894-1902: Science-Gossip: An Illustrated Monthly Record of Nature and Country-Lore. New Series. Edited by John T. Carrington. London / Berlin: Simpking Marshall, Hamilton, Kent & Co., Ltd / R. Friedländer & Sohn.

== Owners and editors ==
From 1865 to 1893 the (Hardwicke's) Science-Gossip was published by Robert Hardwicke (London). The first editor was the mycologist Mordecai Cubitt Cooke. In 1872 he was succeeded by John Ellor Taylor, the year in which Taylor became curator of the Ipswich Museum. Taylor had founded a Science-Gossip Society in Norwich in 1868, and in 1869 a similar club for young men was formed in Ipswich in emulation of it, as a revival of the dormant Ipswich Philosophical Society. On removing to Ipswich, and taking up the editorship of the magazine, Taylor became the central figure of the Ipswich group. His health collapsed in 1893.

In 1893 John T. Carrington became proprietor of Science-Gossip, which he edited until 1902.

In 1899 "the favourite journal for amateurs devoted to Natural, Physical, and Applied Sciences," entered offices at 110 Strand, London. The editor, John T. Carrington, was then assisted by Miss F. Winstone.

After a few successful years the publication failed, probably for economic reasons. This was perhaps regretted most by people who read it at society meetings and never bought their own copies.

The idea underlying Science-Gossip was to provide for scientific studies what Notes and Queries provides for literary studies. Science Gossip is cited over 100 times in Alfred Cotgreave's 1900 contents-subject index.
