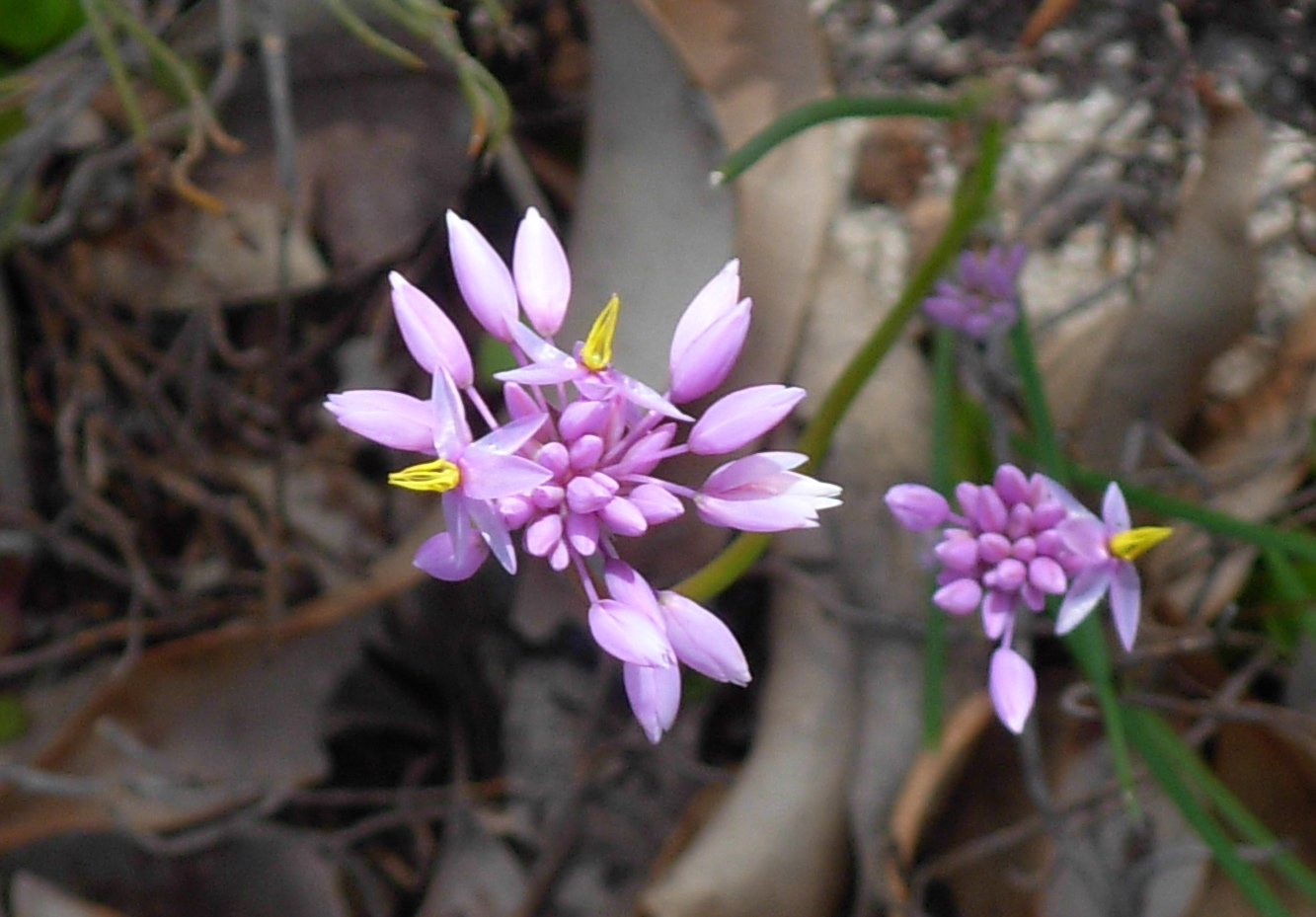
- Sowerbaea laxiflora at Drummond Nature Reserve, Western Australia

Scientific classification
- Kingdom: Plantae
- Clade: Tracheophytes
- Clade: Angiosperms
- Clade: Monocots
- Order: Asparagales
- Family: Asparagaceae
- Subfamily: Lomandroideae
- Genus: Sowerbaea; Sm.

= Sowerbaea =

Genus of herbs

Sowerbaea is a small genus of perennial herbs which are endemic to Australia.

The genus is placed in the family Asparagaceae, subfamily Lomandroideae. It has also been included in Anthericaceae and Liliaceae.

Some species may have annual above-ground growth. The habit is erect or climbing. Leaves are alternate. The flowers are grouped into umbels or other kinds of clusters. They may be white, pink, or shades of purple.

The genus was first described by James Smith in 1798. The first species to be described, Sowerbaea juncea Andrews (1800), was in the Botanists Repository, with a 1798 illustration of a specimen growing in England. The seeds of the species were cultivated in England, sometime shortly after the founding of the colony in New South Wales. Smith also described the species in the same year as Andrews, using the same name, but since the Andrews name was published first it is his description regarded as having priority.

The next species to be described was Sowerbaea laxiflora Lindl. (1839), a plant found in Western Australia.

The genus is named after the botanical illustrator James Sowerby.

Species accepted:

- Sowerbaea alliacea F.Muell. - Northern Territory
- Sowerbaea juncea Andrews - vanilla lily, rush lily, vanilla plant, chocolate flower, chocolate lily - New South Wales, Queensland, Tasmania, Victoria
- Sowerbaea laxiflora Lindl. - purple tassels, vanilla lily - Western Australia
- Sowerbaea multicaulis E.Pritz. - many-stemmed lily - Western Australia
- Sowerbaea subtilis D.A.Stewart - Queensland
