= James Sowerby =

British botanical illustrator and mineralogist (1757–1822)

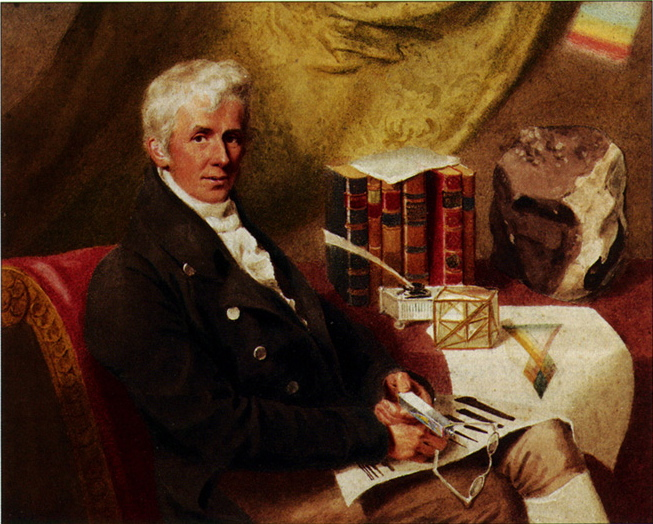
- James Sowerby painted by Thomas Heaphy (1816)
- Born: 21 March 1757; Lambeth, London, England
- Died: 25 October 1822 (aged 65); Lambeth, London, England
- Education: Royal Academy of Arts
- Occupations: Illustrator, naturalist, publisher
- Spouse: Anne Brettingham De Carle
- Children: James de Carle, George Brettingham, Charles Edward
- Parent(s): John Sowerby, Arabella Goodspeed

James Sowerby (21 March 1757 – 25 October 1822) was an English naturalist, illustrator and mineralogist. Contributions to published works, such as A Specimen of the Botany of New Holland or English Botany, include his detailed and appealing plates. The use of vivid colour and accessible texts was intended to reach a widening audience in works of natural history. The standard author abbreviation Sowerby is used to indicate this person as the author when citing a botanical name.

== Biography ==
James Sowerby was born in Lambeth, London, his parents were named John and Arabella. Having decided to become a painter of flowers his first venture was with William Curtis, whose Flora Londinensis he illustrated. Sowerby studied art at the Royal Academy and took an apprenticeship with Richard Wright. He married Anne Brettingham De Carle and they were to have four daughters and three sons: James De Carle Sowerby (1787–1871), George Brettingham Sowerby I (1788–1854) and Charles Edward Sowerby (1795–1842), the Sowerby family of naturalists. His sons and theirs were to contribute and continue the enormous volumes he was to begin and the Sowerby name was to remain associated with illustration of natural history.

An early commission for Sowerby was to lead to his prominence in the field when the botanist L'Hértier de Brutelle invited Sowerby to provide the plates for his monograph, Geranologia, and two later works. He also came to the notice of William Curtis, who was undertaking a new type of publication. Early volumes of the first British botany journal, The Botanical Magazine, contained fifty-six of his illustrations.

In 1790, he began the first of several huge projects: a 36-volume work, English Botany that was published over the next 23 years, contained 2,592 hand-coloured engravings and became known as Sowerby's Botany. An enormous number of plants were to receive their first formal publication within this work, but the authority for these came from the initially unattributed text written by James Edward Smith. The work was continued by his son, James de Carle Sowerby who published a further set of 204 plates, mostly uncoloured until the end of the first edition in 1835. Further plates were added by other hands up to 1865 ending with plate number 2,999.

It was the inclusion of science in the form of natural history, such as the thousands of botanicals supplied by Smith or his own research, that distinguished Sowerby's art from early forms of still life. This careful description of the subjects, drawing from specimens and research, was in contrast to the flower painting of the Rococo period found illuminating the books and galleries of a select audience. Sowerby intended to reach an audience whose curiosity for gardening and the natural world could be piqued by publishing the attractive and more affordable works. The appealing hand-coloured engravings also became highly valued by researchers into the new fields of science.

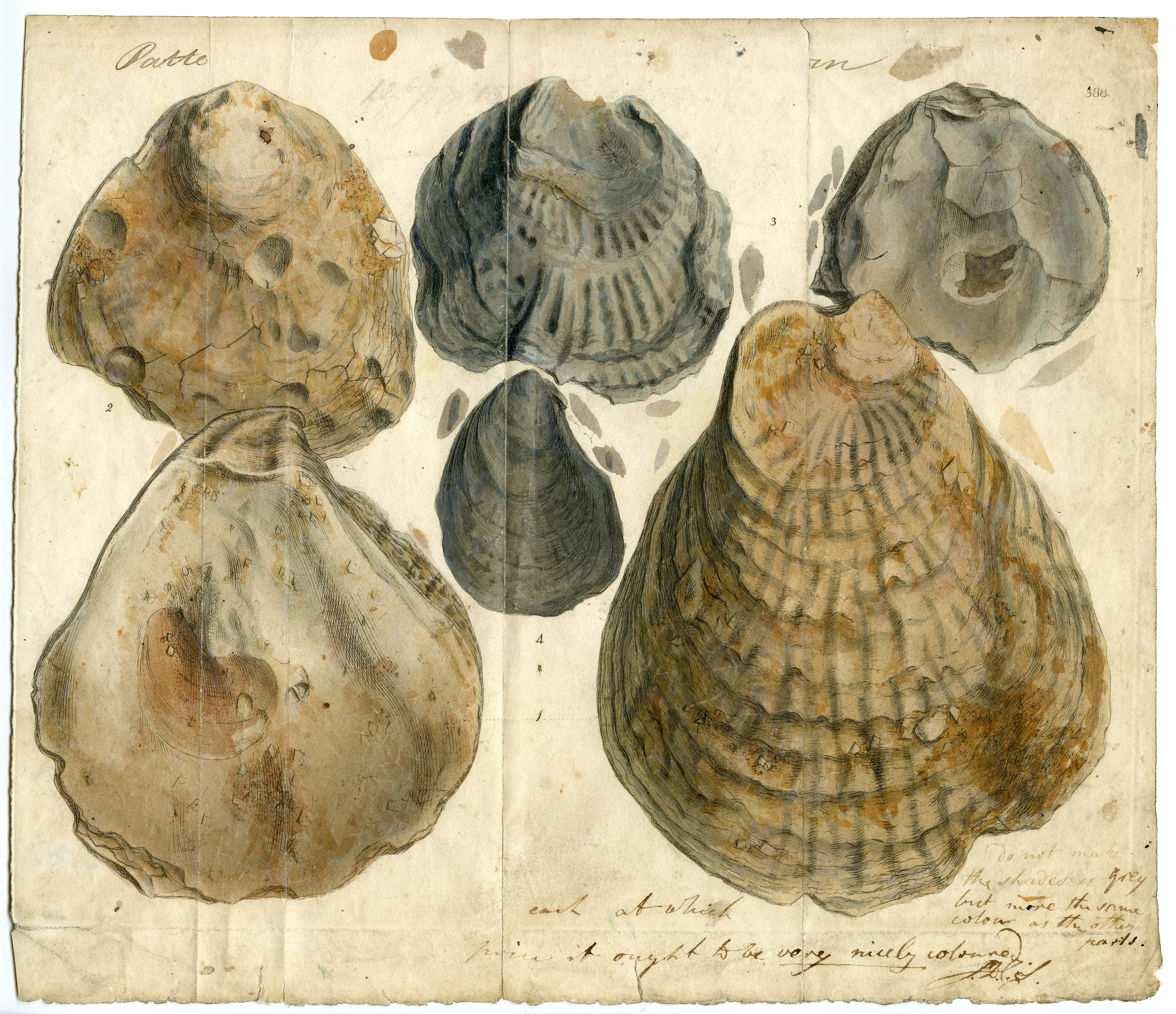
Original hand colored pattern plate for James Sowerby's "Mineral Conchology of Great Britain."

His next project was of similar scale: the Mineral Conchology of Great Britain, a comprehensive catalogue of many invertebrate fossils found in England, was published over a 34-year time-span, the latter parts by his sons James De Carle Sowerby and George Brettingham Sowerby I. The finished work contains 650 coloured plates distributed over 7 volumes.

He also developed a theory of colour and published two landmark illustrated works on mineralogy: the British Mineralogy (1804–1817) and as a supplement to it the Exotic Mineralogy (1811–1820).

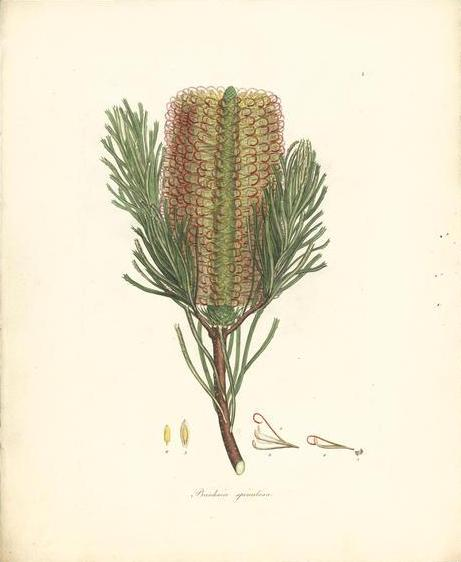
Hand-coloured print from an engraving of Banksia spinulosa from A Specimen of the Botany of New Holland by Sowerby

Sowerby retained the specimens used in the expansive volumes he helped to produce. Many notable geologists and other scientists of the day were to lend or donate specimens to his collection. He had intended that his

some thousands of minerals, many not known elsewhere, a great variety of fossils, most of the plants of English Botany about 500 preserved specimens or models of fungi, quadrupeds, birds, insects, &c. all the natural production of Great Britain

become the foundation of a museum. The addition of a room at the rear of his residence, housing this collection, was to see visits from the president of the Royal Society, Joseph Banks, and Charles Francis Greville who also lent to the informal institution. A much-sought exhibit, one that was frequently chipped for samples, was the Yorkshire meteorite; this was sighted and collected in 1795, the first recorded English meteorite.

== Legacy ==
James' great-grandson, the explorer and naturalist Arthur de Carle Sowerby continued the family tradition, providing many specimens for the British Museum and museums in Shanghai and Washington D.C.

He is also commemorated in the naming of several taxa of plants including; Sowerbaea, a genus of plant in Asparagaceae family, by Sm. in 1798, Sowerbea, a (possible) genus of plant in Liliaceae family by Dum.Cours. in 1814, and Soberbaea a (possible) genus of plant in (Liliaceae family) by D.Dietr. in 1840. Lastly, John Axel Nannfeldt in Svensk Bot. Tidskr. vol.32 on page 118 in 1938, published Sowerbyella which is a genus of fungi in the family Pyronemataceae.

== Publications ==
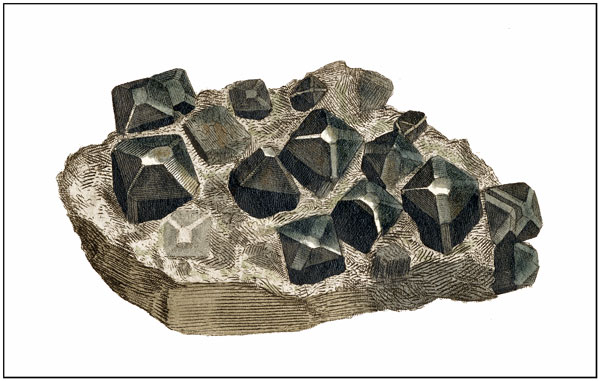
Cassiterite from Cornwall, from British Mineralogy, 1803

James Sowerby produced a large corpus of work that appeared in many different publications and journals. Some of the works begun by the paterfamilias of the Sowerby's was to be completed only by the generations that followed. His illustrations, publication and publishing concerns embraced many of the emergent fields of science. Besides the renowned botanical works, Sowerby produced extensive volumes on mycology, conchology, mineralogy and a seminal work on his colour system. He also wrote an instruction called A botanical drawing-book, or an easy introduction to drawing flowers according to nature.

- Florist's luxurians or the florist's delight, and;
- Sibthrop's Flora Graeca, 10 vols. 1806–40.
- Sowerby also supplied plates for Curtis's Flora Londinensis.
- English Botany or, Coloured Figures of British Plants, with their Essential Characters, Synonyms and Places of Growth, descriptions supplied by Sir James E. Smith, was issued as a part work over 23 years until its completion in March 1814. This work was issued in 36 volumes with 2,592 hand-coloured plates of British plants. He also published Exotic Botany in 1804.
- Smith's comprehensive work did not include Kingdom Fungi, Sowerby set out to supplement English Botany with his own text and descriptions. Coloured figures of English fungi or mushrooms, 4 vols. both appeared between 1789 and 1791.
- A Specimen of the Botany of New Holland Written by James Edward Smith and illustrated by James Sowerby, it was published by Sowerby between 1793 and 1795, becoming the first monograph on the Flora of Australia. It was prefaced with the intention of meeting the general interest in, and propagation of, the flowering species of the new antipodean colonies, while also containing a Latin and botanical description of the sample. Sowerby's own hand-coloured engravings, based upon original sketches and specimens brought to England, were both descriptive and striking in depiction.
- Zoology of New Holland by George Shaw and illustrated by James Sowerby. Published by Sowerby in 1794.
- The British miscellany, or, Coloured figures of new, rare, or little known animal subjects : many not before ascertained to be inhabitants of the British Isles : and chiefly in the possession of the author, James Sowerby[1804-1806].
- Mineral Conchology of Great Britain Digital version
- British Mineralogy: Or Coloured figures intended to elucidate the mineralogy of Great Britain (R. Taylor and co., London) was published as parts between 1802 and 1817.
- Exotic Mineralogy: Or Coloured Figures of Foreign Minerals, as a Supplement to British Mineralogy (1811), followed British Mineralogy and the scope was extended to include American specimens. Issued by subscription, the work ran to two volumes that comprised an incomplete 27 parts. Descriptions of rarities held in the 'mineral cabinets' of many notable collectors included 167 plates, brilliantly coloured by Sowerby and his family.
- A New Elucidation of Colours, Original Prismatic and Material: Showing Their Concordance in the Three Primitives, Yellow, Red and Blue: and the Means of Producing, Measuring and Mixing Them: with some Observations on the Accuracy of Sir Isaac Newton, London 1809. This work, given in homage to Isaac Newton, was to establish the importance of 'light and dark' in colour theory. He presents a theory of colour being composed of three basic colours: red, yellow and blue. Yellow, or gamboge as he had it, would become substituted by green in the later colour systems which were based on it.
- Familiar Lessons on Mineralogy and Geology (digital version), and other publications by John Mawe.

== List of selected works ==
- Sowerby, James (1804). English Botany; Or, Coloured Figures of British Plants, with Their Essential characters, synonyms, and places of growth. To which will be added, occasional remarks. London: Robert Hardwicke., see also English Botany

== See also ==
- James Edward Smith
- Henrietta Clive, Countess of Powis
- Sowerby family
- Category:Taxa named by James Sowerby

== Other sources ==
- Conklin Lawrence H. (1995). "James Sowerby, his publications and works". Reprints of Conklin articles. Archived from the original on 2 April 2015. "N.B.: This article appeared in Mineralogical Record, volume 26, July–August 1995."
