= Kobe Animal Kingdom =

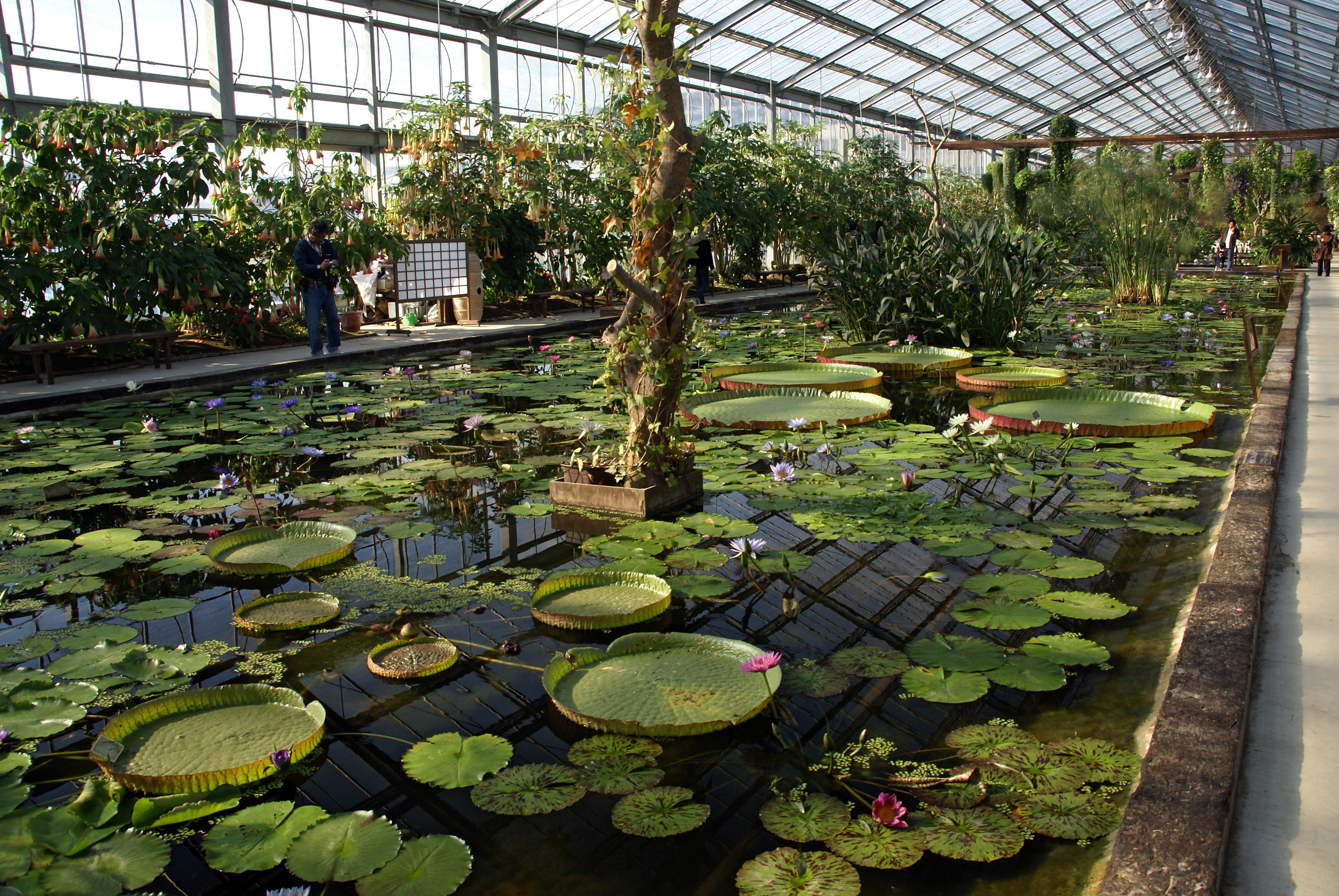
- Greenhouse interior
- Interactive map of Kobe Animal Kingdom
- 34°39′15″N 135°13′23″E
- Date opened: March 2006
- Location: Kobe, Hyōgo Prefecture, Japan
- Website: www.kobe-oukoku.com/contents/english.html

Kobe Animal Kingdom (神戸どうぶつ王国, Kōbe Dōbutsu Ōkoku) is an animal and flower park located on Port Island in Kobe, Japan. It is mainly located in and around a greenhouse. It was called Kobe Kachoen (神戸花鳥園, Kōbe Kachōen) until 18 July 2014. It is one of several theme parks created by Japanese botanist and collector Kamo Mototeru, and was opened on 15 March 2006. This all-weather park is based on the concept of contact with birds and flowers. In the park, visitors are able to touch and feed birds.

On 20 November 2013, Kobe Kachoen went bankrupt. The management rights were acquired from Kobe Kachoen by the company Kobe Animal Kingdom in March 2014, and on 19 July 2014, the park was renamed Kobe Animal Kingdom.

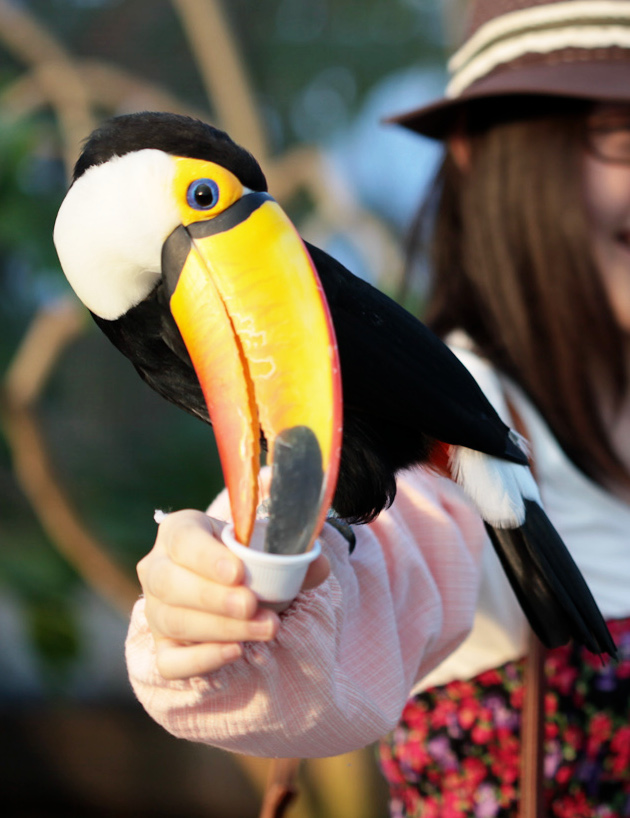
A toco toucan being fed

== Animals ==
As of 2026:

Sumatran Tiger Ecological Garden

- Sumatran tiger

Rocky Valley

- American beaver
- American black bear
- Black-tailed prairie dog
- Cougar
- Raccoon
- Timber wolf
- South American coati
- Striped skunk

Otter Sanctuary

- Asian small-clawed otter
- Malayan tapir

Sheep Hill, Alpaca Space and Camel Corner

- Alpaca
- Bactrian camel
- Corriedale sheep
- Miniature horse
- Miniature pig

Flower shower

- Miyako grass lizard

Asian Forest

- Binturong
- Pallas's cat
- Red panda

African Wetland

- African sacred ibis
- African spoonbill
- Black-faced spoonbill
- Black-necked stilt
- Blacksmith lapwing
- Common shelduck
- Eurasian wigeon
- Great white pelican
- Greater flamingo
- Mallard
- Mandarin duck
- Marabou stork
- Pygmy hippopotamus
- Ringed teal
- Ring-tailed lemur
- Rock hyrax
- Roseate spoonbill
- Ruddy shelduck
- Scarlet ibis
- White ibis

Shoebill Ecological Garden

- Japanese night heron
- Northern carmine bee-eater
- Shoebill

Tropical Forest

- Aldabra giant tortoise
- Arapaima
- Blue-and-yellow macaw
- Bush dog
- Common marmoset
- Cotton-top tamarin
- Crested partridge
- Green iguana
- Linnaeus's two-toed sloth
- Mexican spiny-tailed iguana
- Midas cichlid
- Patagonian mara
- Pygmy marmoset
- Radiated tortoise
- Red-and-green macaw
- Southern pudu
- Southern tamandua
- Southern three-banded armadillo
- Tambaqui
- Tawny frogmouth
- Victoria crowned pigeon
- Violet turaco
- Western plantain-eater
- White-bellied go-away-bird
- White-throated toucan

Tropical Wetland

- Alligator snapping turtle
- Budgett's frog
- Burmese python
- Carpet python
- Fishing cat
- Red-bellied piranha
- Smooth-fronted caiman

Penguin Coast

- African penguin

Squirrel Forest

- Japanese squirrel

Contact Animals (North area)

- Domestic cat
- Domestic dog
- Domestic rabbit
- Eclectus parrot
- Fennec fox
- Galah
- Guinea pig
- Meerkat
- Sand cat

Wild Night Animals

- Amami spiny rat
- Brown wood owl
- Egyptian fruit bat
- Japanese dwarf flying squirrel
- Kinkajou
- Northern Luzon giant cloud rat
- Pygmy slow loris
- Senegal bushbaby
- Striped possum
- Sugar glider
- Verreaux's eagle-owl
- Western barn owl

Pantanal

- Azara's agouti
- Capybara
- Collared peccary
- Giant anteater
- Red-footed tortoise
- South American tapir

KAZE no Stadium

- Aplomado falcon
- Black-chested buzzard-eagle
- Egyptian vulture
- Great green macaw
- Harris's hawk
- Lanner falcon
- Northern goshawk
- Salmon-crested cockatoo
- Scarlet macaw
- Sulphur-crested cockatoo
- Turkey vulture
- Turkmenian eagle-owl

Servals are also exhibited.
