= Robert Hardwicke =

British surgeon and publisher

Robert Hardwicke FLS (born 2 October 1822 in Dyke, Lincolnshire; died 8 March 1875) was a British surgeon and publisher of medical and natural history literature, including Hardwicke's Science-Gossip, Popular Science Review, the Journal of Botany, and the Journal of the Quekett Microscopical Club. His obituary in the American magazine Popular Science Monthly read: "What Charles Knight was to general literature, Robert Hardwicke was to science."
