= James De Carle Sowerby =

British mineralogist, botanist, and illustrator

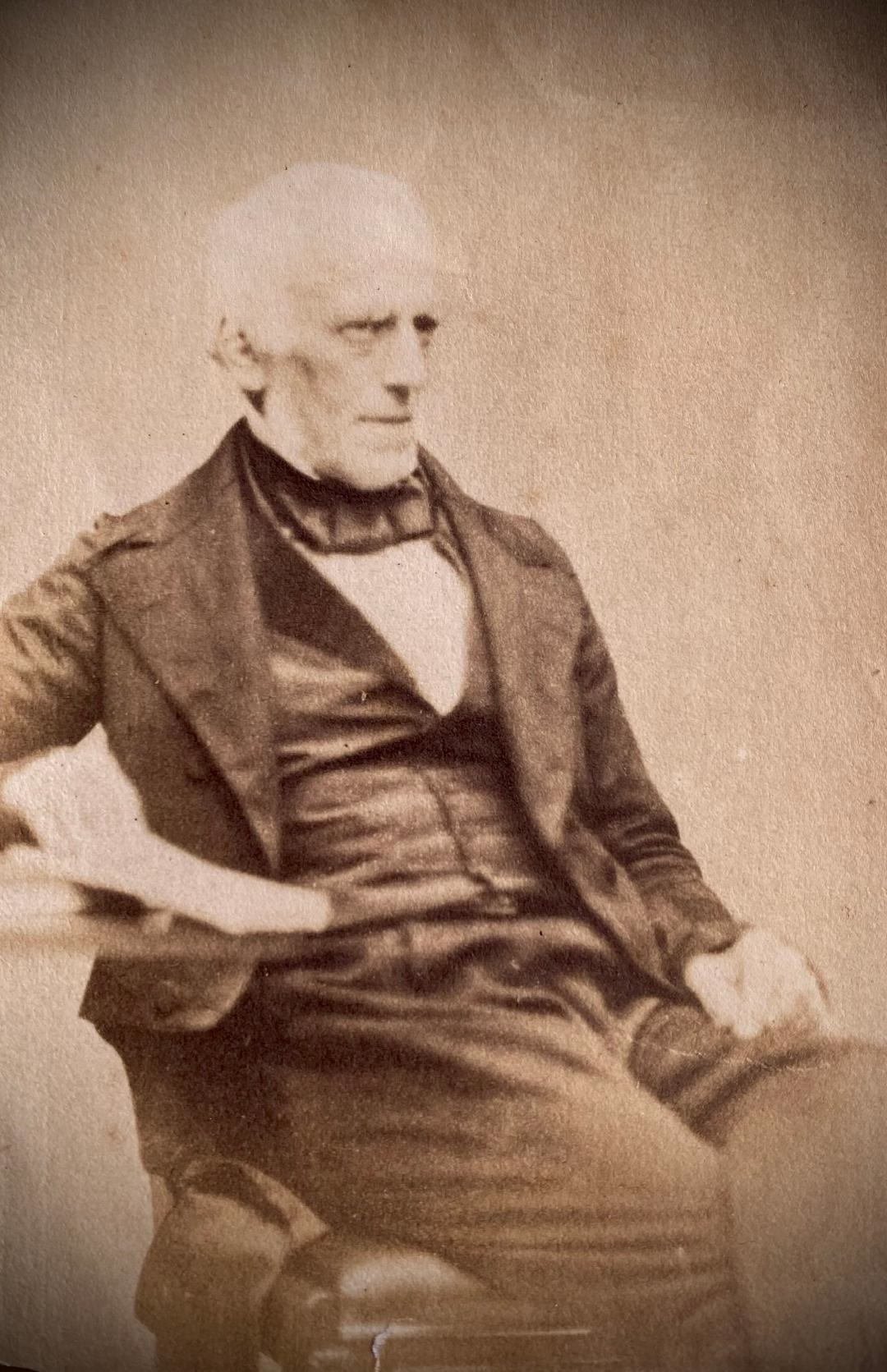
- James De Carle Sowerby
- Born: 5 June 1787; London, England
- Died: 26 August 1871 (aged 84)
- Children: 2
- Father: James Sowerby
- Relatives: George Brettingham Sowerby I

James De Carle Sowerby (5 June 1787 – 26 August 1871) was a British mineralogist, botanist, and illustrator. He received an education in chemistry.

Sowerby was born in London, the son of botanical artist James Sowerby, and his wife, Anne de Carle. He continued his father's work and published, together with his brother George Brettingham Sowerby I, the latter volumes of the Mineral Conchology of Great Britain, begun by their father.

Together with a cousin, he founded the Royal Botanic Society and Gardens, and was its secretary for 30 years.

His son William Sowerby was also a botanist and illustrator, and succeeded him as Secretary of the Royal Botanic Society in 1869.

In 1846, John William Salter (English naturalist, geologist, palaeontologist, and leading authority on trilobites) married Sally, daughter of Sowerby, and eventually fathered seven children with her.

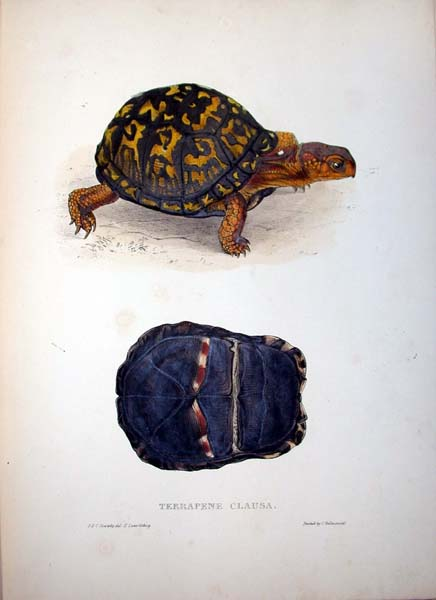
Terrapene clausa from Monograph of the Testudinata (lithograph by Edward Lear)

Sowerby died in Kilburn, London in 1871.

== See also ==
- Sowerby family
