= List of Eratoneura species =

This is a list of 197 species in Eratoneura, a genus of leafhoppers in the family Cicadellidae.

== Eratoneura species ==
- Eratoneura abjecta (Beamer, 1931)^{c g}
- Eratoneura acantha (Ross & DeLong, 1950)^{c g b}
- Eratoneura accita (Knull, 1954)^{c g}
- Eratoneura accola (McAtee, 1920)^{c g}
- Eratoneura aculeata (Beamer, 1932)^{c g}
- Eratoneura adunca (Beamer, 1932)^{c g}
- Eratoneura aesculi (Beamer, 1932)^{c g}
- Eratoneura affinis (Fitch, 1851)^{c g b}
- Eratoneura alicia (Ross, 1957)^{c g}
- Eratoneura alloplana (Ross, 1956)^{c g}
- Eratoneura amethica (Ross, 1957)^{c g}
- Eratoneura andersoni (Beamer, 1932)^{c g}
- Eratoneura anseri (Hepner, 1966)^{c g}
- Eratoneura ardens (McAtee, 1920)^{c g b}
- Eratoneura arenosa (Ross & DeLong, 1950)^{c g}
- Eratoneura arpegia (Ross, 1957)^{c g b}
- Eratoneura arta (Beamer, 1931)^{c g}
- Eratoneura ballista (Beamer, 1932)^{c g}
- Eratoneura basilaris (Say, 1825)^{c g b}
- Eratoneura beeri (Hepner, 1972)^{c g b}
- Eratoneura bella (McAtee, 1920)^{c g b}
- Eratoneura betulae Dmitriev & Dietrich, 2010^{c g}
- Eratoneura bifida (Beamer, 1931)^{c g}
- Eratoneura bigemina (McAtee, 1920)^{c g b}
- Eratoneura biramosa (Beamer, 1941)^{c g}
- Eratoneura bispinosa (Beamer, 1931)^{c g}
- Eratoneura brevipes (Beamer, 1931)^{c g}
- Eratoneura brooki (Hepner, 1969)^{c g}
- Eratoneura calamitosa (Beamer, 1931)^{c g}
- Eratoneura campora (Robinson, 1924)^{c g}
- Eratoneura carmini (Beamer, 1929)^{c g b}
- Eratoneura cera (Hepner, 1966)^{c g}
- Eratoneura certa (Beamer, 1932)^{c g}
- Eratoneura citrosa (Ross, 1956)^{c g}
- Eratoneura clara (Beamer, 1932)^{c g}
- Eratoneura claroides (Hepner, 1967)^{c g}
- Eratoneura clavipes (Beamer, 1931)^{c g}
- Eratoneura comoides (Ross & DeLong, 1953)^{c g b}
- Eratoneura concisa (Beamer, 1931)^{c g}
- Eratoneura confirmata (McAtee, 1924)^{c g b}
- Eratoneura continua (Knull & Auten, 1937)^{c g}
- Eratoneura contracta (Beamer, 1931)^{c g}
- Eratoneura corylorubra (Knull, 1945)^{c g}
- Eratoneura coxi (Ross & DeLong, 1950)^{c g}
- Eratoneura crinita (Beamer, 1932)^{c g}
- Eratoneura cristata (Knull, 1951)^{c g}
- Eratoneura curta (Beamer, 1932)^{c g}
- Eratoneura curvata (Beamer, 1931)^{c g}
- Eratoneura delongi (Knull & Auten, 1937)^{c g}
- Eratoneura dimidiata (Knull, 1949)^{c g}
- Eratoneura dira (Beamer, 1931)^{c g}
- Eratoneura direpta (Knull, 1949)^{c g}
- Eratoneura distincta (Knull & Auten, 1937)^{c g}
- Eratoneura dumosa (Beamer, 1932)^{c g}
- Eratoneura econa (Ross, 1957)^{c g}
- Eratoneura ellisi (Hepner, 1969)^{c g}
- Eratoneura emquu (Ross & DeLong, 1953)^{c g}
- Eratoneura era (McAtee, 1920)^{c g b}
- Eratoneura eversi (Ross & DeLong, 1953)^{c g}
- Eratoneura externa (Beamer, 1931)^{c g}
- Eratoneura facota (Beamer, 1932)^{c g}
- Eratoneura fausta (Knull, 1951)^{c g}
- Eratoneura fergersoni (Hepner, 1969)^{c g}
- Eratoneura firma (Beamer, 1932)^{c g}
- Eratoneura flexibilis (Knull, 1949)^{c g}
- Eratoneura forfex (Beamer, 1932)^{c g}
- Eratoneura fulleri (Hepner, 1967)^{c g b}
- Eratoneura gemina (McAtee, 1920)^{c g}
- Eratoneura gemoides (Ross, 1953)^{c g}
- Eratoneura geronimoi (Knull, 1945)^{c g}
- Eratoneura gilesi (Hepner, 1966)^{c g}
- Eratoneura gillettei (Beamer, 1931)^{c g}
- Eratoneura glicilla (Ross, 1956)^{c g}
- Eratoneura greeni (Hepner, 1969)^{c g}
- Eratoneura guicei (Hepner, 1972)^{c g}
- Eratoneura harnedi (Hepner, 1966)^{c g}
- Eratoneura harpola (Ross, 1956)^{c g}
- Eratoneura hartii (Gillette, 1898)^{c g b}
- Eratoneura havana (Ross & DeLong, 1953)^{c g}
- Eratoneura haysensis (Hepner, 1966)^{c g}
- Eratoneura hyalina (Knull & Auten, 1937)^{c g}
- Eratoneura hymac (Robinson, 1924)^{c g}
- Eratoneura hymettana (Knull, 1949)^{c g b}
- Eratoneura igella (Ross & DeLong, 1950)^{c g}
- Eratoneura imbricariae (Ross & DeLong, 1953)^{c g b}
- Eratoneura immota (Beamer, 1932)^{c g}
- Eratoneura impar (Beamer, 1931)^{c g}
- Eratoneura incondita (Beamer, 1932)^{c g}
- Eratoneura inepta (Beamer, 1932)^{c g}
- Eratoneura ingrata (Beamer, 1932)^{c g}
- Eratoneura inksana (Knull, 1954)^{c g}
- Eratoneura interna (Beamer, 1931)^{c g}
- Eratoneura knighti (Beamer, 1932)^{c g}
- Eratoneura knullae (Ross, 1953)^{c g}
- Eratoneura lamucata (Ross & DeLong, 1953)^{c g}
- Eratoneura lata (Beamer, 1932)^{c g}
- Eratoneura lawsoni (Robinson, 1924)^{c g}
- Eratoneura lenta (Beamer, 1932)^{c g b}
- Eratoneura levecki (Hepner, 1966)^{c g}
- Eratoneura ligata (McAtee, 1920)^{c g b}
- Eratoneura linea (Beamer, 1932)^{c g}
- Eratoneura longa (Knull, 1955)^{c g}
- Eratoneura longifurca (Hepner, 1966)^{c g}
- Eratoneura luculenta (Knull, 1949)^{c g}
- Eratoneura lucyae (Hepner, 1966)^{c g}
- Eratoneura lunata (McAtee, 1924)^{c g b}
- Eratoneura lundi (Hepner, 1967)^{c g}
- Eratoneura lusoria (Van Duzee, 1924)^{c g}
- Eratoneura macra (Beamer, 1932)^{c g}
- Eratoneura maculata (Gillette, 1898)^{c g}
- Eratoneura maga (Knull, 1951)^{c g}
- Eratoneura malaca (Knull, 1949)^{c g}
- Eratoneura manus (Beamer, 1932)^{c g}
- Eratoneura marilandicae (Ross, 1957)^{c g}
- Eratoneura marra (Beamer, 1932)^{c g}
- Eratoneura mcateei Dmitriev & Dietrich, 2010^{c g}
- Eratoneura mensa (Beamer, 1931)^{c g}
- Eratoneura metopia (Ross, 1957)^{c g}
- Eratoneura micheneri (Hepner, 1972)^{c g b}
- Eratoneura millsi (Ross & DeLong, 1950)^{c g}
- Eratoneura mimica (Ross, 1957)^{c g}
- Eratoneura minor (Beamer, 1932)^{c g}
- Eratoneura mira (Beamer, 1932)^{c g b}
- Eratoneura mirifica (Beamer, 1932)^{c g}
- Eratoneura misera (Beamer, 1932)^{c g}
- Eratoneura morgani (DeLong, 1916)^{c g b}
- Eratoneura nevadensis (Beamer, 1932)^{c g}
- Eratoneura nigriventer (Beamer, 1931)^{c g}
- Eratoneura nimia (Knull, 1954)^{c g}
- Eratoneura noncuspidis (Beamer, 1931)^{c g b}
- Eratoneura omani (Beamer, 1930)^{c g}
- Eratoneura opulenta (Beamer, 1932)^{c g b}
- Eratoneura osborni (DeLong, 1916)^{c g b}
- Eratoneura pamelae (Hepner, 1967)^{c g}
- Eratoneura paraesculi (Knull, 1945)^{c g b}
- Eratoneura parallela (McAtee, 1924)^{c g}
- Eratoneura parva (Beamer, 1932)^{c g b}
- Eratoneura parvipes (Beamer, 1931)^{c g}
- Eratoneura patris (Ross & DeLong, 1953)^{c g}
- Eratoneura penerostrata (Beamer, 1932)^{c g}
- Eratoneura penesica (Beamer, 1931)^{c g}
- Eratoneura phellos (Ross & DeLong, 1953)^{c g}
- Eratoneura prolixa (Knull, 1949)^{c g}
- Eratoneura propria (Beamer, 1932)^{c g}
- Eratoneura protuma (Ross, 1957)^{c g}
- Eratoneura pyra (McAtee, 1924)^{c g}
- Eratoneura rangifer (Ross & DeLong, 1950)^{c g}
- Eratoneura restricta (Beamer, 1932)^{c g b}
- Eratoneura retusa (Beamer, 1932)^{c g}
- Eratoneura richardsi (Ross, 1953)^{c g}
- Eratoneura robusta (Knull, 1955)^{c g}
- Eratoneura rostrata (Beamer, 1931)^{c g}
- Eratoneura rotunda (Beamer, 1931)^{c g}
- Eratoneura rubranotata (Beamer, 1927)^{c g}
- Eratoneura rubraza (Robinson, 1924)^{c g b}
- Eratoneura sancta (Beamer, 1932)^{c g}
- Eratoneura sanctaerosae (Hepner, 1967)^{c g}
- Eratoneura sandersoni (Ross, 1956)^{c g}
- Eratoneura sebringensis (Hepner, 1966)^{c g}
- Eratoneura separata (Beamer, 1932)^{c g}
- Eratoneura severini (Knull, 1949)^{c g}
- Eratoneura smithi (Ross, 1956)^{c g}
- Eratoneura socia (Knull, 1954)^{c g}
- Eratoneura solita (Beamer, 1932)^{c g b}
- Eratoneura sorota (Hepner, 1975)^{c g}
- Eratoneura spala (Ross & DeLong, 1950)^{c g}
- Eratoneura spinea (Knull, 1951)^{c g}
- Eratoneura spinifera (Beamer, 1931)^{c g}
- Eratoneura staffordi (Hepner, 1966)^{c g}
- Eratoneura staminea (Knull, 1954)^{c g}
- Eratoneura stannardi (Hepner, 1967)^{c g}
- Eratoneura stephensoni (Beamer, 1931)^{c g b}
- Eratoneura stoveri (Ross & DeLong, 1950)^{c g}
- Eratoneura stupkaorum (Knull, 1945)^{c g}
- Eratoneura tammina (Ross & DeLong, 1953)^{c g}
- Eratoneura tantilla (Beamer, 1931)^{c g}
- Eratoneura tantula (Knull, 1954)^{c g}
- Eratoneura tenuitas (Knull, 1954)^{c g}
- Eratoneura teres (Beamer, 1931)^{c g}
- Eratoneura tersa (Knull, 1951)^{c g}
- Eratoneura teshi (Hepner, 1972)^{c g}
- Eratoneura texana (Beamer, 1929)^{c g}
- Eratoneura torella (Robinson, 1924)^{c g}
- Eratoneura trautmanae (Knull, 1945)^{c g}
- Eratoneura triangulata (Beamer, 1931)^{c g}
- Eratoneura trivittata (Robinson, 1924)^{c g b}
- Eratoneura tumida (Knull, 1954)^{c g}
- Eratoneura turgida (Beamer, 1931)^{c g}
- Eratoneura unca (Knull, 1954)^{c g}
- Eratoneura uncinata (Beamer, 1931)^{c g}
- Eratoneura ungulata (Beamer, 1932)^{c g b}
- Eratoneura unica (Beamer, 1932)^{c g}
- Eratoneura usitata (Beamer, 1932)^{c g}
- Eratoneura uvaldeana (Knull, 1949)^{c g}
- Eratoneura valida (Knull, 1954)^{c g}
- Eratoneura vittata (Knull & Auten, 1937)^{c g}
- Eratoneura zioni (Beamer, 1932)^{c g}

Data sources: i = ITIS, c = Catalogue of Life, g = GBIF, b = Bugguide.net
