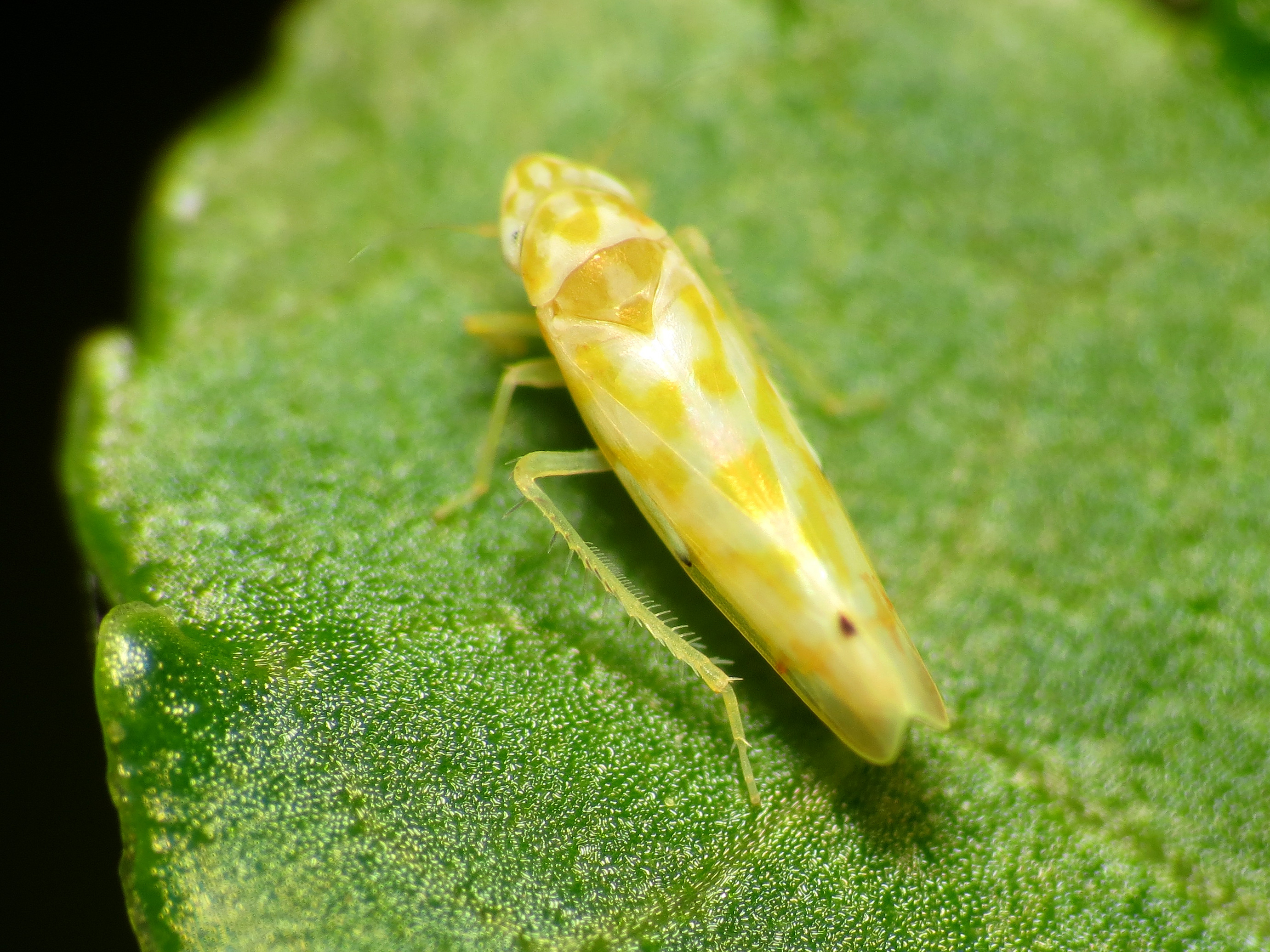

Scientific classification
- Kingdom: Animalia
- Phylum: Arthropoda
- Class: Insecta
- Order: Hemiptera
- Suborder: Auchenorrhyncha
- Family: Cicadellidae
- Subfamily: Typhlocybinae
- Tribe: Erythroneurini; Young, 1952

Genera
- See text

= Erythroneurini =

Tribe of leafhoppers

Erythroneurini is a tribe of leafhoppers in the subfamily Typhlocybinae, with over 200 genera.

== Genera ==
- Aaka Dworakowska, 1972
- Accacidia Dworakowska, 1971
- Ahmedra Dworakowska & Viraktamath, 1979
- Aidola Melichar, 1914
- Aisa Dworakowska, 1979
- Ajika Dworakowska, 1979
- Alerrawia Dmitriev, 2016
- Alnetoidia Dlabola, 1958
- Amazygina Dietrich & Dmitriev, 2006
- Ambara Dworakowska, 1981
- Andrabia Ahmed, 1970
- Anufrievia Dworakowska, 1970
- Anzygina Fletcher & Larivière, 2009
- Arboridia Zachvatkin, 1946
- Arbosiria Dworakowska, 1994
- Asianidia Zachvatkin, 1946
- Assina Dworakowska, 1979
- Aylala Dworakowska, 1994
- Aztegina Dietrich & Dmitriev, 2006
- Bakera Mahmood, 1967
- Bakshia Dworakowska, 1977
- Balanda Dworakowska, 1979
- Barinaga Dworakowska, 1995
- Baya Dworakowska, 1972
- Bengueta Mahmood, 1967
- Bogorya Dworakowska, 2011
- Borsukia Dworakowska, 2011
- Cassianeura Ramakrishnan & Menon, 1973
- Cerkira Dworakowska, 1994
- Cerneura Ghauri, 1978
- Chagria Dworakowska, 1994
- Chikava Dworakowska, 1995
- Chujophila Dworakowska, 1997
- Ciudadrea Dworakowska, 1970
- Coganoa Dworakowska, 1976
- Coloana Dworakowska, 1971
- Cubnara Dworakowska, 1979
- Czarnastopa Dworakowska, 2011
- Damaniana Dmitriev & Dietrich, 2006
- Davmata Dworakowska, 1979
- Diomma Motschulsky, 1863
- Dipemura Dworakowska, 2011
- Dorycnia Dworakowska, 1972
- Duanjina Kuoh, 1981
- Elbelus Mahmood, 1967
- Eldama Dworakowska, 1972
- Empoascanara Distant, 1918
- Erasmoneura Young, 1952
- Eratoneura Young, 1952
- Eryascara Dworakowska, 1995
- Erythridula Young, 1952
- Erythroneura Fitch, 1851
- Eterna Dworakowska, 2011
- Fractata Song & Li, 2011
- Frutioidia Zachvatkin, 1946
- Gambialoa Dworakowska, 1972
- Georgetta Dworakowska, 2011
- Gindara Dworakowska, 1980
- Gladkara Dworakowska, 1995
- Goska Dworakowska, 1981
- Gredzinskiya Dworakowska, 1972
- Hajra Dworakowska, 1981
- Hamagina Dietrich & Dmitriev, 2006
- Hamata Cao, Dmitriev, Dietrich & Zhang, 2019
- Harmata Dworakowska, 1976
- Hauptidia Dworakowska, 1970
- Helionidia Zachvatkin, 1946
- Hepneriana Dworakowska, 1972
- Hepzygina Dietrich & Dmitriev, 2006
- Hymetta McAtee, 1919
- Ifeneura Ghauri, 1975
- Illinigina Dietrich & Dmitriev, 2006
- Imbecilla Dworakowska, 1970
- Imugina Mahmood, 1967
- Irenaneura Cao, Huang & Zhang, 2012
- Iseza Dworakowska, 1981
- Ivorycoasta Dworakowska, 1972
- Jalalia Ahmed, 1970
- Jotwa Dworakowska, 1995
- Kabakra Dworakowska, 1979
- Kadrabia Dworakowska & Sohi, 1978
- Kanguza Dworakowska, 1972
- Kapsa Dworakowska, 1972
- Kaukania Dworakowska, 1972
- Kelmensa Dworakowska, 2011
- Keuria Theron, 1988
- Koperta Dworakowska, 1972
- Kropka Dworakowska, 1970
- Kusala Dworakowska, 1981
- Kwempia Ahmed, 1979
- Laciniata Song & Li, 2013
- Lamtoana Dworakowska, 1972
- Lankama Dworakowska, 1994
- Lectotypella Dworakowska, 1972
- Leuconeura Ishihara, 1978
- Levigata Cao, Dmitriev, Dietrich & Zhang, 2019
- Lichtrea Dworakowska, 1976
- Lisciasta Dworakowska, 1995
- Lublinia Dworakowska, 1970
- Luvanda Dworakowska, 1995
- Makia Dmitriev & Dietrich, 2006
- Mandola Dworakowska & Viraktamath, 1975
- Mangganeura Ghauri, 1967
- Matsumurina Dworakowska, 1972
- Meremra Dworakowska & Viraktamath, 1979
- Mexigina Dietrich & Dmitriev, 2006
- Mfutila Dworakowska, 1974
- Mitjaevia Dworakowska, 1970
- Mizeria Dworakowska, 1994
- Molopopterus Jacobi, 1910
- Motaga Dworakowska, 1979
- Musbrnoia Dworakowska, 1972
- Nababia Dworakowska, 1994
- Nandara Dworakowska, 1984
- Napogina Dietrich & Dmitriev, 2006
- Nedotepa Dmitriev, 2016
- Negoneura McKamey, 2006
- Nelionidia Dietrich & Dmitriev, 2006
- Neoimbecilla Dietrich & Dmitriev, 2006
- Neolokia Dmitriev & Dietrich, 2006
- Neozygina Dietrich & Dmitriev, 2006
- Ngoma Dworakowska, 1974
- Ngombela Dworakowska, 1974
- Ngunga Dworakowska, 1974
- Niedoida Dworakowska, 1994
- Nitta Dworakowska, 1995
- Nkaanga Dworakowska, 1974
- Nkonba Dworakowska, 1974
- Nkumba Dworakowska, 1974
- Nsanga Dworakowska, 1974
- Nsesa Dworakowska, 1974
- Nsimbala Dworakowska, 1974
- Ntanga Dworakowska, 1974
- Ntotila Dworakowska, 1974
- Nzinga Dworakowska, 1974
- Olszewskia Dworakowska, 1974
- Ossuaria Dworakowska, 1979
- Otbatara Dworakowska, 1984
- Parathaia Kuoh, 1982
- Pasara Dworakowska, 1981
- Penangiana Mahmood, 1967
- Perugina Dietrich & Dmitriev, 2006
- Pettya Kirkaldy, 1906
- Plumosa Sohi, 1977
- Proskura Dworakowska, 1981
- Pseudothaia Kuoh, 1982
- Punctigerella Vilbaste, 1968
- Qadria Mahmood, 1967
- Raabeina Dworakowska, 1972
- Ramania Dworakowska, 1972
- Ranbara Dworakowska, 1983
- Ratburella Ramakrishnan & Menon, 1973
- Ratjalia Dworakowska, 1981
- Ratsiraka Dworakowska, 1997
- Rhusia Theron, 1977
- Rolwalia Thapa, 1989
- Rossmoneura Dietrich & Dmitriev, 2006
- Rufitidia Dworakowska, 1994
- Saccata Cao & Zhang, 2013
- Sajda Dworakowska, 1981
- Salka Dworakowska, 1972
- Sanatana Dworakowska, 1984
- Sandanella Mahmood, 1967
- Sempia Dworakowska, 1970
- Seriana Dworakowska, 1971
- Singapora Mahmood, 1967
- Sirosoma McAtee, 1933
- Ska Dworakowska, 1976
- Songana Song & Li, 2017
- Spinigina Dietrich & Dmitriev, 2006
- Stehliksia Dworakowska, 1972
- Szymczakowskia Dworakowska, 1974
- Tamaricella Zachvatkin, 1946
- Tautoneura Anufriev, 1969
- Thaia Ghauri, 1962
- Thailus Mahmood, 1967
- Thaioneura Song, Li & Dietrich, 2016
- Thaiora Dworakowska, 1995
- Thapaia Dmitriev & Dietrich, 2006
- Thecana Thapa, 1989
- Theroniana Dmitriev & Dietrich, 2006
- Toroa Ahmed, 1979
- Tuzinka Dworakowska & Viraktamath, 1979
- Undulivena Song & Li, 2019
- Urmila Dworakowska, 1981
- Variolosa Cao & Zhang, 2013
- Vermara Dworakowska, 1980
- Vrba Dworakowska, 1997
- Watara Dworakowska, 1977
- Witera Dworakowska, 1981
- Yakuza Dworakowska, 2002
- Yeia Dworakowska, 1995
- Zadra Dworakowska, 1997
- Zanjoneura Ghauri, 1974
- Ziczacella Anufriev, 1970
- Zinga Dworakowska, 1972
- Zygina Fieber, 1866
- Zyginama Dietrich & Dmitriev, 2006
- Zyginidia Haupt, 1929
- Zyginopsis Ramakrishnan & Menon, 1973
