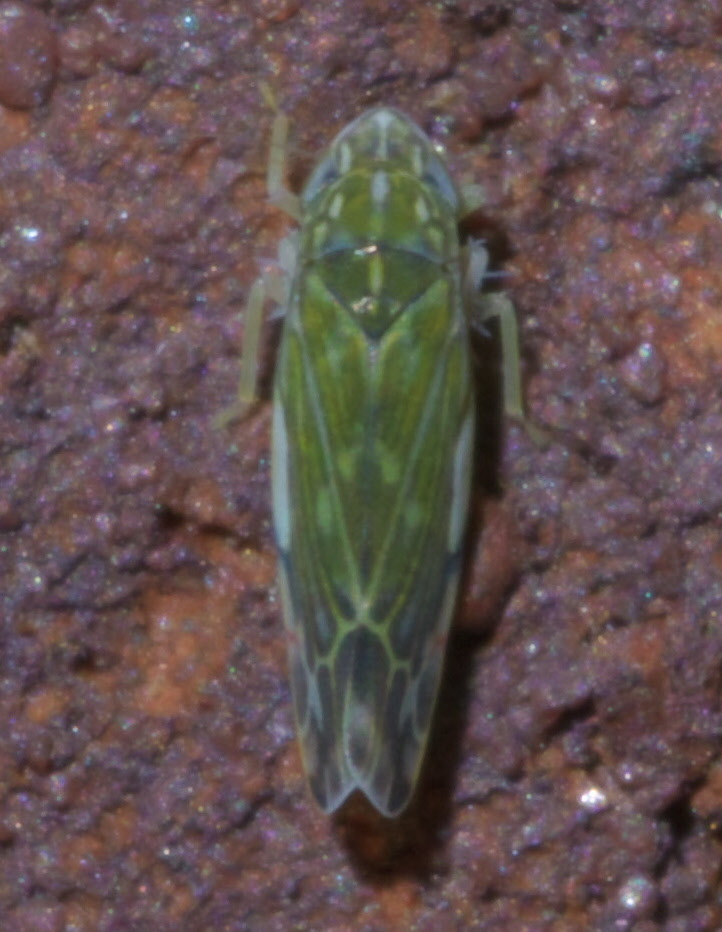

Scientific classification
- Kingdom: Animalia
- Phylum: Arthropoda
- Clade: Pancrustacea
- Class: Insecta
- Order: Hemiptera
- Suborder: Auchenorrhyncha
- Family: Cicadellidae
- Genus: Erasmoneura
- Species: E. vulnerata

Binomial name
- Erasmoneura vulnerata (Fitch, 1851)

Synonyms
- Typhlocyba vulneata Lugger 1896; Erythroneura gradata Robinson 1926

= Erasmoneura vulnerata =

Species of leafhopper

Erasmoneura vulnerata is a species of leafhopper native to North America. The species was found to be in Europe in 2004 where it causes significant economic damage to grapevine yards. E. vulnerata is commonly found on wild and cultivated grapes from both continents. Its Latin name translates to "wounded Erasmoneura" from its original description.

== Taxonomy ==
Erasmoneura vulnerata was originally described by A. Fitch in 1851. Upon discovery, Fitch placed the species in the Erythroneura genus as "Erythroneura vulnerata". Over a century after original discovery, D. A. Young named Erasmoneura as a subgenus of Erythroneura. The species in question was then known as Erythroneura Erasmoneura vulnerata. It was not until 2006 that Erasmoneura was elevated to generic status, allowing the previously known Erythroneura vulnerata to be known as Erasmoneura vulnerata. Additionally, it was discovered that Erythroneura gradata was simply a seasonal color variation of E. vulnerata.

== Physical description ==
Adults have a body size of roughly 2.7-3.2mm long and their body has a yellow stripe that longitudinally divides it. A seasonal color dimorphism occurs, with the summer population possessing a red transversal vein at the base of the first apical cell. The summer population also has bluish patches on their forewings. At the end of the season, these become more green-brown whereas the transversal veins often appear white. The nymphs have yellow marbled patches over a reddish-brown body with light green legs. The thorax and vertex is dorsoventrally flattened.

=== Male genitalia ===
The male genitalia is used to identify species of the Erasmoneura genus using an interactive key.

Dorsal appendage is bifurcated apically, the pygofer lobe is rounded. Subgential plates protrude. The aedeagus is distally trilobate with horn-like lateral processes in dorsal view. In lateral view, it is bearing a dorso-caudaly directed, apically rounded processes. Dorsal apodeme of aedeagus with ligaments connected to pygofer appendages; anal tube without processes. Subgenital plates protrude beyond the distal margin or pygofer.

=== Original description ===
Below is the original description for E. vulnerata from A. Fitch in 1851.

"Wounded erythroneura E. vulnerata. Fulvous-brown spotted and lined with whitish; elytra with an abbreviated yellowish- white vitta on the outer margin, interrupted near the middle by an oblique sanguineous one; tips dusky, with whitish nervures and spots; a whitish medial line common to the vertex, thorax and scutel; beneath black, legs pallid. Length 0.12, on raspberry bushes, grape vines and other situations where the foliage is dense, often in great numbers".

== Distribution ==
Erasmoneura vulnerata is native to North America. It is widely distributed in both Canada and the USA. It is also found in Mexico. The species was first found in Europe in 2004 as an invasive species. It was found in the region of Veneto in northern Italy recorded on Vitis vinifera. By 2005, the species had migrated to other nearby regions in Italy. By 2010 it was found in Slovenia. The leafhopper can move easily by flight or by attaching and travelling with cars which can accelerate its spread. In 2018 the presence of E. vulnerata was confirmed to be in Romania. The species was additionally found in Switzerland in 2019. Recently, the species was also found to have a few occurrences in Serbia.

== Life cycle and reproduction ==
Within their native range adults overwinter near vineyard margins where there is adequate canopy cover, inside plant structures or organic material. Similarly, it was observed in Italy that buildings and hedgerows near vineyards seem to be important for the overwintering of the leafhopper. Common overwintering species can include the canopy of V. labrusca and V. vinifera cultivars. Adults will move away from their overwintering sites towards vineyards beginning April around bud break. In their native range it is found that the female leafhoppers oviposit in the vascular bundles on the leaf midrib as well as on the top surface of the leaf. Leafhoppers are hemimetabolous and develop through five nymphal instars.

Early instar nymphs can be first detected in late May while older nymph populations peak in June. Time for egg development is 16-20 days whereas overall development for adults requires 35-38 days. Two generations of E. vulnerata per year is detected in their native range. However, 3 peaks are recorded in nymph densities in Europe suggesting the species is capable of 3 generations a year. Its additionally found that the 2nd generation is the most abundant.

== Host plants and damage ==
Exivae is commonly observed on host leaves' undersides whereas both nymph instars and adults will mainly inhabit the upper leaf surfaces. Both the nymph and adult E. vulnerata eat the leaf parenchymal cells causing speckled white lesions on the leaf surface. If the damage is significant the lesions can fuse, causing large portions of discolored tissue. The leaf has potential to prematurely fall at this point. The leafhopper is commonly found in V. vinifera vineyards in Europe, infesting various cultivars equally. Vitis labrusca and the Judas tree (Cercis siliquastrum) are also attractive host plants for the adults. Additionally, E. vulnerata was observed on Parthenocissus quinquefolia in Romania. It has been recorded on many other host plants such as Aesculus sp, Rubus sp, and Salix species although the frequency of their collection on these plants is significantly lower than on Vitis species.

== Habitat ==
Erasmoneura vulnerata is commonly found on the foliage of Vitis within vineyards in both its native and invaded range. The species also has been recorded on wild Vitis numerous time within its native range. This commonly will be in wooded areas, and along riverbanks. In the winter the adults migrate to their overwintering areas which can be under plant debris or in woody areas. The adults may also overwinter near hedgerows or rural buildings.

== Predation ==
Within their invaded habitat, Europe, E. vulnerata have few naturally occurring predators and parasitoids. Several species predate on E. vulnerata, including various species from the Heteroptera and Neuroptera groups. Specific examples include Orius spp, and Chrysoperla carnea which were observed feeding on nymphs. Other nymphs were also seen preying on E. vulnerata nymphs such as species from Allothrombium. Those in the family Mymaridaeadditionally can parasitize E. vulnerata. It was also found that generalist predators Chrysoperla carnea and Orius majusculus effectively suppress E. vulnerata abundance in the field.

== Behavior ==
Although information lacks about the specific behavior of E. vulnerata, assumptions can be made based on closely related species. The subfamily Typhlocybinae, which E. vulnerata belongs to, is a diverse group of small leafhoppers that feed primarily on leaf parenchymal cell contents. Leafhoppers transmit vibrational signals through plant matter to communicate with others of its species. For members of the genus Erasmoneura, courtship communications begins with a 3 part male vibrational signal that will always precede copulation. The males will initiate the duet, followed by searching behaviors and then more complex signaling. The females may also emit vibrational signals while the male communicates. Due to differences in temporal features of their signals, overlapping male signals of different species are possible in a given area.

== Control ==
The abundance of E. vulnerata is higher in organic vineyards compared to non-organic vineyards. There are higher densities of nymph populations and parasitism rates in organic vineyards. Organic vineyards can be managed with options such as natural insecticides like pyrethrins, sulfur and kaolin. These options are typically less effective than traditional insecticides. Traditional insecticides that have proved to be the most effective against E. vulnerata include acetamiprid and flupyradifurone. A single application of these at the beginning of the 2nd generation maintains populations at a low level for a few weeks. The most effective natural application is the use of kaolin, although it is not an insecticide, it is a clay mineral that reduces population densities by inhibiting the leafhoppers from feeding.

== Pest status ==
Within its native range, there have been contradictory findings as to whether or not E. vulnerata is of pest status. In earlier literature E. vulnerata was reported as a pest of grape. Additionally, E. vulnerata was found to be of secondary pest status in North American vine yards that were treated to protect again the more damaging E. ziczac. In its invaded range, Italy, the species was originally found to have low occurrence rates in commercial vineyards that were treated for the more harmful S. titanus. More recently, E. vulnerata has begun to spread throughout Europe and cause significant damage to vineyards. At the current moment, E. vulnerata is considered a serious pest in Italy.

== Economic importance ==
The subfamily Typhlocybinae has no significant positive economic importance. However, those of the tribe Erythroneurini are often pests to grape vineyards. This is true for E. vulnerata which is a well documented invasive pest within its invaded range of Italy.

Although there is no direct economic gain, leafhoppers are common prey for those of the Neuroptera order. These are consequently economically beneficial by feeding on various agricultural pests.

== Phylogeny and genetics ==
The Erasmoneura genus is part of the Erythroneurini tribe, which is classified under the Typhlocybinae subfamily. The classification of this tribe is challenging due to the fragile nature of the leaf hoppers bodies, making it difficult to analyze specific morphological features. The genus contains 14 accepted species including E. fulmina and E. atra. The subfamily Typhlocybinae is monophyletic and its sister group is Mileewinae, based on analysis of both morphological features and 28s rDNA sequence data. Results of phylogenetic analysis also supports the monophyly of the tribe Erythroneurini, which has a sister relationship the group Dikraneurini. The split between these tribes was estimated to be at 76 MYA. From phylogenetic analysis it is also thought that the Erasmoneura genus is monophyletic and sister to the Erythroneura and Eratoneura clades.

The barcode for E. vulnerata is not available from barcode of life, however a single unspecified individual from Ontario, Canada in the Erasmoneura genus was sequenced.
