= Anagrus atomus =

Scientific classification
- Kingdom: Animalia
- Phylum: Arthropoda
- Class: Insecta
- Order: Hymenoptera
- Family: Mymaridae
- Genus: Anagrus
- Species: A. atomus

Binomial name
- Anagrus atomus (Linnaeus, 1767)

Synonyms
- List: Ichneumon atomos (Linnaeus, 1767); Ichneumon atomus Linnaeus, 1767; Anagrus (Anagrus) atomus (Linnaeus, 1767); Anagrus lindberginae Nugnes & Viggiani, 2014; Anagrus (Anagrus) erythroneurae S. Trjapitzin & Chiappini, 1994; Anagrus erythroneurae S. Trjapitzin & Chiappini, 1994; Anagrus devius Soyka, 1956; Anagrus gabitzi Soyka, 1956; Anagrus hundsheimensis Soyka, 1956; Anagrus kressbachi Soyka, 1956; Anagrus lemonicolor Soyka, 1956; Anagrus levis Soyka, 1956; Anagrus varius Soyka, 1956; Anagrus tullgreni Hedqvist, 1954; Anagrus minimus Menozzi, 1942; Anagrus bartheli Tullgren, 1916; Anagrus nepetellae Viggiani & Nugnes; Anagrus proscassellatii Viggiani & Jesu, 1995; Anagrus stammeri Soyka, 1956; Anagrus spiritus Girault, 1911; Cynipsichneumon atomus (Linnaeus, 1767); Mymar atomos Linnaeus; Mymar atomus (Linnaeus, 1767)

Species of fairyfly

Anagrus atomus is a species of fairyfly. It is an egg parasitoid of Arboridia kermanshah, the grape leafhopper.
