= Zykina =

Zykina (Russian: Зы́кина) is a Russian female surname, male is Zykin. Notable people with the surname include:

- Lyudmila Zykina (1929–2009), Russian folk singer
- Olesya Zykina (born 1980), Russian athlete

== See also ==
- 4879 Zykina, minor planet
- Zygina
