= List of Erythridula species =

This is a list of 136 species in Erythridula, a genus of leafhoppers in the family Cicadellidae.

== Erythridula species ==
- Erythridula abolla (McAtee, 1920)^{c g}
- Erythridula acicularis (Beamer, 1932)^{c g}
- Erythridula acutalis (Ross & DeLong, 1953)^{c g}
- Erythridula aenea (Beamer, 1930)^{c g}
- Erythridula aesculella (Ross & DeLong, 1953)^{c g}
- Erythridula afflicta (Beamer, 1935)^{c g}
- Erythridula albescens (Beamer, 1930)^{c g}
- Erythridula amabilis (McAtee, 1924)^{c g}
- Erythridula ampla (Knull, 1951)^{c g}
- Erythridula angularis (Beamer, 1930)^{c g}
- Erythridula anomala (Knull, 1946)^{c g}
- Erythridula apta (Beamer, 1935)^{c g}
- Erythridula aspera (Beamer & Griffith, 1935)^{c g}
- Erythridula atrimucronata (Beamer, 1930)^{c g}
- Erythridula autenae (Johnson, 1935)^{c g}
- Erythridula barbarae (Hepner, 1978)^{c g}
- Erythridula beckiae (Hepner, 1978)^{c g}
- Erythridula bicornis (Beamer, 1930)^{c g}
- Erythridula bitincta (McAtee, 1926)^{c g b}
- Erythridula brundusa (Robinson, 1924)^{c g b}
- Erythridula canadensis Dmitriev & Dietrich, 2009^{c g}
- Erythridula cauta (Beamer, 1935)^{c g}
- Erythridula celebrata (Johnson, 1935)^{c g}
- Erythridula clavata (DeLong, 1916)^{c g b}
- Erythridula coarctata (Beamer, 1930)^{c g}
- Erythridula complicata (Johnson, 1935)^{c g}
- Erythridula cornipes (Beamer, 1930)^{c g}
- Erythridula cotidiana (Beamer, 1930)^{c g b}
- Erythridula crataegi (Johnson, 1935)^{c g b}
- Erythridula crevecoeuri (Gillette, 1898)^{c g b}
- Erythridula crossi (Hepner, 1976)^{c g}
- Erythridula cruciformis (Beamer, 1930)^{c g}
- Erythridula cuneata (Beamer, 1930)^{c g}
- Erythridula diffisa (Beamer, 1930)^{c g b}
- Erythridula divisa (McAtee, 1924)^{c g b}
- Erythridula dolosa (Beamer & Griffith, 1935)^{c g}
- Erythridula dorsalis ^{b}
- Erythridula dowelli (Beamer, 1932)^{c g}
- Erythridula dunni (Hepner, 1976)^{c g}
- Erythridula electa (McAtee, 1920)^{c g}
- Erythridula eluta (McAtee, 1920)^{c g}
- Erythridula enata (Knull, 1951)^{c g}
- Erythridula falcata (Beamer, 1930)^{c g}
- Erythridula freta (Knull, 1951)^{c g}
- Erythridula frisoni (Ross & DeLong, 1953)^{c g}
- Erythridula fulvocephala (Robinson, 1924)^{c g}
- Erythridula fumida (Gillette, 1898)^{c g b}
- Erythridula funesta (Beamer, 1930)^{c g}
- Erythridula furcillata (Beamer, 1930)^{c g}
- Erythridula gleditsia (Beamer, 1930)^{c g}
- Erythridula hamata (Beamer, 1930)^{c g b}
- Erythridula harpax (Beamer, 1930)^{c g}
- Erythridula haspata (Ross & DeLong, 1953)^{c g}
- Erythridula herberti (Hepner, 1976)^{c g}
- Erythridula idonea (Beamer, 1935)^{c g}
- Erythridula ilicis (Ross, 1953)^{c g}
- Erythridula inconspicua (Johnson, 1935)^{c g}
- Erythridula infinita (Beamer, 1930)^{c g b}
- Erythridula insigna (Beamer & Griffith, 1935)^{c g b}
- Erythridula intricata (Johnson, 1935)^{c g}
- Erythridula jocosa (Beamer, 1935)^{c g}
- Erythridula jonesi (Hepner, 1976)^{c g}
- Erythridula juglandis (Knull & Auten, 1938)^{c g}
- Erythridula juncea (Beamer, 1937)^{c g}
- Erythridula kanza (Robinson, 1924)^{c g b}
- Erythridula lasteri (Hepner, 1977)^{c g}
- Erythridula lawsoniana (Baker, 1926)^{c g}
- Erythridula lemnisca (McAtee, 1926)^{c g}
- Erythridula lloydi (Hepner, 1977)^{c g}
- Erythridula lucileae (Hepner, 1976)^{c g}
- Erythridula lyratae (Ross & DeLong, 1953)^{c g}
- Erythridula magnacalx (Beamer, 1930)^{c g}
- Erythridula malleiformis (Beamer, 1930)^{c g}
- Erythridula mansueta (Beamer, 1935)^{c g}
- Erythridula martini (Hepner, 1976)^{c g}
- Erythridula meridiana (Hepner, 1977)^{c g}
- Erythridula minima (Johnson, 1935)^{c g}
- Erythridula minuta (Johnson, 1935)^{c g b}
- Erythridula modica (Beamer, 1930)^{c g}
- Erythridula morrisi (Hepner, 1977)^{c g}
- Erythridula nava (Beamer, 1935)^{c g}
- Erythridula nigriphylla (Hepner, 1977)^{c g}
- Erythridula nitida (Beamer, 1935)^{c g b}
- Erythridula noeva (Gillette, 1898)^{c g b}
- Erythridula nondescripta (Johnson, 1935)^{c g}
- Erythridula normanti (Hepner, 1976)^{c g}
- Erythridula obliqua (Say, 1825)^{c g}
- Erythridula obvia (Beamer, 1930)^{c g}
- Erythridula occidua (Beamer & Griffith, 1935)^{c g}
- Erythridula ohioensis (Knull, 1945)^{c g b}
- Erythridula parsonsi (Hepner, 1976)^{c g}
- Erythridula parvispicata (Beamer, 1930)^{c g}
- Erythridula penelutea (Beamer, 1930)^{c g}
- Erythridula penenoeva (Beamer, 1930)^{c g b}
- Erythridula penobliqua (Beamer, 1930)^{c g}
- Erythridula perita (Beamer, 1935)^{c g}
- Erythridula pfrimmeri (Hepner, 1977)^{c g b}
- Erythridula planerae Dmitriev & Dietrich, 2009^{c g}
- Erythridula plena (Beamer, 1930)^{c g b}
- Erythridula praecisa (Knull, 1946)^{c g b}
- Erythridula quadrata (Beamer, 1930)^{c g}
- Erythridula repleta (Johnson, 1935)^{c g}
- Erythridula rhododendronae (Hepner, 1978)^{c g}
- Erythridula rubens (Beamer, 1930)^{c g}
- Erythridula rubrataeniensis (Beamer, 1930)^{c g b}
- Erythridula rubroscuta (Gillette, 1898)^{c g}
- Erythridula rubrotincta (Johnson, 1935)^{c g}
- Erythridula rufostigmosa (Beamer, 1930)^{c g b}
- Erythridula rugosae (Ross & DeLong, 1953)^{c g}
- Erythridula sagittata (Beamer, 1930)^{c g}
- Erythridula scissa (Beamer, 1930)^{c g}
- Erythridula scytha (Auten & Johnson, 1936)^{c g}
- Erythridula similalis (Ross & DeLong, 1953)^{c g b}
- Erythridula sincera (Johnson, 1935)^{c g}
- Erythridula sinua (Johnson, 1935)^{c g}
- Erythridula spatulata (Beamer, 1930)^{c}
- Erythridula spearca (Johnson & Auten, 1936)^{c g}
- Erythridula stolata (McAtee, 1920)^{c g b}
- Erythridula stylata (Johnson, 1935)^{c g}
- Erythridula tenebrosa (Knull, 1946)^{c g b}
- Erythridula tenuispica (Beamer, 1930)^{c g}
- Erythridula tolerata (Knull, 1951)^{c g}
- Erythridula torva (Beamer, 1935)^{c g}
- Erythridula tridens (Beamer, 1930)^{c g}
- Erythridula ulmalatae (Ross & DeLong, 1953)^{c g}
- Erythridula ulmosa (Ross & DeLong, 1953)^{c g b}
- Erythridula unicuspidis (Beamer, 1930)^{c g}
- Erythridula varia (McAtee, 1920)^{c g}
- Erythridula verdana (Ross & DeLong, 1953)^{c g b}
- Erythridula victorialis (Knull, 1946)^{c g}
- Erythridula vinaria (Beamer, 1930)^{c g}
- Erythridula volucris (Beamer, 1930)^{c g b}
- Erythridula whitti (Hepner, 1976)^{c g}
- Erythridula wyatti Dmitriev & Dietrich, 2009^{c g}
- Erythridula wysongi (Ross & DeLong, 1953)^{c g}
- Erythridula zephyr (Ross & DeLong, 1953)^{c g}

Data sources: i = ITIS, c = Catalogue of Life, g = GBIF, b = Bugguide.net
