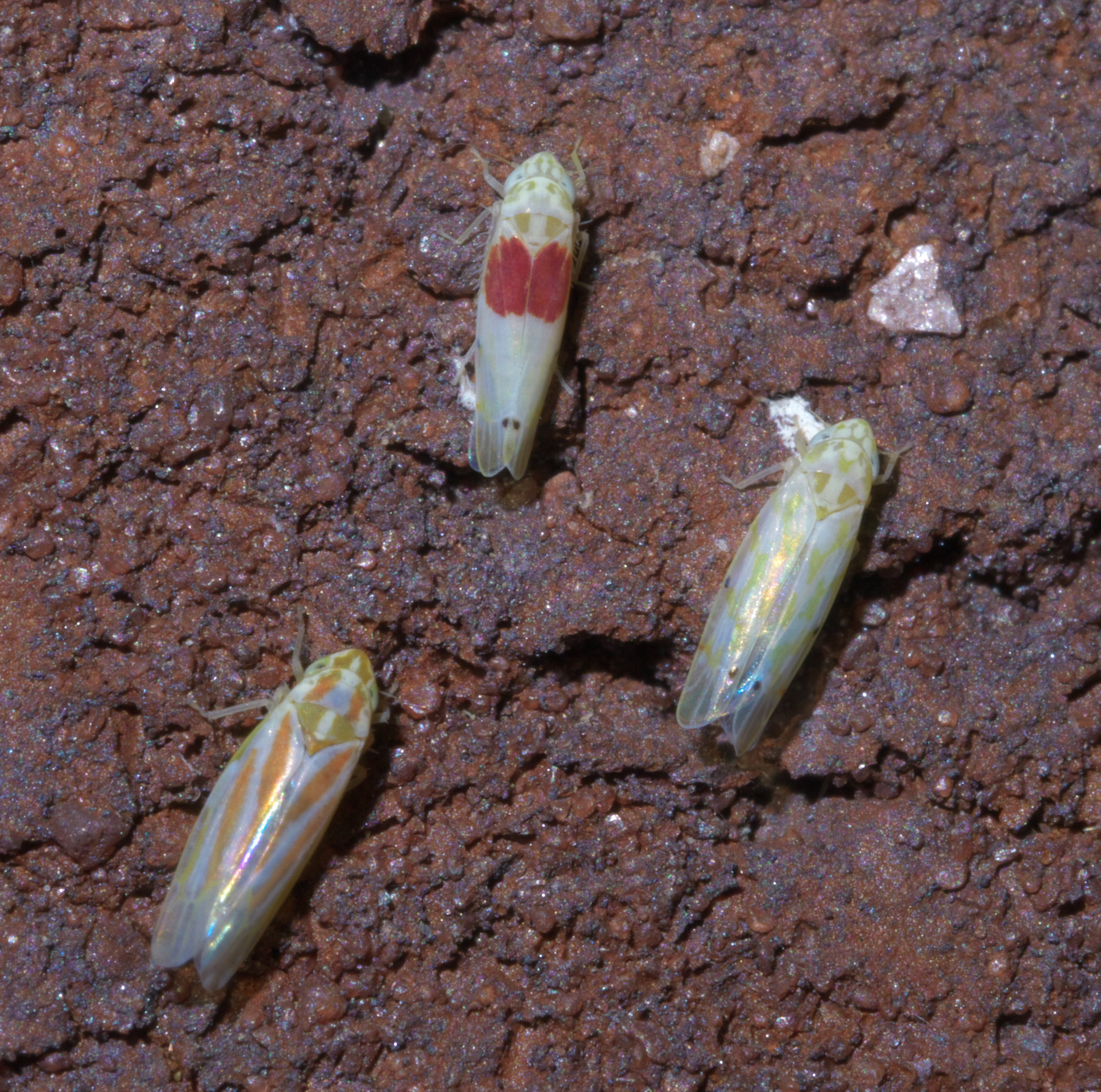
- Eratoneura osborni, top

Scientific classification
- Domain: Eukaryota
- Kingdom: Animalia
- Phylum: Arthropoda
- Class: Insecta
- Order: Hemiptera
- Suborder: Auchenorrhyncha
- Family: Cicadellidae
- Genus: Eratoneura
- Species: E. osborni

Binomial name
- Eratoneura osborni (DeLong, 1916)

= Eratoneura osborni =

Species of true bug

Eratoneura osborni is a species of leafhopper in the family Cicadellidae.
