= Anagrus perforator =

Scientific classification
- Kingdom: Animalia
- Phylum: Arthropoda
- Class: Insecta
- Order: Hymenoptera
- Family: Mymaridae
- Genus: Anagrus
- Species: A. perforator

Binomial name
- Anagrus perforator (Perkins, 1905)

Species of fairyfly

Anagrus perforator is a species of fairyfly.
