= Qadria =

Scientific classification
- Domain: Eukaryota
- Kingdom: Animalia
- Phylum: Arthropoda
- Class: Insecta
- Order: Hemiptera
- Suborder: Auchenorrhyncha
- Family: Cicadellidae
- Tribe: Erythroneurini
- Genus: Qadria; Mahmood, 1967

Genus of true bugs

Qadria is a genus of true bugs belonging to the family Cicadellidae (leafhoppers). Belonging to the Erythroneurini tribe, Qadria consists of fourteen species.

The genus was first described by Mahmood in 1967, and the species are found in Asia.

== Species ==
Species of the genus Qadria are:

- Qadria bannaensis Song & Li, 2014
- Qadria bella Dworakowska, 1981
- Qadria cajanae Ahmed, 1971
- Qadria cucullata Song & Li, 2014
- Qadria daliensis Song & Li, 2014
- Qadria dongfanga Song & Li, 2014
- Qadria erythromaculata Ramakrishnan & Menon, 1973
- Qadria guiyanga Song & Li, 2014
- Qadria pakistanica Ahmed, 1969
- Qadria plamista Dworakowska, 1981
- Qadria planiensis Ramakrishnan & Menon, 1973
- Qadria rubronotata Distant, 1918
- Qadria setosa Ahmed, 1970
- Qadria tandojamensis Ahmed, 1969
