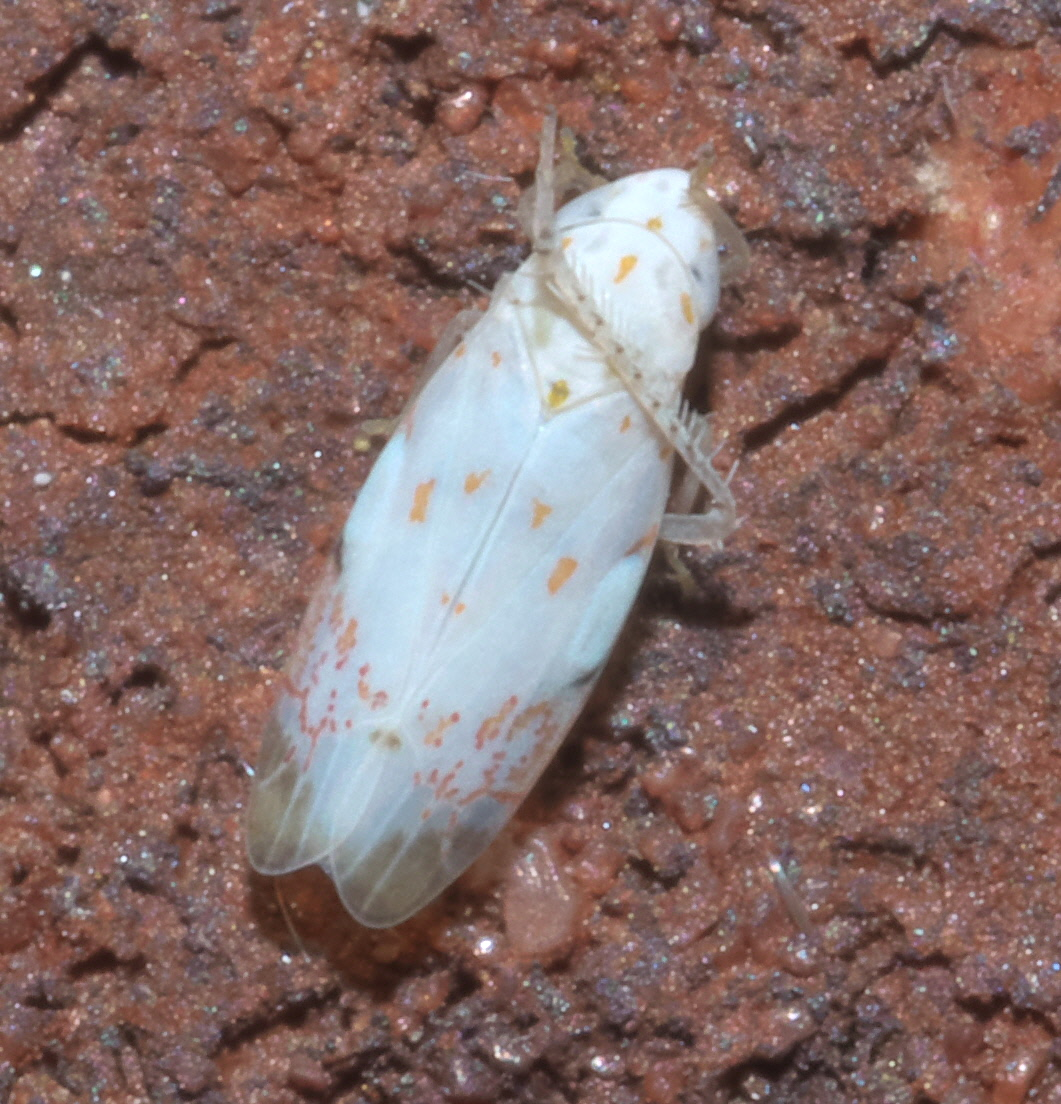

Scientific classification
- Kingdom: Animalia
- Phylum: Arthropoda
- Class: Insecta
- Order: Hemiptera
- Suborder: Auchenorrhyncha
- Family: Cicadellidae
- Genus: Eratoneura
- Species: E. stephensoni

Binomial name
- Eratoneura stephensoni (Beamer, 1931)

Synonyms
- Erythroneura stephensoni Beamer, 1931

= Eratoneura stephensoni =

Species of true bug

Eratoneura stephensoni is a species of leafhopper in the family Cicadellidae. It occurs in the southeastern United States.

It is associated with various Quercus species. Adults measure 2.7–2.9 mm (0.11–0.11 in).

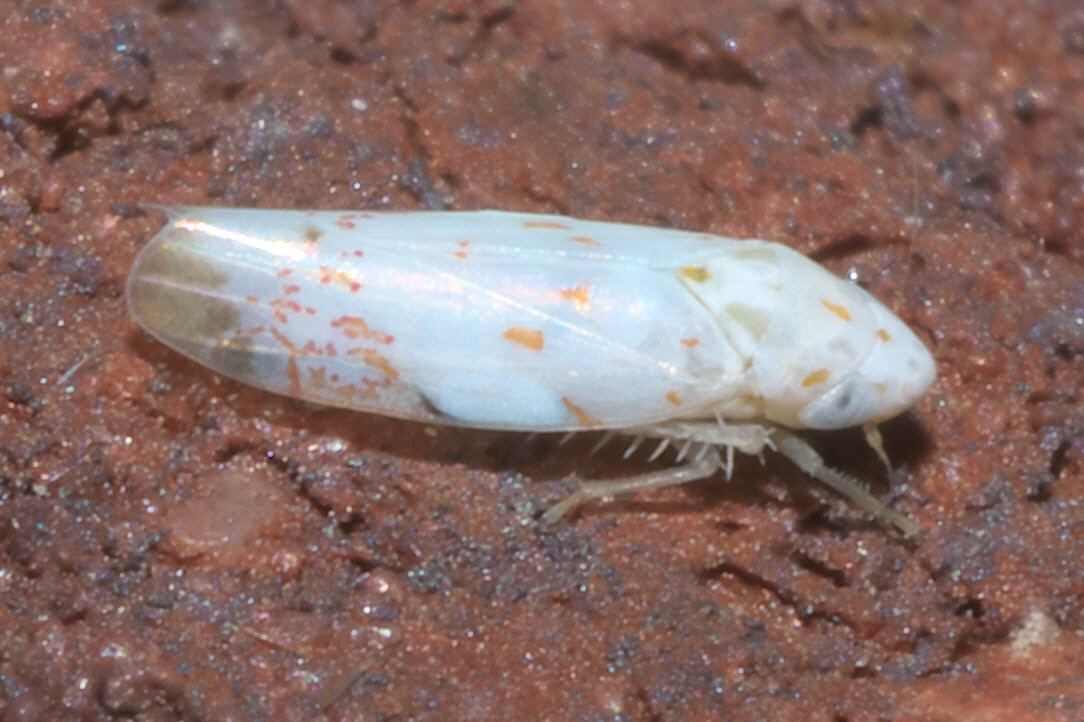
