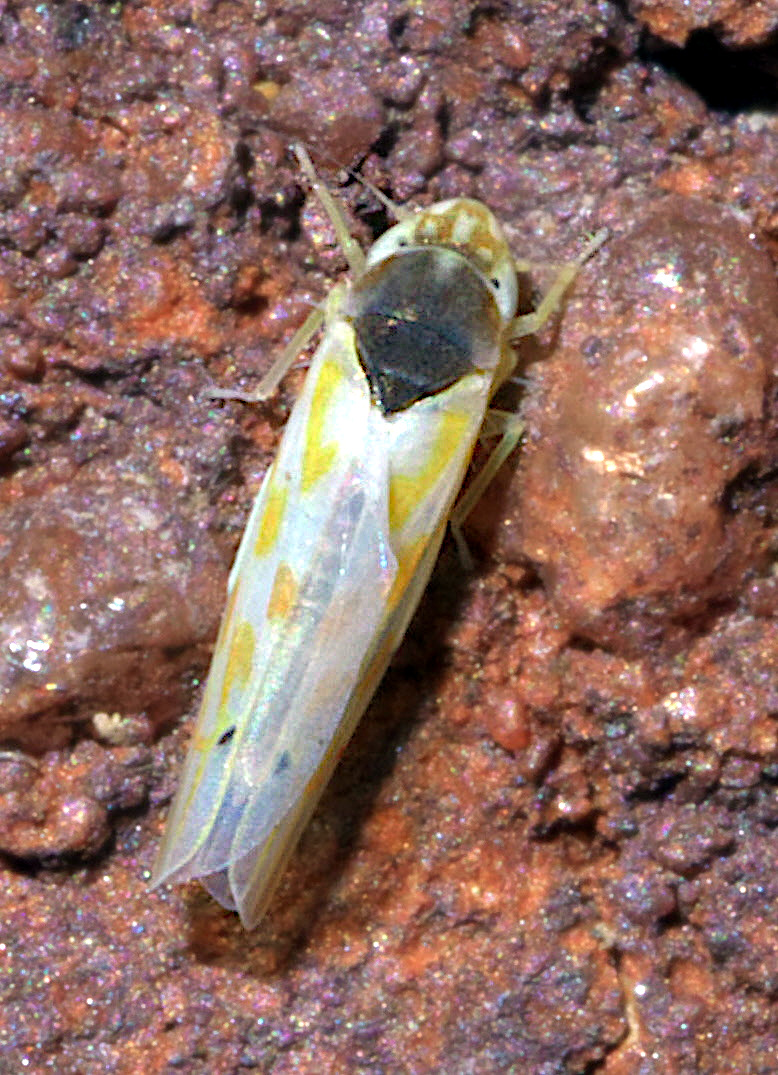

Scientific classification
- Domain: Eukaryota
- Kingdom: Animalia
- Phylum: Arthropoda
- Class: Insecta
- Order: Hemiptera
- Suborder: Auchenorrhyncha
- Family: Cicadellidae
- Genus: Eratoneura
- Species: E. ardens

Binomial name
- Eratoneura ardens (McAtee, 1920)

= Eratoneura ardens =

Species of true bug

Eratoneura ardens is a species of leafhopper in the family Cicadellidae.

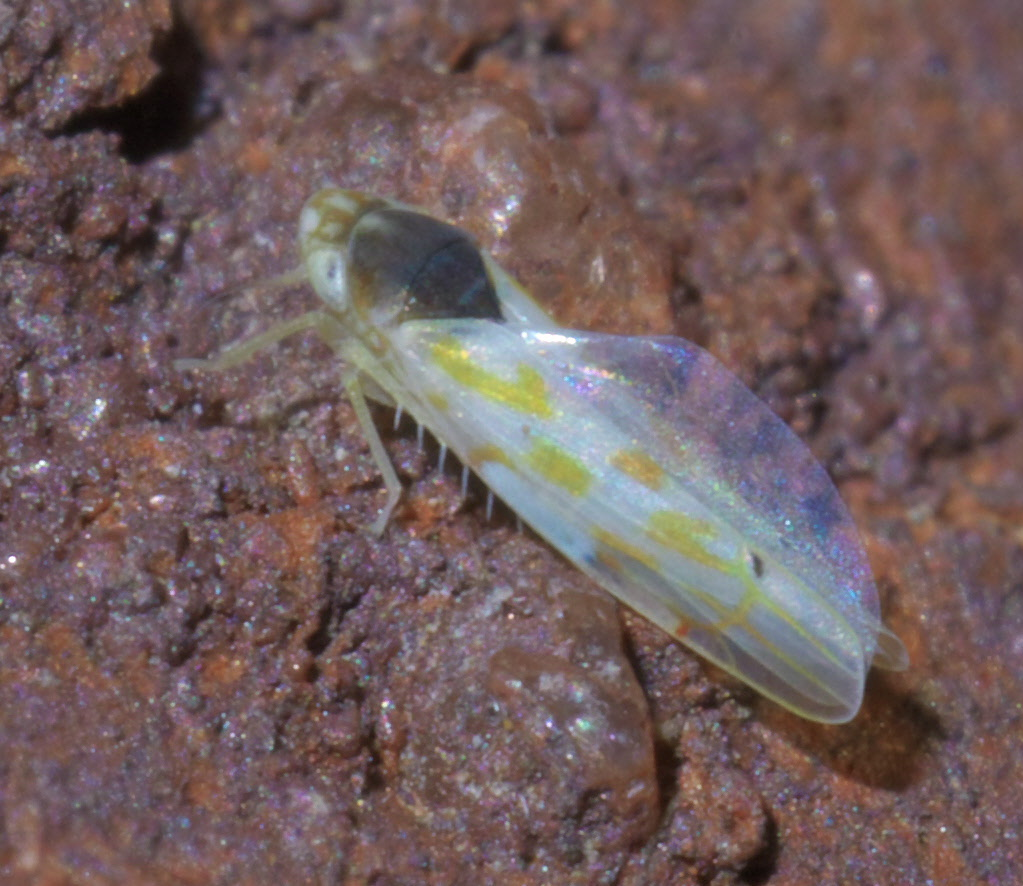
