= Anagrus epos =

Scientific classification
- Kingdom: Animalia
- Phylum: Arthropoda
- Class: Insecta
- Order: Hymenoptera
- Family: Mymaridae
- Genus: Anagrus
- Species: A. epos

Binomial name
- Anagrus epos Girault, 1911

Species of wasp

Anagrus epos is a species of fairyfly which has been proposed as a biological control agent against Homalodisca vitripennis.
