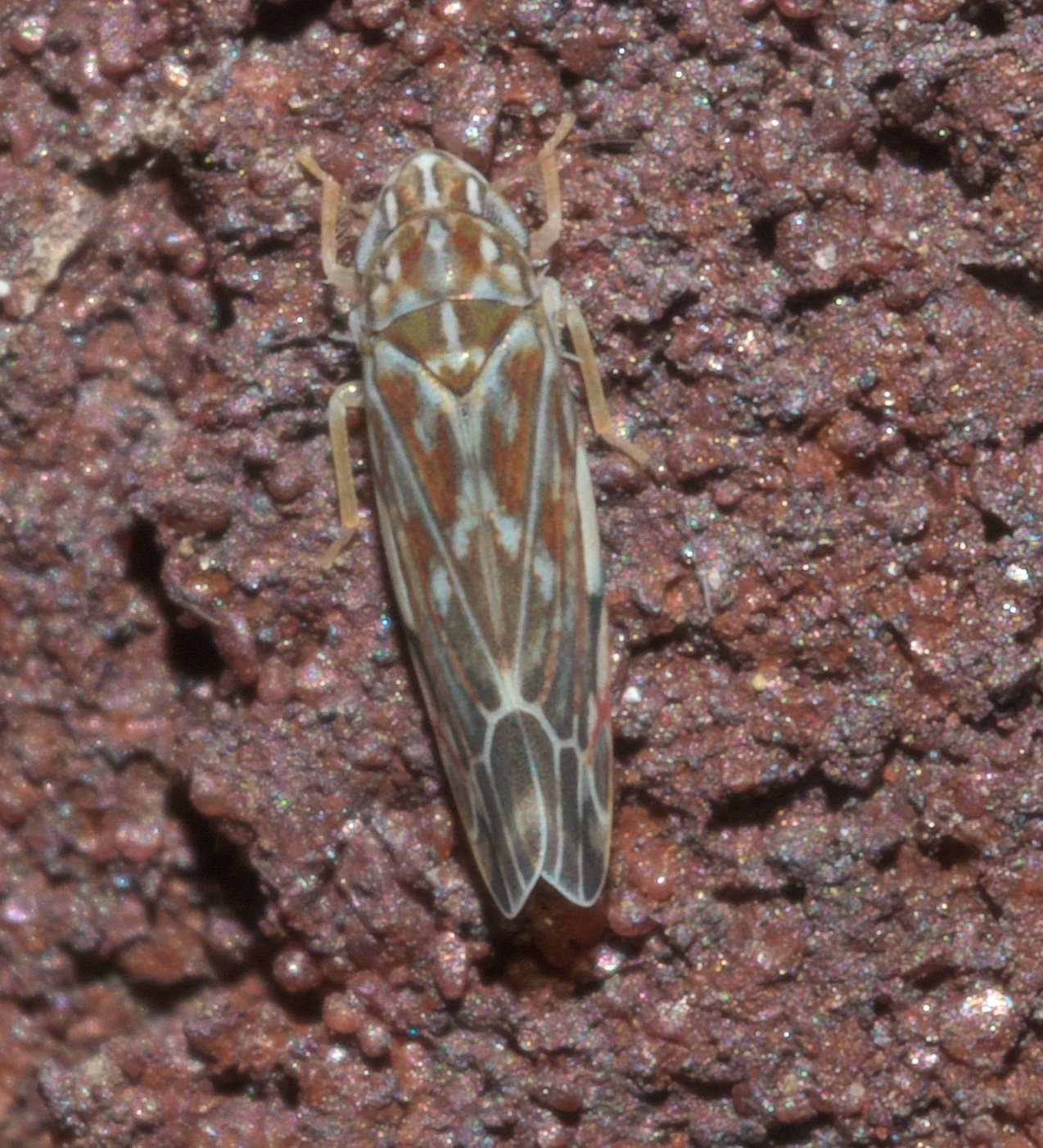
- Erasmoneura vulnerata, Oklahoma

Scientific classification
- Kingdom: Animalia
- Phylum: Arthropoda
- Clade: Pancrustacea
- Class: Insecta
- Order: Hemiptera
- Suborder: Auchenorrhyncha
- Family: Cicadellidae
- Subfamily: Typhlocybinae
- Tribe: Erythroneurini
- Genus: Erasmoneura; Young, 1952

= Erasmoneura =

Genus of insects

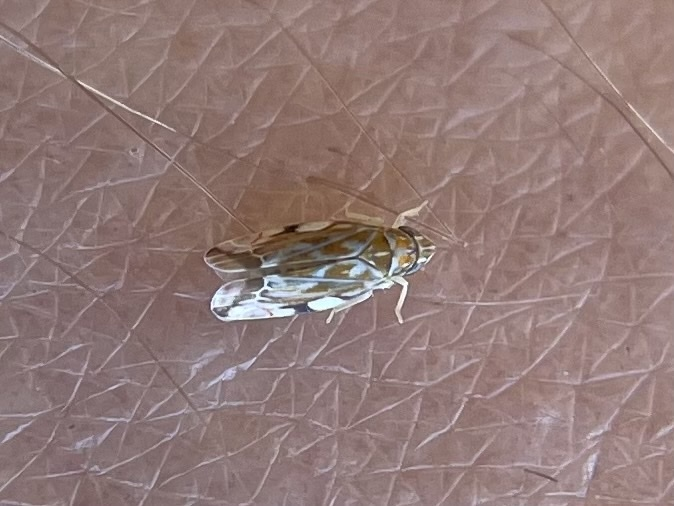
Erasmoneura variabilis, California

Erasmoneura is a genus of leafhoppers in the family Cicadellidae. There are about 14 described species in Erasmoneura, found in North America. The species Erasmoneura vulnerata is found in southern Europe as well as North America.

== Species ==
These 14 species belong to the genus Erasmoneura:

- Erasmoneura atra (Johnson, 1935)
- Erasmoneura bipentagona (Beamer, 1927)
- Erasmoneura caerula (Beamer, 1937)
- Erasmoneura emeljanovi Dmitriev & Dietrich, 2007
- Erasmoneura fulmina (McAtee, 1920)
- Erasmoneura latiloba Dmitriev, 2008
- Erasmoneura margaritae Dmitriev & Dietrich, 2007
- Erasmoneura mixta (Beamer, 1932)
- Erasmoneura nigerrima (McAtee, 1920)
- Erasmoneura nigra (Gillette, 1898)
- Erasmoneura rubricata (Van Duzee, 1909)
- Erasmoneura tricuspidata Dmitriev & Zahniser, 2017
- Erasmoneura variabilis (Beamer, 1929) (variegated leafhopper)
- Erasmoneura vulnerata (Fitch, 1851) (wounded leafhopper)
