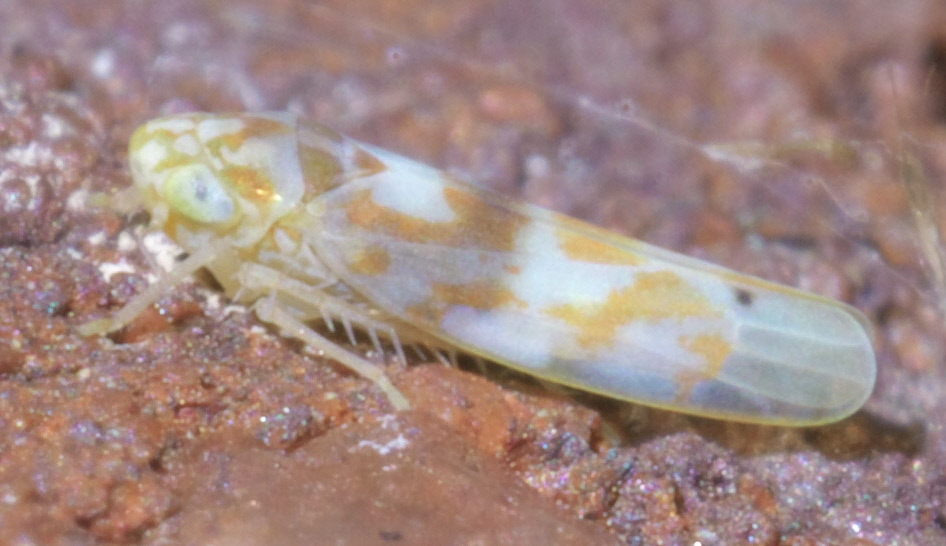
- Eratoneura affinis

Scientific classification
- Domain: Eukaryota
- Kingdom: Animalia
- Phylum: Arthropoda
- Class: Insecta
- Order: Hemiptera
- Suborder: Auchenorrhyncha
- Family: Cicadellidae
- Genus: Eratoneura
- Species: E. affinis

Binomial name
- Eratoneura affinis (Fitch, 1851)

= Eratoneura affinis =

Species of true bug

Eratoneura affinis is a species of leafhopper in the family Cicadellidae.
