= Anagrus frequens =

Scientific classification
- Kingdom: Animalia
- Phylum: Arthropoda
- Class: Insecta
- Order: Hymenoptera
- Family: Mymaridae
- Genus: Anagrus
- Species: A. frequens

Binomial name
- Anagrus frequens Perkins, 1905

Synonyms
- Anagrus toyae Pang & Wang, 1985; Anagrus cicadulinae Ferrière, 1930; Anagrus armatus australiensis Girault, 1912; Anagrus (Anagrus) frequens Perkins, 1905

Species of fairyfly

Anagrus frequens is a species of fairyfly in the Mymaridae family in the order Hymenoptera. These tiny wasps are parasitoids that help control insect pest populations. They are found in Europe, Asia, and North America.

They are very small, usually 1–2 mm (0.04–0.08 in) long. They target eggs of leafhoppers and planthoppers and help maintain ecosystem balance.
