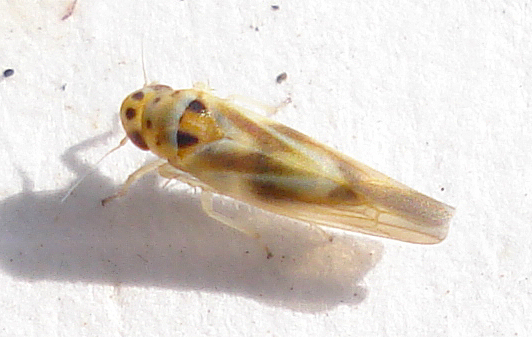
- Arboridia ribauti

Scientific classification
- Domain: Eukaryota
- Kingdom: Animalia
- Phylum: Arthropoda
- Class: Insecta
- Order: Hemiptera
- Suborder: Auchenorrhyncha
- Family: Cicadellidae
- Subfamily: Typhlocybinae
- Tribe: Erythroneurini
- Genus: Arboridia; Zachvatkin, 1946

= Arboridia =

Genus of true bugs

Arboridia is a genus of true bugs belonging to the family Cicadellidae.

The genus was first described by Zachvatkin in 1946.

The species of this genus are found in Europe and Northern America.

Species:

- Arboridia adanae (Dlabola, 1957)
- Arboridia kermanshah (Dlabola, 1963)
- Arboridia parvula (Boheman, 1845)
