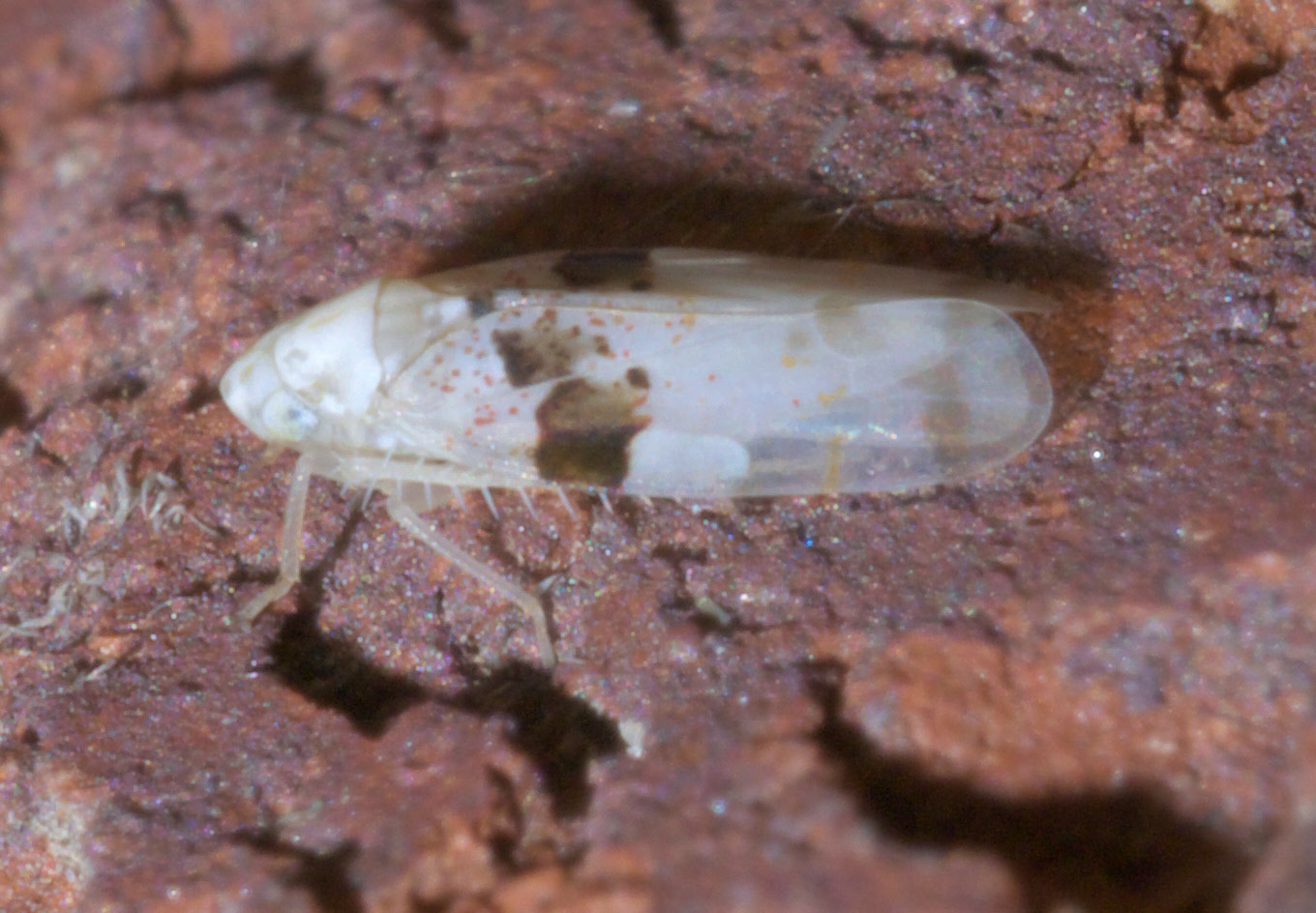
- Hymetta anthisma

Scientific classification
- Kingdom: Animalia
- Phylum: Arthropoda
- Clade: Pancrustacea
- Class: Insecta
- Order: Hemiptera
- Suborder: Auchenorrhyncha
- Family: Cicadellidae
- Subfamily: Typhlocybinae
- Tribe: Erythroneurini
- Genus: Hymetta; McAtee, 1919

= Hymetta =

Genus of insects

Hymetta is a genus of typical leafhoppers in the family Cicadellidae. There are about five described species in Hymetta, found in North America.

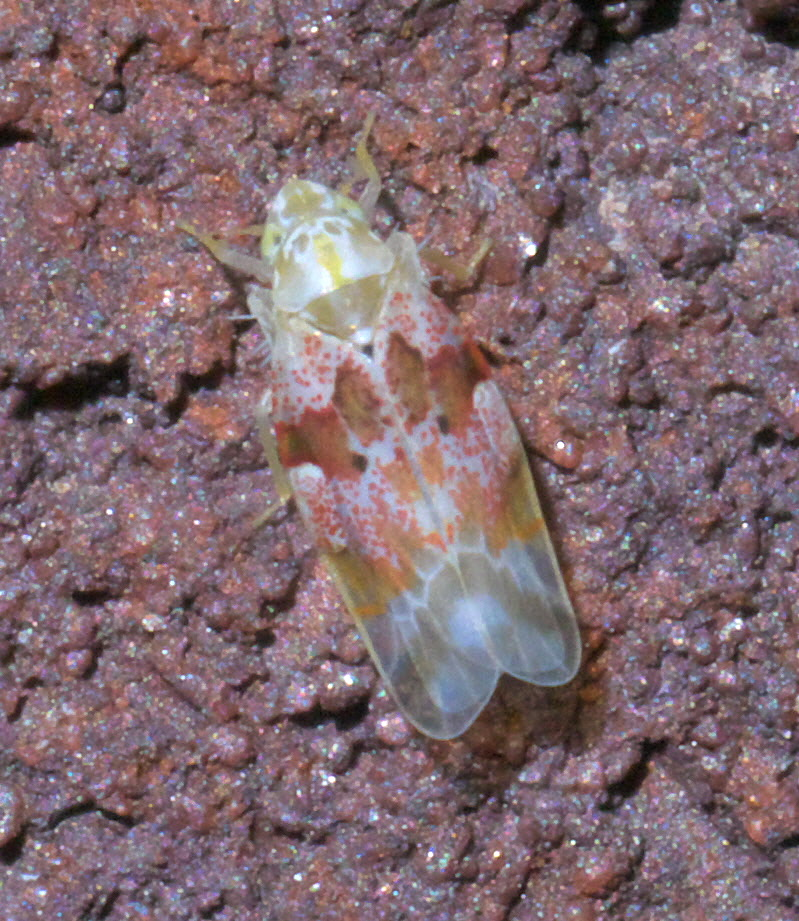
Hymetta balteata

== Species ==
These five species belong to the genus Hymetta:

- Hymetta anthisma McAtee, 1919
- Hymetta arizoniana Fairbairn, 1928
- Hymetta balteata McAtee, 1919
- Hymetta kansasensis Fairbairn, 1928
- Hymetta trifasciata (Say, 1825)
