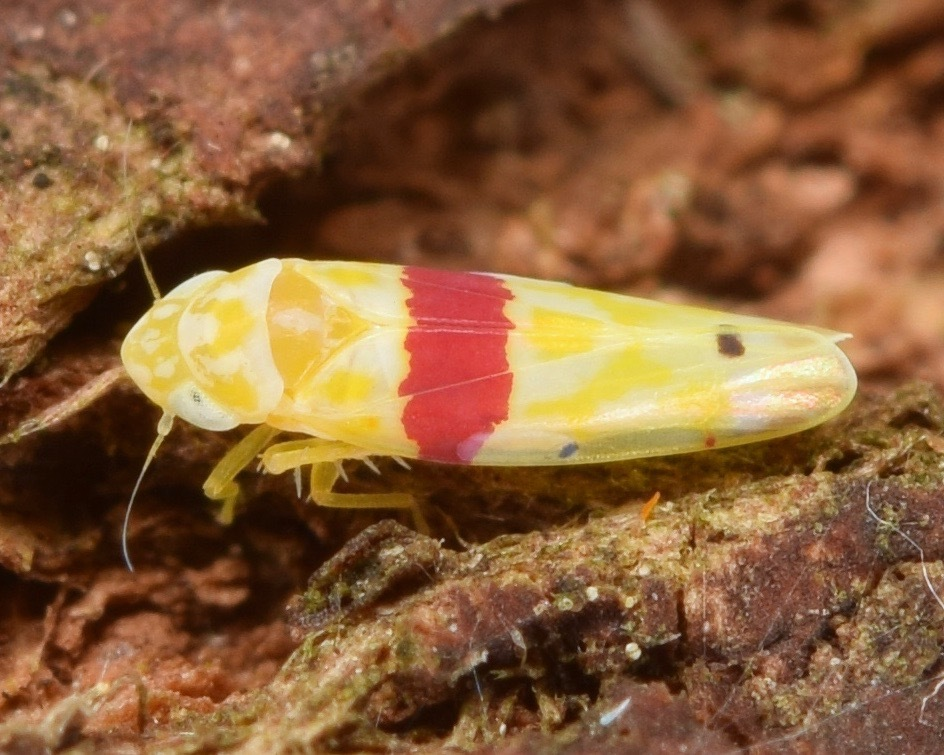

Scientific classification
- Domain: Eukaryota
- Kingdom: Animalia
- Phylum: Arthropoda
- Class: Insecta
- Order: Hemiptera
- Suborder: Auchenorrhyncha
- Family: Cicadellidae
- Genus: Eratoneura
- Species: E. era

Binomial name
- Eratoneura era (McAtee, 1920)

Synonyms
- Erythroneura era McAtee, 1920

= Eratoneura era =

Species of true bug

Eratoneura era is a species of leafhopper in the family Cicadellidae. It is found in the eastern United States.
