= Anagrus armatus =

Scientific classification
- Domain: Eukaryota
- Kingdom: Animalia
- Phylum: Arthropoda
- Class: Insecta
- Order: Hymenoptera
- Family: Mymaridae
- Genus: Anagrus
- Species: A. armatus

Binomial name
- Anagrus armatus Ashmead, 1887

Species of wasp

Anagrus armatus is a species of fairyfly. It has been found in Florida and Puerto Rico.
