= Eratoneura solita =

Scientific classification
- Domain: Eukaryota
- Kingdom: Animalia
- Phylum: Arthropoda
- Class: Insecta
- Order: Hemiptera
- Suborder: Auchenorrhyncha
- Family: Cicadellidae
- Genus: Eratoneura
- Species: E. solita

Binomial name
- Eratoneura solita (Beamer, 1932)

Species of true bug

Eratoneura solita is a species of leafhopper in the family Cicadellidae.
