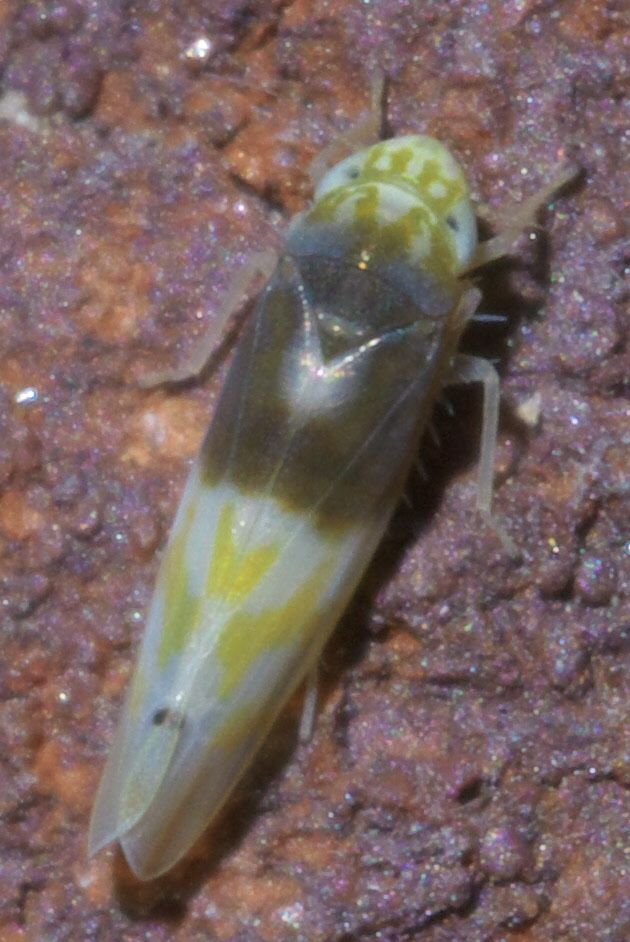

Scientific classification
- Domain: Eukaryota
- Kingdom: Animalia
- Phylum: Arthropoda
- Class: Insecta
- Order: Hemiptera
- Suborder: Auchenorrhyncha
- Family: Cicadellidae
- Genus: Eratoneura
- Species: E. basilaris

Binomial name
- Eratoneura basilaris (Say, 1825)

= Eratoneura basilaris =

Species of true bug

Eratoneura basilaris is a species of leafhopper in the family Cicadellidae.

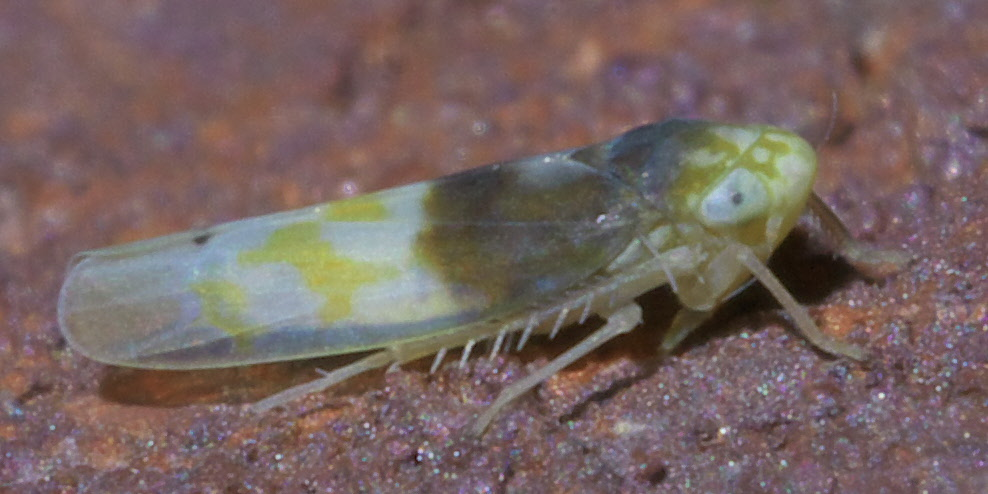
