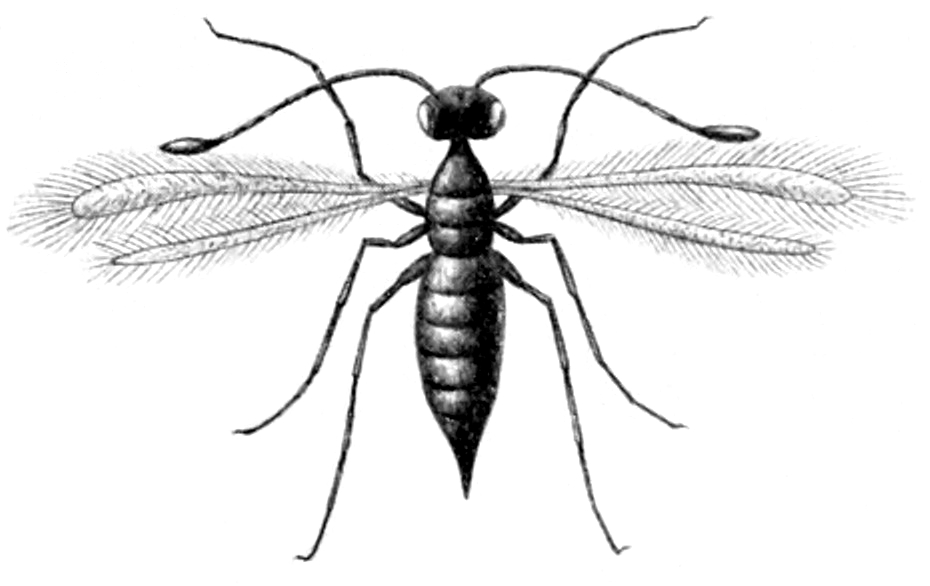
- Anagrus subfuscus

Scientific classification
- Kingdom: Animalia
- Phylum: Arthropoda
- Class: Insecta
- Order: Hymenoptera
- Family: Mymaridae
- Genus: Anagrus; Haliday, 1833

Species
- >80 species

Synonyms
- Anagrella Bakkendorf, 1962; Packardiella Ashmead, 1904; Paranagrus Perkins, 1905; Pteratimus Packard, 1864; Pteratomus Packard, 1864

= Anagrus =

Genus of wasps

Anagrus is a genus of fairyflies, in the family Mymaridae, comprising over 90 species, a number of which are employed as biocontrol agents. They come in a wide array of colors such as, brown, orange, black and pale. For classificatory purposes, the genus is divided into three subgenera Anagrella, Anagrus and Paranagrus. The adults lay eggs on the host, mainly Hemiptera, with a few using Odonata as hosts.

== Species ==
Species accepted as of May 2025:

- Anagrus aegyptiacus Soyka, 1950
- Anagrus arboridiae Triapitsyn & Adachi-Hagimori, 2020
- Anagrus armatus (Ashmead, 1887)
- Anagrus atomus (Linnaeus, 1767)
- Anagrus avalae Soyka, 1956
- Anagrus baeri Girault, 1912
- Anagrus bakkendorfi Soyka, 1946
- Anagrus brasiliensis Triapitsyn, 1997
- Anagrus brevifuniculatus Viggiani & Jesu, 1995
- Anagrus breviphragma Soyka, 1956
- Anagrus brocheri Schulz, 1910
- Anagrus capensis Hedqvist, 1960
- Anagrus columbi Perkins, 1905
- Anagrus daanei Triapitsyn, 1998
- Anagrus dalhousieanus Mani & Saraswat, 1973
- Anagrus delicatus Dozier, 1936
- Anagrus dilatatus Soyka, 1956
- Anagrus dmitrievi Triapitsyn & Hu, 2018
- Anagrus elegans Chiappini, 2002
- Anagrus elongatus (Risbec, 1950)
- Anagrus empoascae Dozier, 1932
- Anagrus ensifer Debauche, 1948
- Anagrus epos Girault, 1911
- Anagrus erythroneurae S.Trjapitzin & Chiappini, 1994
- Anagrus fennicus Soyka, 1956
- Anagrus fisheri Donev, 1998
- Anagrus flaveolus Waterhouse, 1913
- Anagrus flaviapex Chiappini & Lin, 1998
- Anagrus foersteri (Ratzeburg, 1848)
- Anagrus frequens Perkins, 1905
- Anagrus funebris Mathot, 1968
- Anagrus gonzalezae Triapitsyn, 1997
- Anagrus hirashimai Sahad, 1982
- Anagrus humicola Mathot, 1968
- Anagrus incarnatus Haliday, 1833
- Anagrus insularis Dozier, 1936
- Anagrus iti Triapitsyn, 2013
- Anagrus japonicus Sahad, 1982
- Anagrus lindberginae Nugnes & Viggiani, 2014
- Anagrus lineolus Triapitsyn, 2000
- Anagrus longitibialis Donev, 1996
- Anagrus mockfordi Triapitsyn, 2000
- Anagrus mymaricornis (Bakkendorf, 1962)
- Anagrus naulti Triapitsyn & Moya-Raygoza
- Anagrus nedotepae Triapitsyn
- Anagrus nigriceps (Smits van Burgst, 1914)
- Anagrus nigrienentris Girault, 1911
- Anagrus nigriventris Girault, 1911
- Anagrus nilaparvatae Pang & Wang, 1985
- Anagrus oahuensis Triapitsyn & Beardsley
- Anagrus obscurus Förster, 1861
- Anagrus obvius Soyka, 1956
- Anagrus optabilis (Perkins, 1905)
- Anagrus perforator (Perkins, 1905)
- Anagrus proscassellatii Viggiani & Jesu, 1995
- Anagrus prounilinearis Viggiani & Jesu, 1995
- Anagrus puella Girault, 1911
- Anagrus putnamii (Packard, 1864)
- Anagrus raygilli Triapitsyn, 2000
- Anagrus rilensis Donev, 1996
- Anagrus rugmanjonesi Triapitsyn & Adachi-Hagimori, 2019
- Anagrus scassellatii Paoli, 1930
- Anagrus sensillatus Viggiani & Jesu, 1995
- Anagrus setosus Chiappini & Lin, 1998
- Anagrus similis Soyka, 1956
- Anagrus sophiae Trjapitzin, 1995
- Anagrus spiritus Girault, 1911
- Anagrus stethynioides Triapitsyn, 2002
- Anagrus subfuscus Forster, 1847
- Anagrus supremosimilis Soyka, 1956
- Anagrus takeyanus Gordh, 1977
- Anagrus tretiakovae Triapitsyn, 1998
- Anagrus turpanicus Triapitsyn & Hu
- Anagrus unilinearis Soyka, 1950
- Anagrus urichi Pickles, 1932
- Anagrus ustulatus Haliday, 1833
- Anagrus vilis Donev, 1989
- Anagrus virginiae S.Triapitsyn & Puttler, 2006
- Anagrus virlai Triapitsyn, Rugman-Jones, Tretiakov, Luft Albarracin, Moya-Raygoza & Querino, 2018
