= Zyginopsis =

Scientific classification
- Domain: Eukaryota
- Kingdom: Animalia
- Phylum: Arthropoda
- Class: Insecta
- Order: Hemiptera
- Suborder: Auchenorrhyncha
- Family: Cicadellidae
- Tribe: Erythroneurini
- Genus: Zyginopsis; Ramakrishnan & Menon, 1973

Genus of true bugs

Zyginopsis is a genus of true bugs belonging to the family Cicadellidae (leafhoppers). The genus was first described by Ramakrishnan & Menon in 1973.

== Species ==
Species of the genus Zyginopsis include:

- Zyginopsis horizontalis Dworakowska, 1981
- Zyginopsis major Dworakowska, 1981
- Zyginopsis verticalis Ahmed, 1970

== See also ==
- List of hemipterans of Sri Lanka
