= Anagrus incarnatus =

Scientific classification
- Domain: Eukaryota
- Kingdom: Animalia
- Phylum: Arthropoda
- Class: Insecta
- Order: Hymenoptera
- Family: Mymaridae
- Genus: Anagrus
- Species: A. incarnatus

Binomial name
- Anagrus incarnatus Haliday, 1833

Species of wasp

Anagrus incarnatus is a species of fairyfly. It is an egg parasitoid of Cicadella viridis, several genera and species of Delphacidae (Hemiptera), and also Orthotylus virescens. It's native to the Palearctic.
