= Erythridula stolata =

Scientific classification
- Kingdom: Animalia
- Phylum: Arthropoda
- Clade: Pancrustacea
- Class: Insecta
- Order: Hemiptera
- Suborder: Auchenorrhyncha
- Family: Cicadellidae
- Genus: Erythridula
- Species: E. stolata

Binomial name
- Erythridula stolata (McAtee, 1920)

Species of true bug

Erythridula stolata is a species of leafhopper in the family Cicadellidae.
