= Arboridia kermanshah =

Scientific classification
- Kingdom: Animalia
- Phylum: Arthropoda
- Clade: Pancrustacea
- Class: Insecta
- Order: Hemiptera
- Suborder: Auchenorrhyncha
- Family: Cicadellidae
- Genus: Arboridia
- Species: A. kermanshah

Binomial name
- Arboridia kermanshah (Dlabola, 1963)

Species of leafhopper

Arboridia kermanshah, the grape leafhopper, is a species of leafhopper distributed in West Asia (Iraq, Iran). It is a vineyard pest species.
