= Zinga (leafhopper) =

Scientific classification
- Kingdom: Animalia
- Phylum: Arthropoda
- Class: Insecta
- Order: Hemiptera
- Suborder: Auchenorrhyncha
- Family: Cicadellidae
- Genus: Zinga; Dworakowska, 1972

Genus of true bugs

Zinga is a genus of leafhoppers in the family Cicadellidae. There are at least two described species in Zinga.

== Species ==
These two species belong to the genus Zinga:

- Zinga mayensis Dworakowska, 2011^{c g}
- Zinga novembris Dworakowska, 1972^{c g}

Data sources: i = ITIS, c = Catalogue of Life, g = GBIF, b = Bugguide.net
