= Aaka =

Scientific classification
- Domain: Eukaryota
- Kingdom: Animalia
- Phylum: Arthropoda
- Class: Insecta
- Order: Hemiptera
- Suborder: Auchenorrhyncha
- Family: Cicadellidae
- Genus: Aaka; Dworakowska, 1972
- Species: A. coera

Binomial name
- Aaka coera Dworakowska, 1972

Genus of true bugs

Aaka is a genus of hemiptera in the leafhopper family. There is only one species described in this genus, known as Aaka coera. It is distributed in Papua New Guinea.
