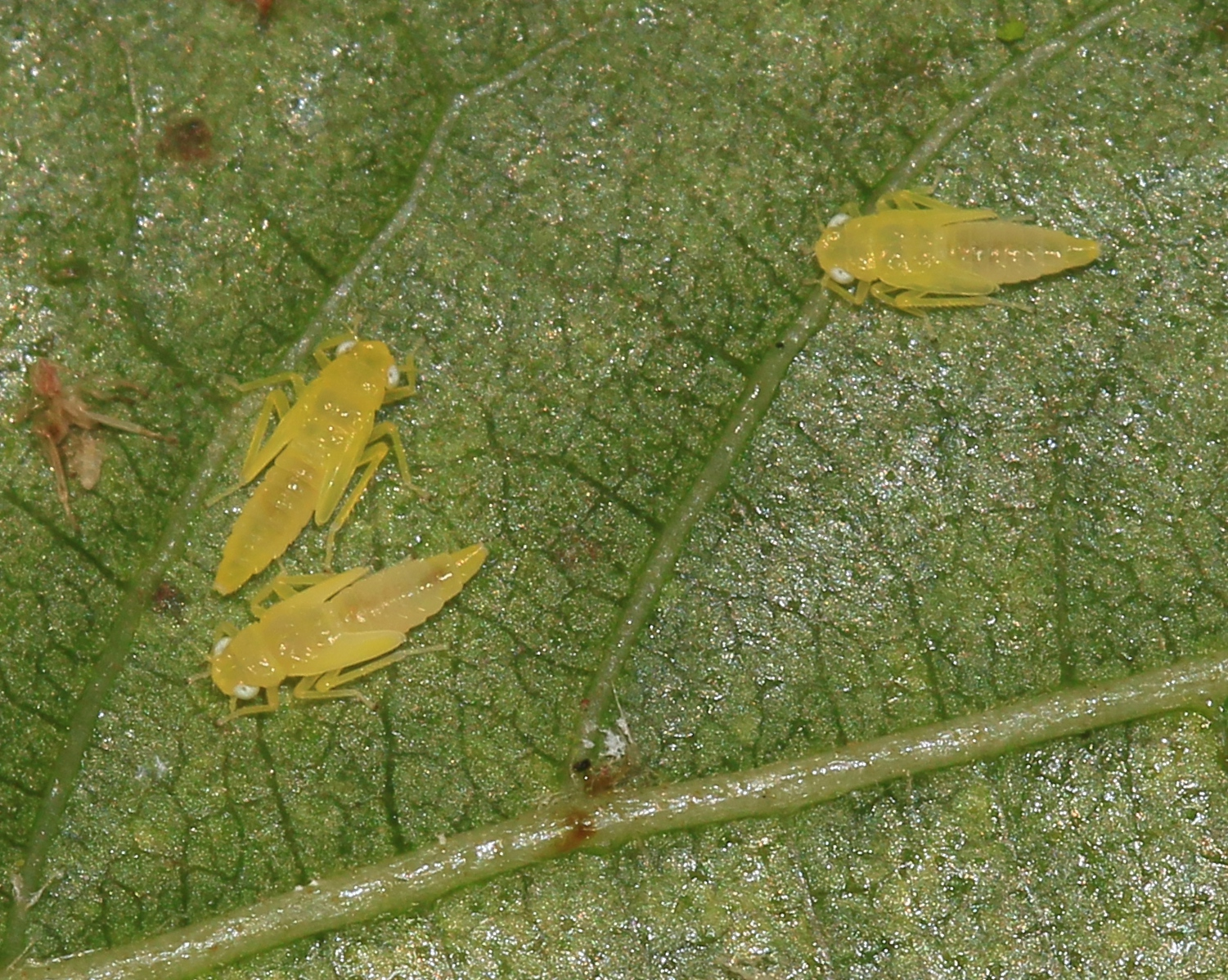
- Alnetoida (leafhopper nymphs) on alder leaf

Scientific classification
- Domain: Eukaryota
- Kingdom: Animalia
- Phylum: Arthropoda
- Class: Insecta
- Order: Hemiptera
- Suborder: Auchenorrhyncha
- Family: Cicadellidae
- Genus: Alnetoidia (Dahlbom, 1850)

= Alnetoidia =

Genus of insects

Alnetoidia is a genus of true bugs belonging to the family Cicadellidae.

The species of this genus are found in Europe and Japan.

Species:

- Alnetoidia alneti (Dahlbom, 1850)
- Alnetoidia awla Song, 2010
