= Zyginidia =

Scientific classification
- Domain: Eukaryota
- Kingdom: Animalia
- Phylum: Arthropoda
- Class: Insecta
- Order: Hemiptera
- Suborder: Auchenorrhyncha
- Family: Cicadellidae
- Genus: Zyginidia; Haupt, 1929

Genus of true bugs

Zyginidia is a genus of true bugs belonging to the family Cicadellidae.

The species of this genus are found in Europe.

Species:

- Zyginidia adamczewskii Dworakowska, 1970
- Zyginidia alexandrina (Linnavuori, 1964)
