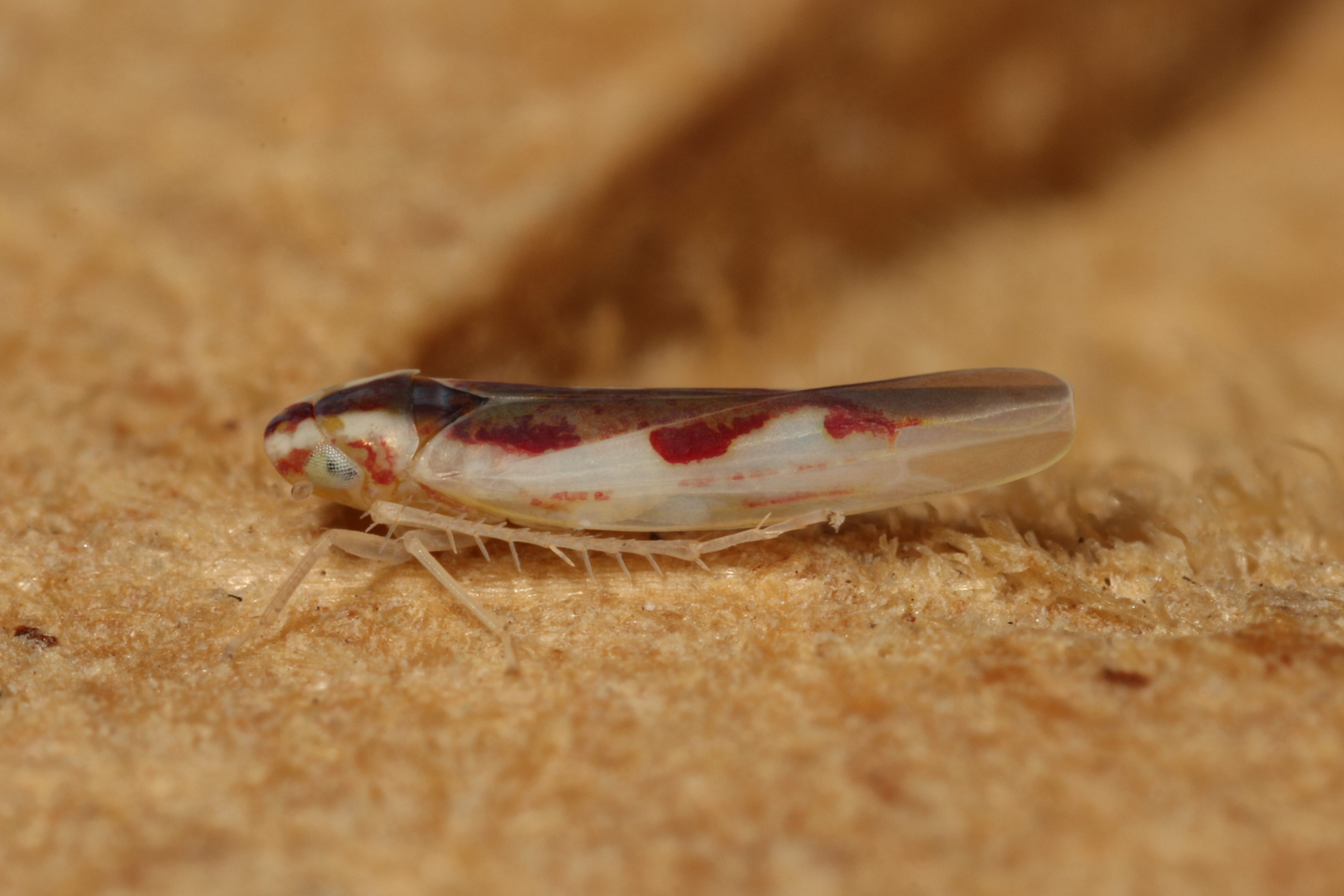
- Zygina angusta

Scientific classification
- Kingdom: Animalia
- Phylum: Arthropoda
- Class: Insecta
- Order: Hemiptera
- Suborder: Auchenorrhyncha
- Family: Cicadellidae
- Subfamily: Typhlocybinae
- Tribe: Erythroneurini
- Genus: Zygina; Fieber, 1866

= Zygina =

Genus of true bugs

Zygina is a genus of leafhoppers, belonging to the family Cicadellidae.

The genus was described in 1866 by Franz Xaver Fieber.

The genus has cosmopolitan distribution.

Species:

- Zygina hyperici
- Zygina ordinaria
- Zygina nivea
- Zygina rhamni
- Zygina rosea
- Zygina rubrovittata
- Zygina suavis
- Zygina tiliae
