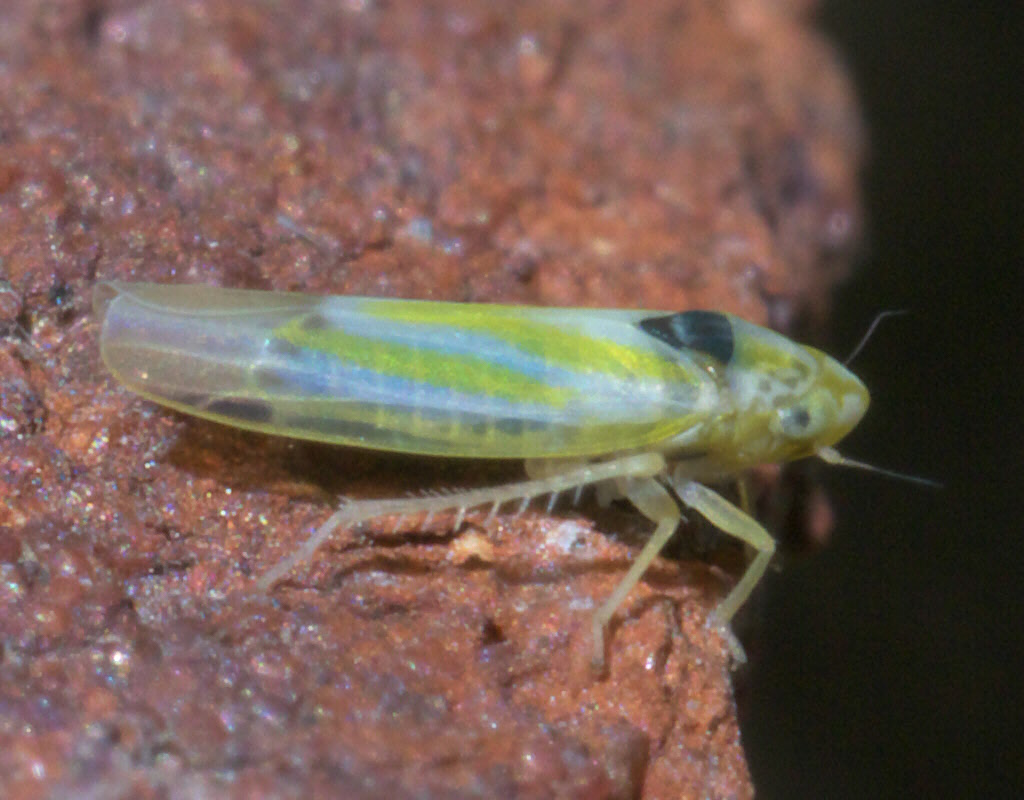

Scientific classification
- Domain: Eukaryota
- Kingdom: Animalia
- Phylum: Arthropoda
- Class: Insecta
- Order: Hemiptera
- Suborder: Auchenorrhyncha
- Family: Cicadellidae
- Tribe: Erythroneurini
- Genus: Erythridula; Young, 1952

= Erythridula =

Genus of leafhoppers

Erythridula is a genus of leafhoppers in the family Cicadellidae. There are at least 130 described species in Erythridula.

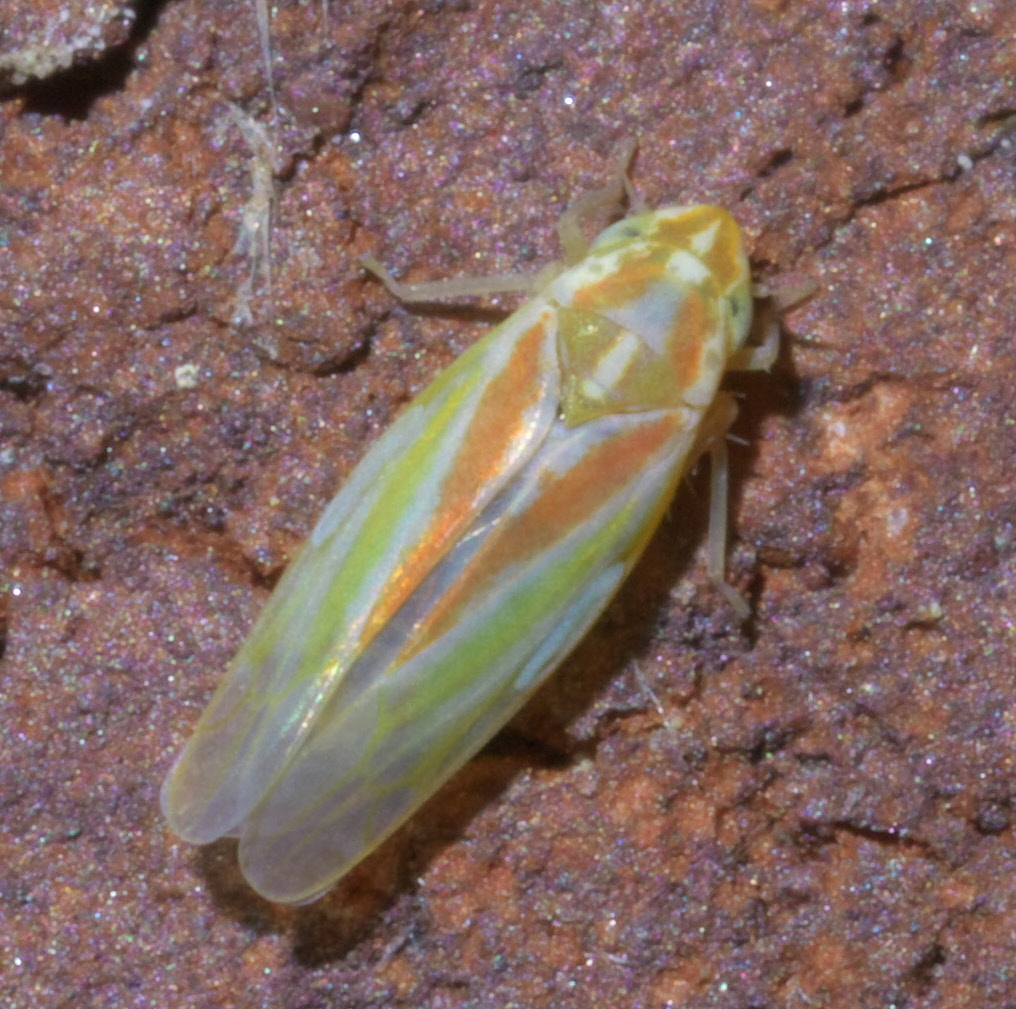

== See also ==
- List of Erythridula species
