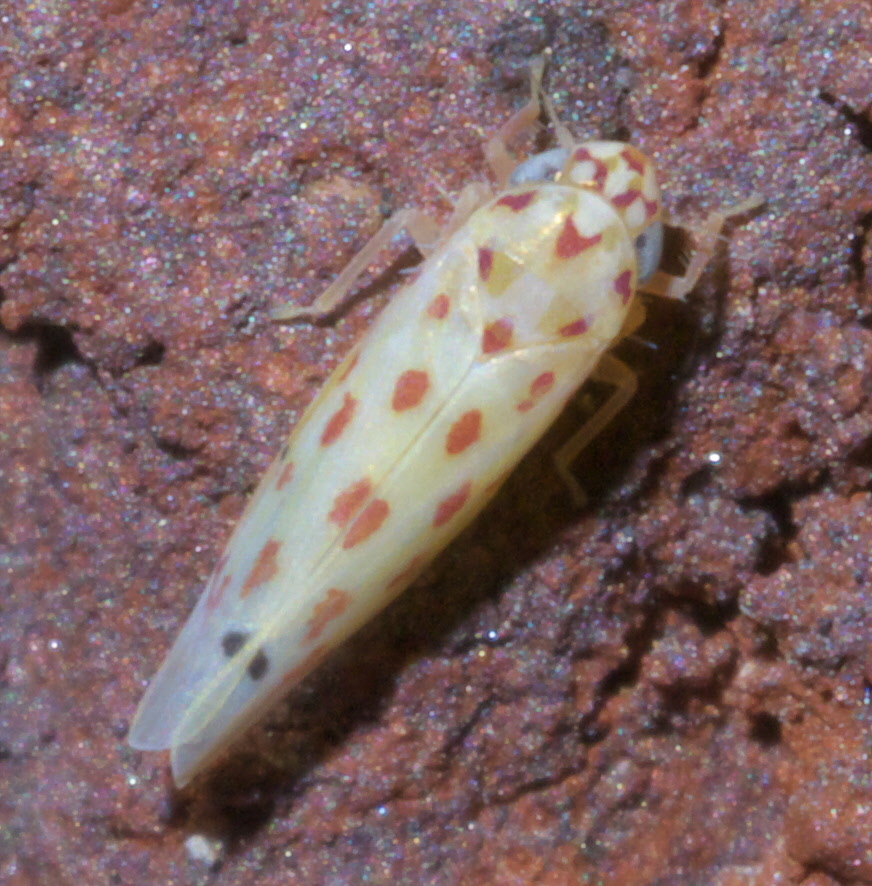

Scientific classification
- Domain: Eukaryota
- Kingdom: Animalia
- Phylum: Arthropoda
- Class: Insecta
- Order: Hemiptera
- Suborder: Auchenorrhyncha
- Family: Cicadellidae
- Tribe: Erythroneurini
- Genus: Eratoneura; Young, 1952

= Eratoneura =

Genus of leafhoppers

Eratoneura is a genus of leafhoppers in the family Cicadellidae. There are at least 190 described species in Eratoneura.

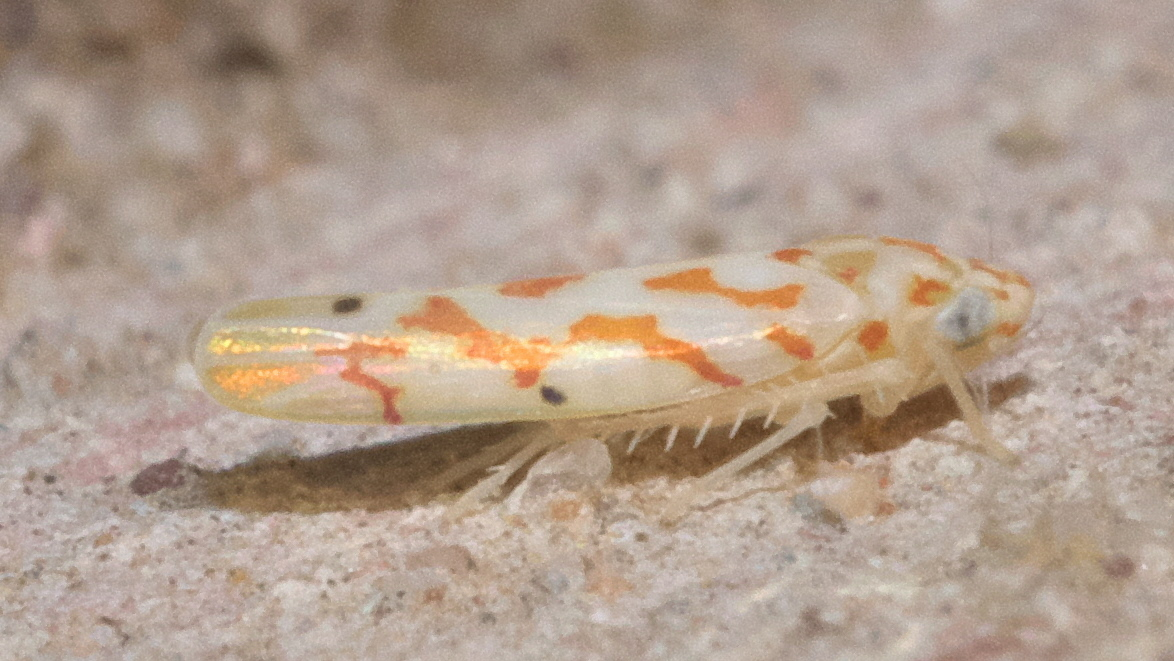

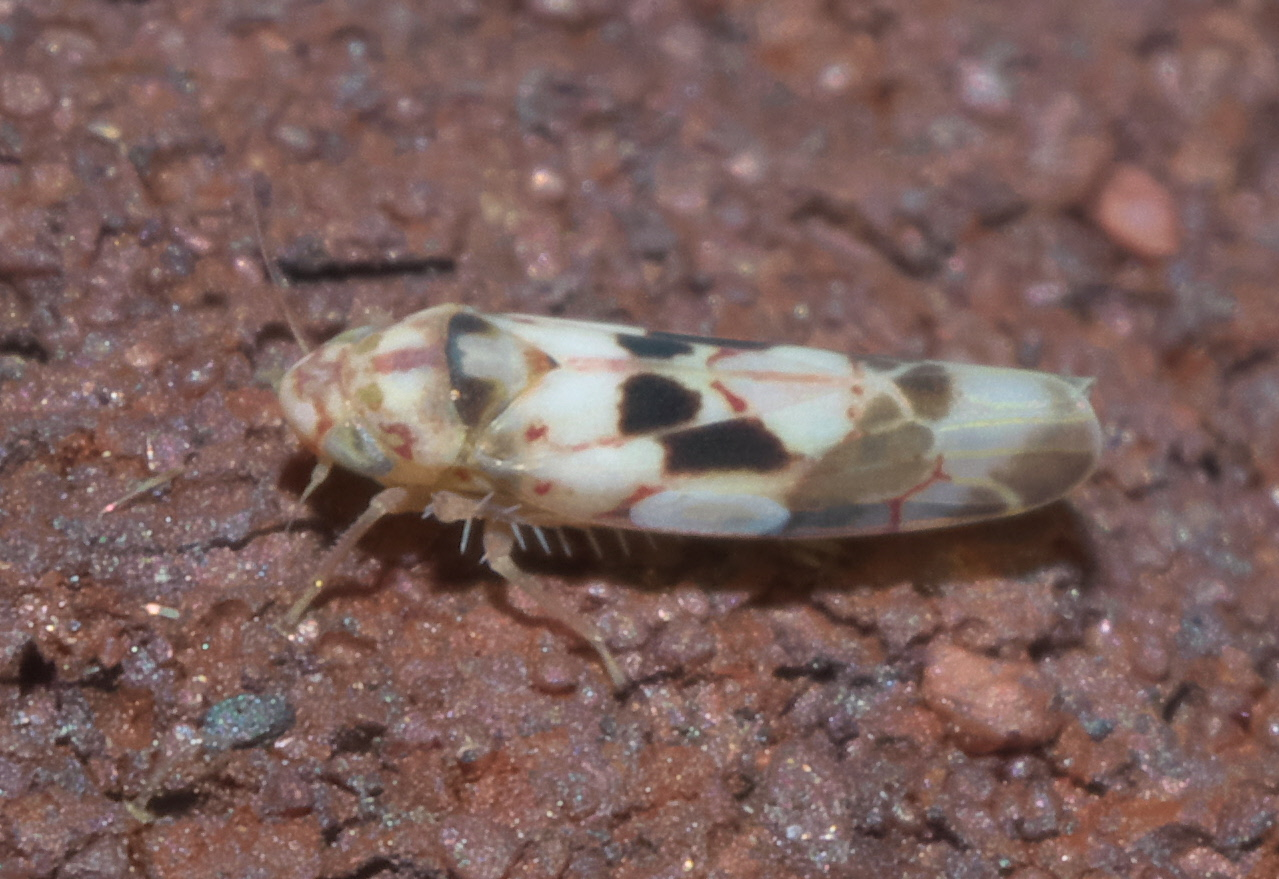

== See also ==
- List of Eratoneura species
