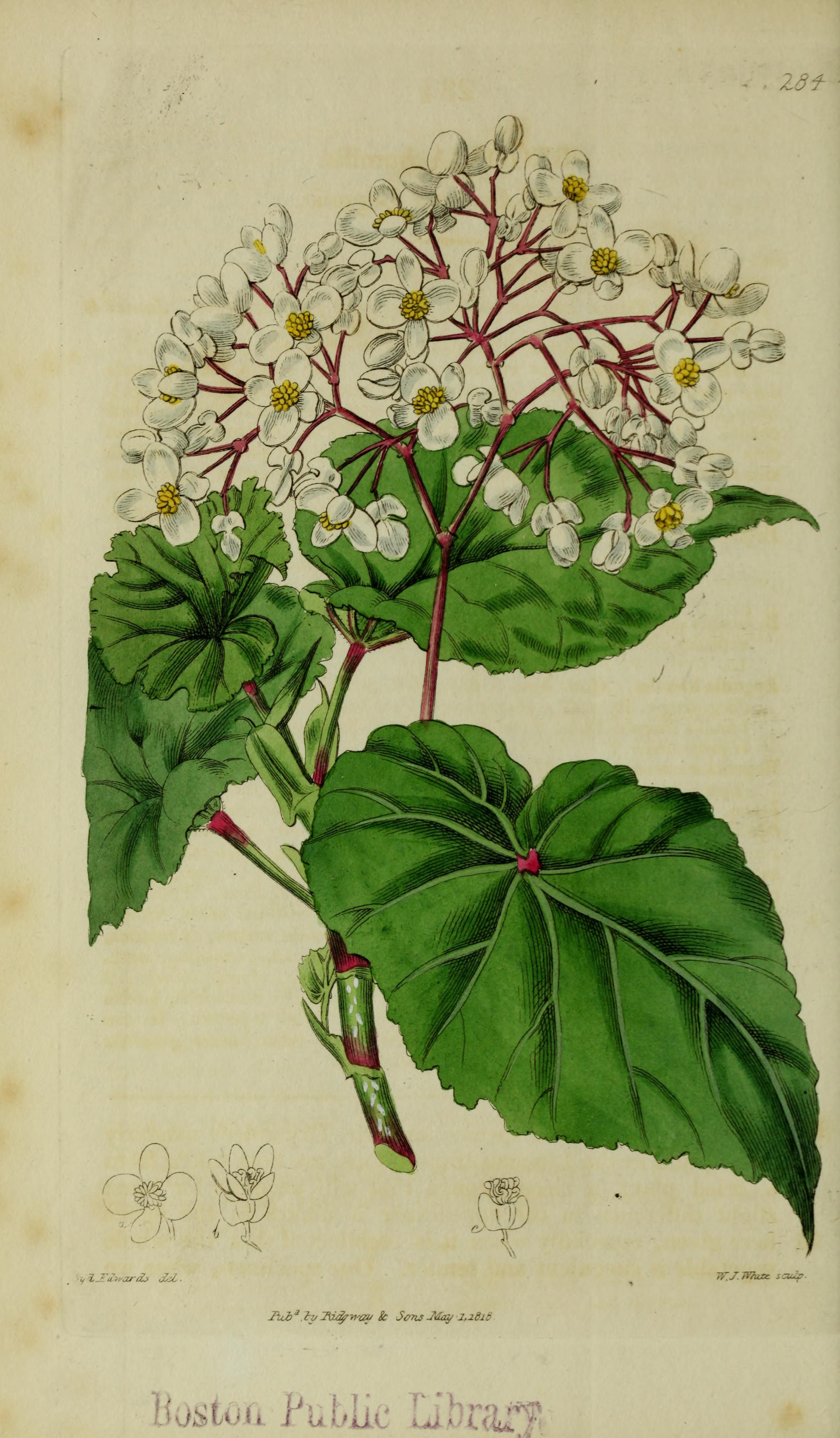
- Illustration by Sydenham Edwards

Scientific classification
- Kingdom: Plantae
- Clade: Tracheophytes
- Clade: Angiosperms
- Clade: Eudicots
- Clade: Rosids
- Order: Cucurbitales
- Family: Begoniaceae
- Genus: Begonia
- Species: B. ferruginea

Binomial name
- Begonia ferruginea L.f.

Synonyms
- List: Casparya ferruginea (L.f.) A.DC.; Stibadotheca ferruginea (L.f.) Klotzsch; Begonia ferruginea var. dilatata L.B.Sm. & B.G.Schub.; Begonia magnifica Warsz. ex A.DC.; Begonia magnifica (Klotzsch) Linden; Casparya ferruginea var. holtonis A.DC.; Stibadotheca magnifica Klotzsc

= Begonia ferruginea =

Species of flowering plant

Begonia ferruginea is a species of flowering plant in the family Begoniaceae, native to Colombia and northwest Venezuela. It is considered a shrub-like begonia.

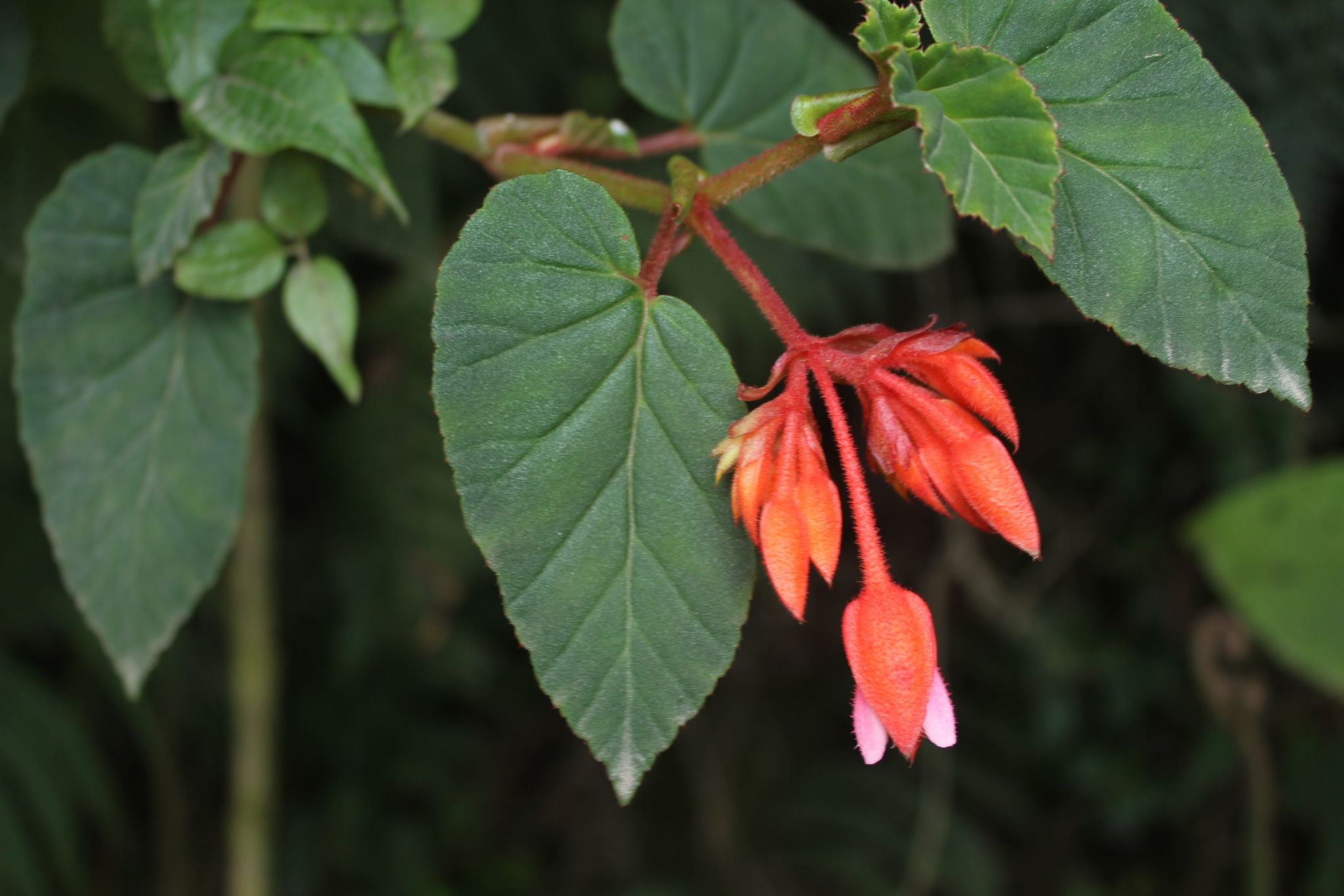
Photo showing inflorescence

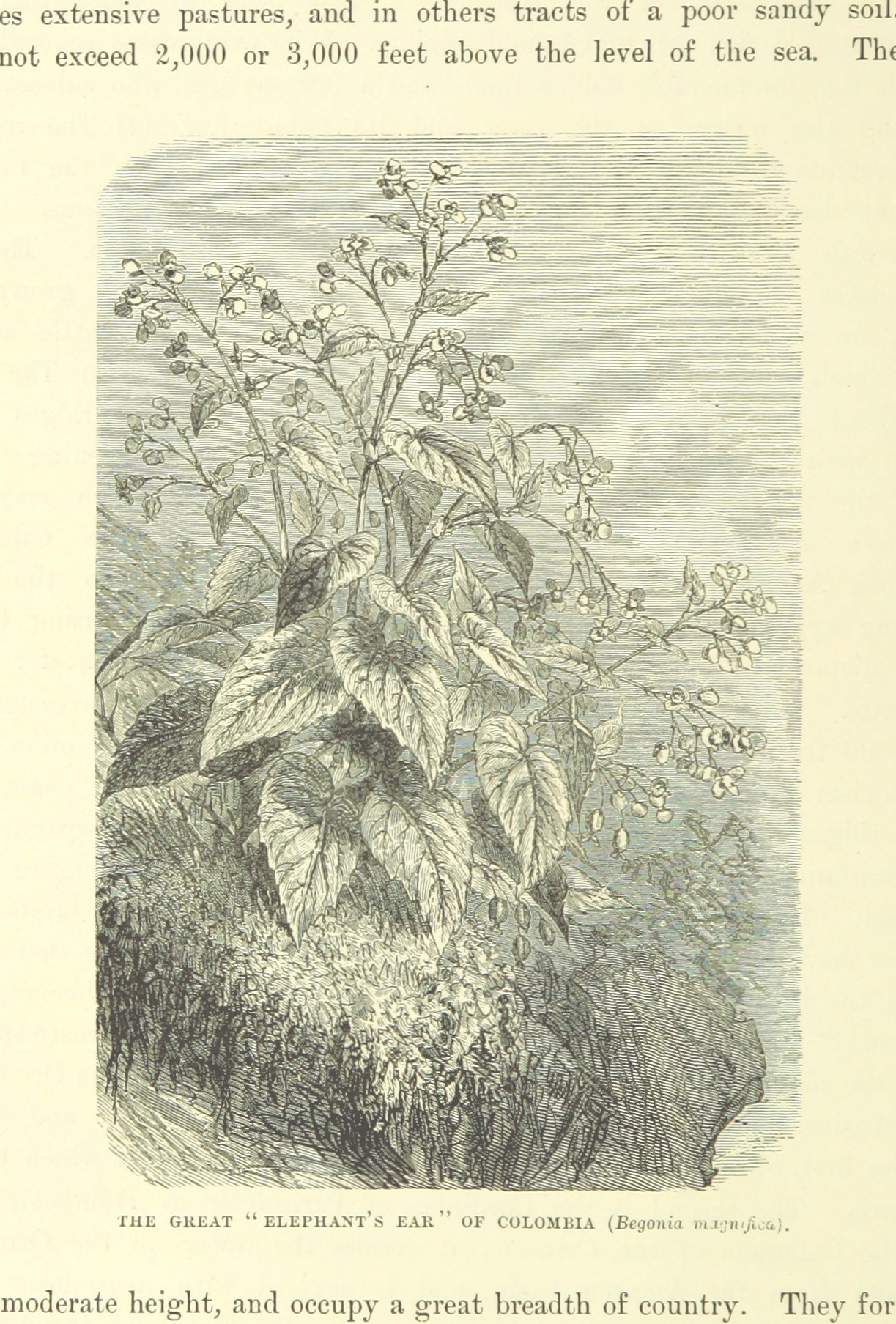
Illustration from 1894
