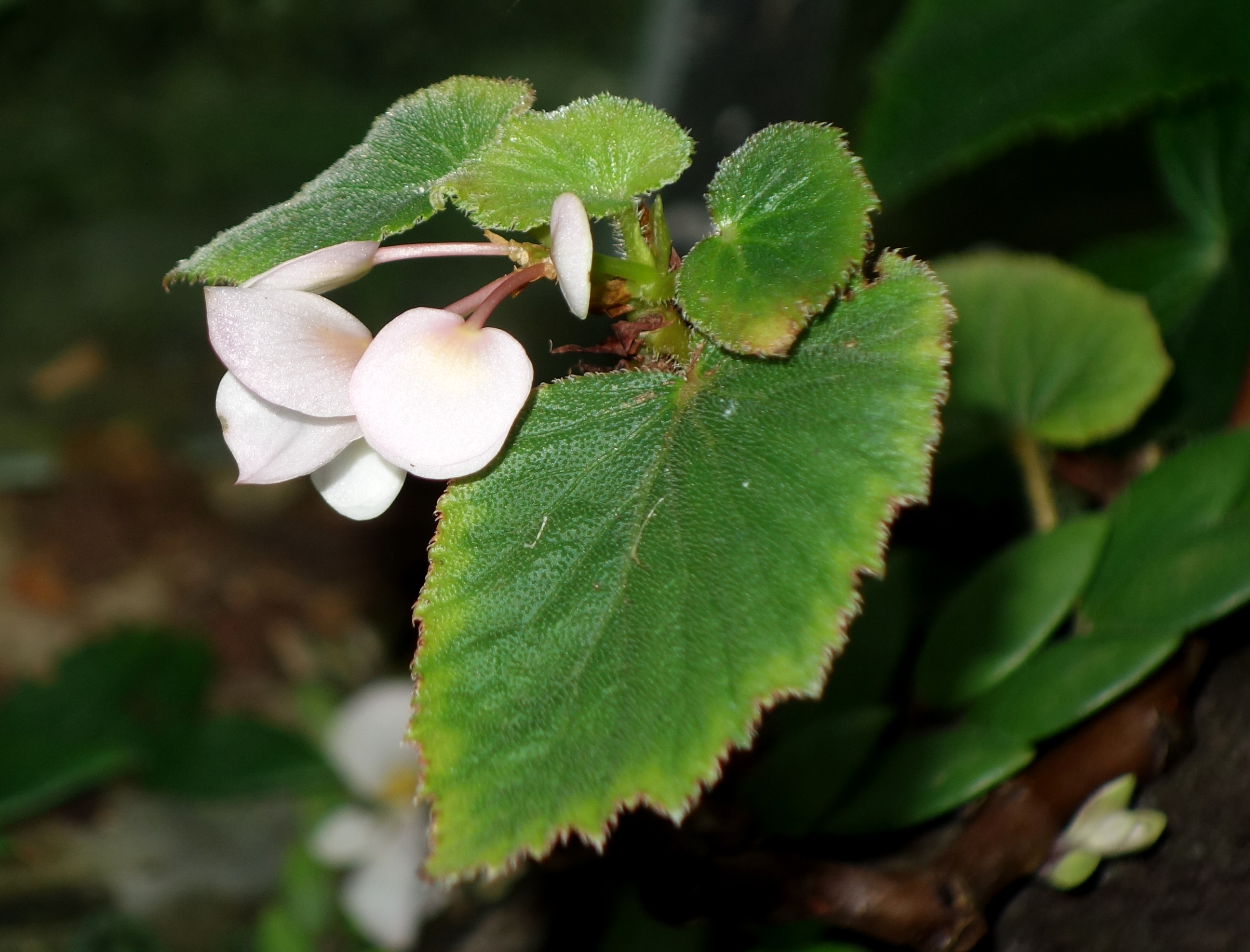

Scientific classification
- Kingdom: Plantae
- Clade: Embryophytes
- Clade: Tracheophytes
- Clade: Spermatophytes
- Clade: Angiosperms
- Clade: Eudicots
- Clade: Rosids
- Order: Cucurbitales
- Family: Begoniaceae
- Genus: Begonia
- Species: B. dipetala

Binomial name
- Begonia dipetala Graham

Synonyms
- List: Begonia malabarica var. dipetala (Graham) Thwaites; Haagea dipetala (Graham) Klotzsch; Begonia bipetala Lodd. ex Otto & A.Dietr.

= Begonia dipetala =

Species of flowering plant

Begonia dipetala is a species of flowering plant in the family Begoniaceae, native to India near Bombay. It is the type species and the only species in the section Haagea. It is a thick-stemmed Begonia.

Begonia dipetala was first documented in 1826 by Harry Johnston in Bombay, and first described by Graham in Curtis's Botanical Magazine in 1828. In 1913 it was introduced to the United States accidentally under the name B. 'Mrs. W.S. Kimball'.
