= Fanny Blood =

British artist, teacher (1758–1785)

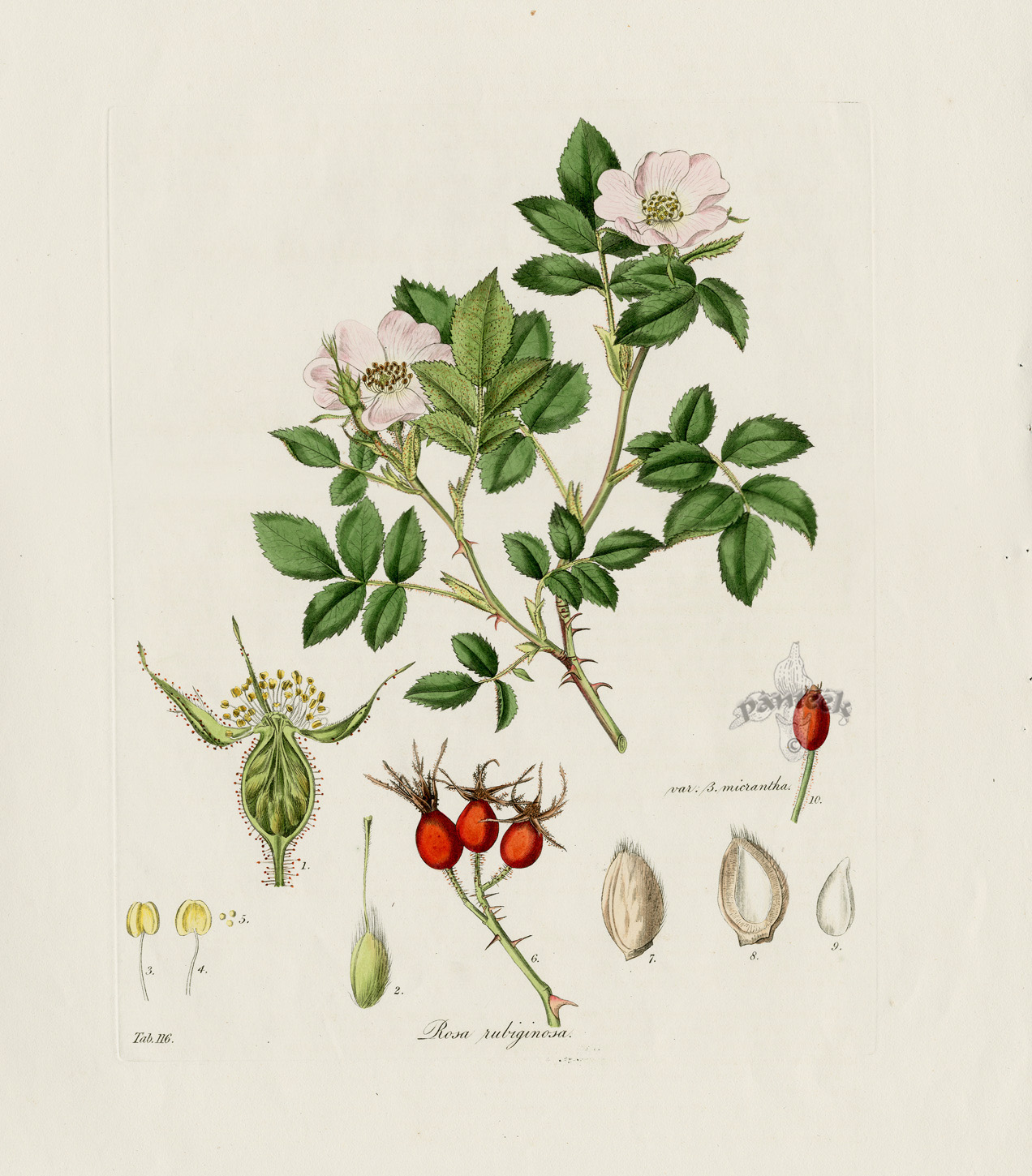
- A plate from Flora Londinensis
- Born: Frances Blood; 1758
- Died: 29 November 1785 (aged 26–27); Lisbon
- Burial place: British Cemetery, Lisbon Portugal
- Spouse: Hugh Skeys
- Children: William Skeys (d.1786)

Frances Blood (1758 – 29 November 1785) was an English illustrator and educator, and longtime friend of Mary Wollstonecraft.

== Early life ==
Blood was born in 1758, the daughter of Matthew Blood the Younger (1730–1794) and Caroline Roe (c. 1730–1805).

== Career ==
Blood was paid by the botanist William Curtis to paint wildflowers for his book Flora Londinensis. This created an income for her family. Blood was engaged to Hugh Skeys, a wine merchant of Dublin, but her fiancé had gone to sea to establish money that would finance their marriage.

Fanny Blood and her brother, Lieutenant George Blood (1762–1844), were good friends with Mary Wollstonecraft. They met in 1774 after introductions by common friends, the Clares. As Wollstonecraft's husband William Godwin wrote, Wollstonecraft "contracted a friendship so fervent, as for years to have constituted the ruling passion of her mind".

Blood, together with Mary Wollstonecraft and Wollstonecraft's sisters, Eliza and Everina, opened a school, first in Islington, which soon failed, and then in Newington Green. The school was combined with a boarding house for women and their children. On 24 February 1785 Blood married Skeys. When Blood married and left the school, Wollstonecraft left too, to take care of her friend. In their absence the second school failed as well.

Blood died in childbirth in Lisbon, Portugal, on 29 November 1785. She was buried in the British Cemetery in Lisbon with her son William Skeys. Wollstonecraft was deeply affected by Blood's death, which in part inspired her first novel, Mary: A Fiction (1788). Wollstonecraft named her daughter, Fanny Imlay (1794–1816), after her friend.

== Bibliography ==
- Godwin, William. Memoirs of the Author of A Vindication of the Rights of Woman. Eds. Pamela Clemit and Gina Luria Walker. Peterborough: Broadview Press, 2001. ISBN 1-55111-259-0.
