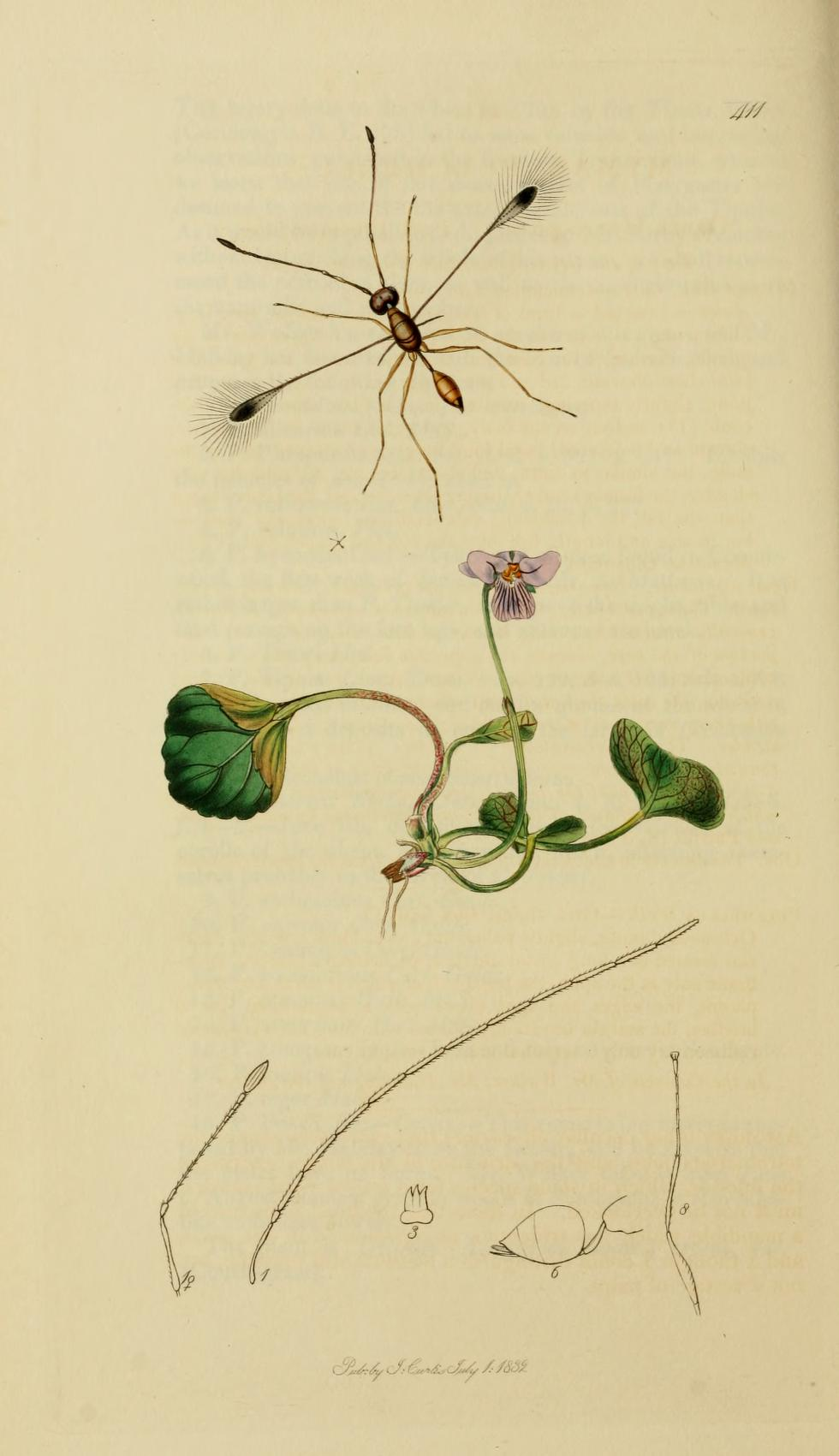
- An illustration of Mymar pulchellum by John Curtis, 1840

Scientific classification
- Domain: Eukaryota
- Kingdom: Animalia
- Phylum: Arthropoda
- Class: Insecta
- Order: Hymenoptera
- Family: Mymaridae
- Genus: Mymar
- Species: M. pulchellum

Binomial name
- Mymar pulchellum Curtis, 1832

Synonyms
- Mymar pulchellus Curtis, 1832; Mymar spectabilis Förster, 1856; Mymar venustum Girault, 1911; Mymarilla venusta (Girault, 1911); Oglobliniella pulchella (Curtis, 1832); Pterolinononyketra obenbergeri Malac, 1943; Pterolinononyketra venusta (Girault, 1911)

= Mymar pulchellum =

Species of fairyfly

Mymar pulchellum is a species of fairyfly within the family Mymaridae found in Sweden. The species is diurnal and parasitizes Fagus sylvatica and Medicago sativa.
