= William Kilburn =

Illustrator, designer and printer of calico

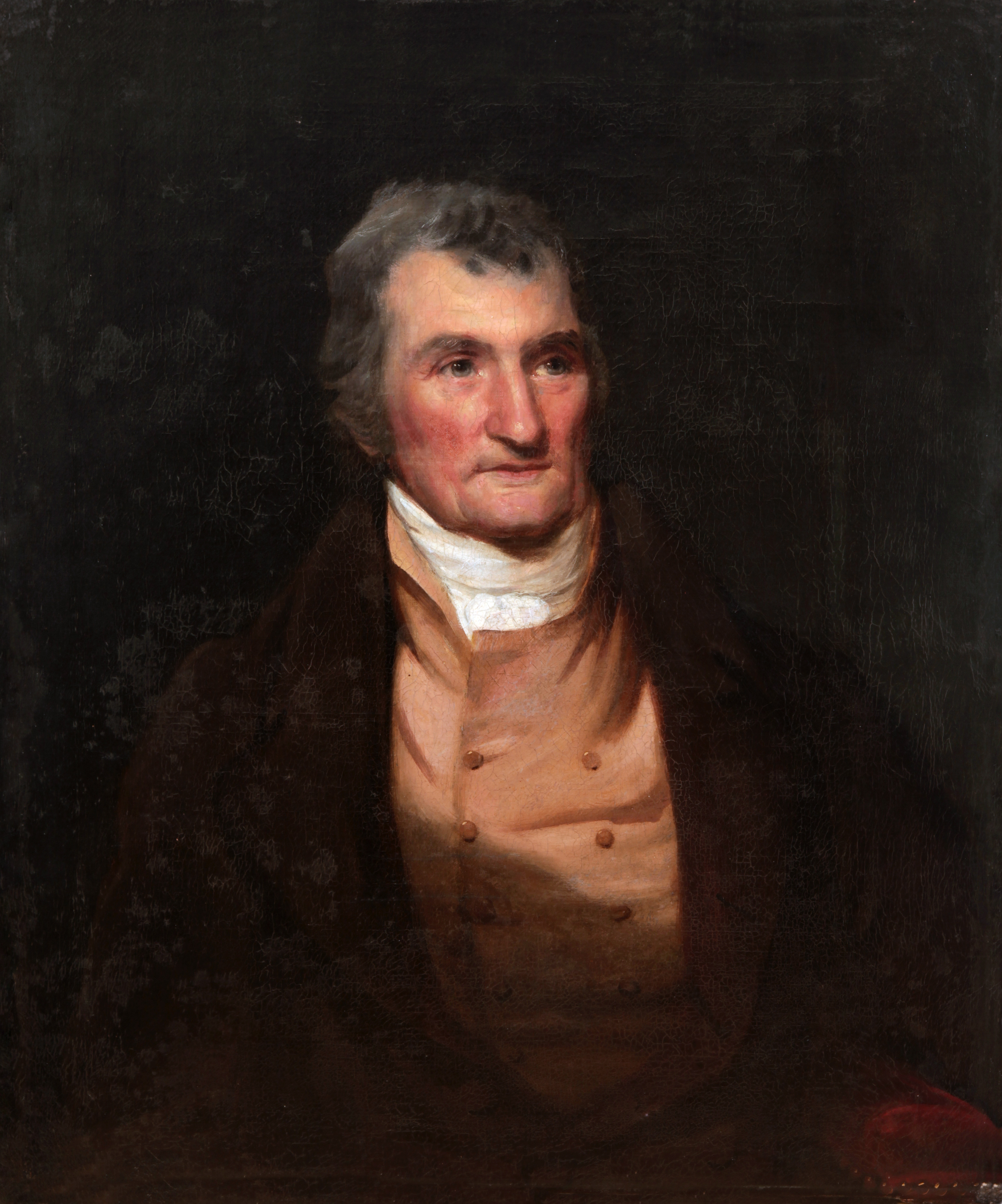
- Portrait painted c.1805 by Samuel Drummond
- Born: 1745; Dublin, Ireland
- Died: 1818 (aged 72–73)
- Known for: Illustrations, calico printing

William Kilburn (1745–1818) was an illustrator for William Curtis' Flora Londinensis, as well as a leading designer and printer of calico. A few hundred originals of his water colour designs make up the Kilburn Album, housed at the Victoria and Albert Museum in London.

William Kilburn was born in Dublin in 1745. He was the son of a Dublin architect, Samuel Kilburn (d.1770), and was an apprentice to a calico printer, but spent his spare time engraving and sketching. He moved to Bermondsey after his father's death, and found living quarters near Curtis's nursery. Within a short while his skills were being used in the Flora Londinensis, for which he provided life-sized preparatory watercolours and thirty-one signed etchings. An engraved, illustrated trade card for the gardener Thomas Greening in the British Museum, London, further attests to Kilburn's activity in this medium. He soon returned to calico printing, becoming financially successful.

Kilburn was the chief petitioner in March 1787, requesting Parliament for design copyright protection in the textile industry. At that time Kilburn was a calico printer at Wallington in Surrey. Ralph Yates, who was a London warehouseman, regularly sold Kilburn's designs to the firm of Peel & Co. in Bury in Lancashire, who would copy the design and produce a cheaper fabric that appeared in shops within a few days. Consequently, the House of Commons proposed a Bill to control the plagiarism, a step meeting furious objections from Carlisle, Aberdeen, Manchester and Lancashire, who felt that their trade would collapse. The bill was passed in May 1787 "An Act for the Encouragement of the Arts of designing and printing Linens, Cottons, Callicoes and Muslins by vesting the Properties thereof in the Designers, Printers, Proprietors for a limited Time." This "limited Time" was a period of two months from the date of first publishing.

Many of Kilburn's works are available for viewing at The Victoria and Albert Museum, in South Kensington, London. An archive of Kilburn patterns are also available from the online V&A archives.

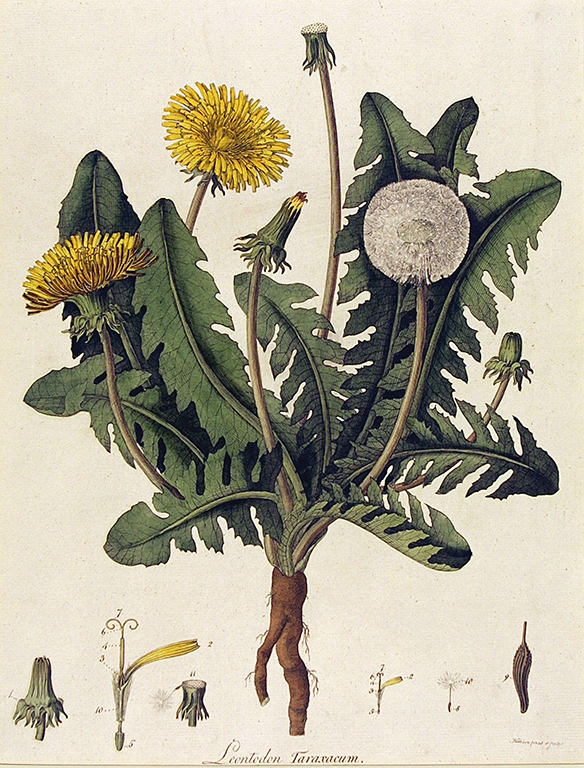
Illustration of dandelion from Flora Londinensis

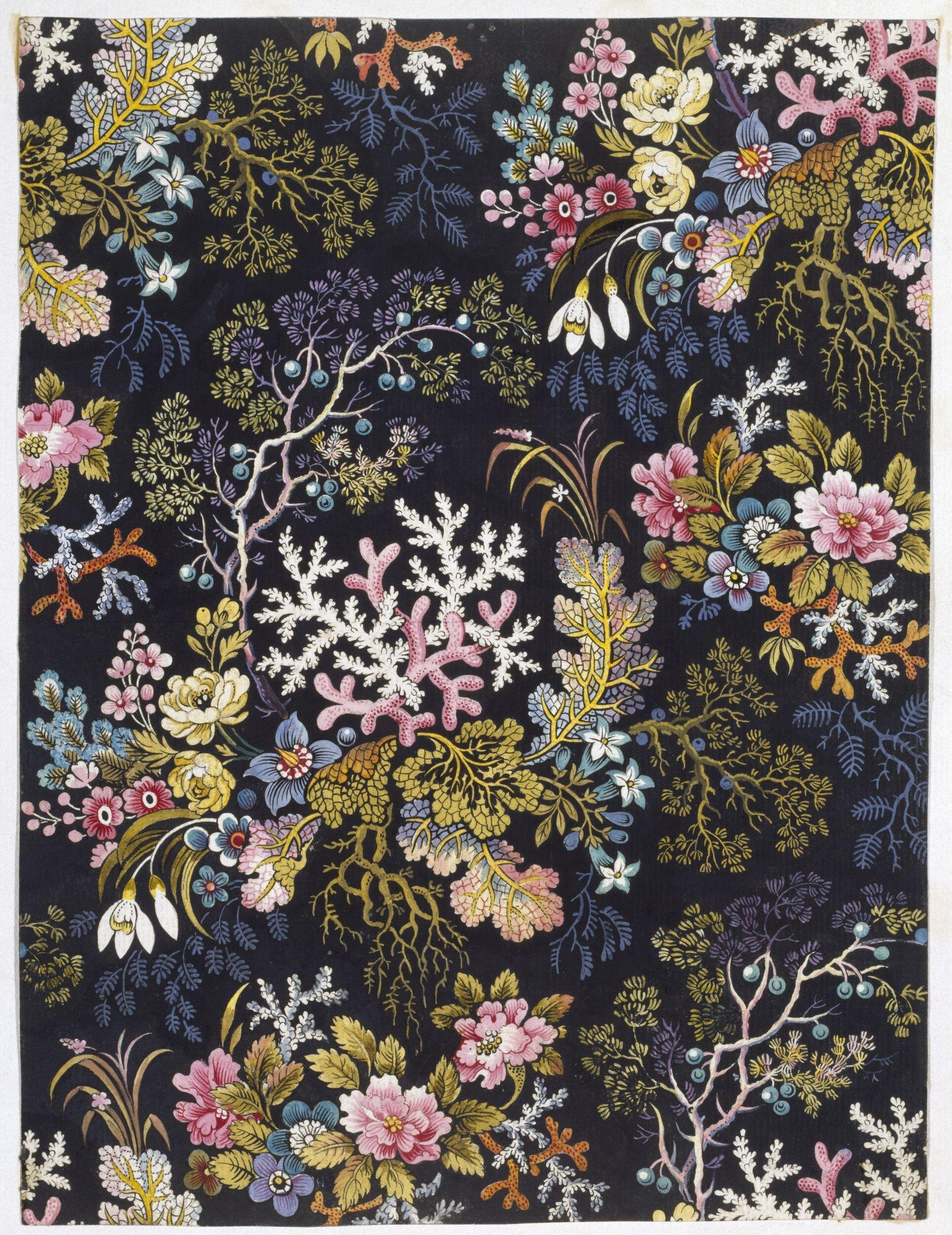
Printed cotton with seaweed pattern

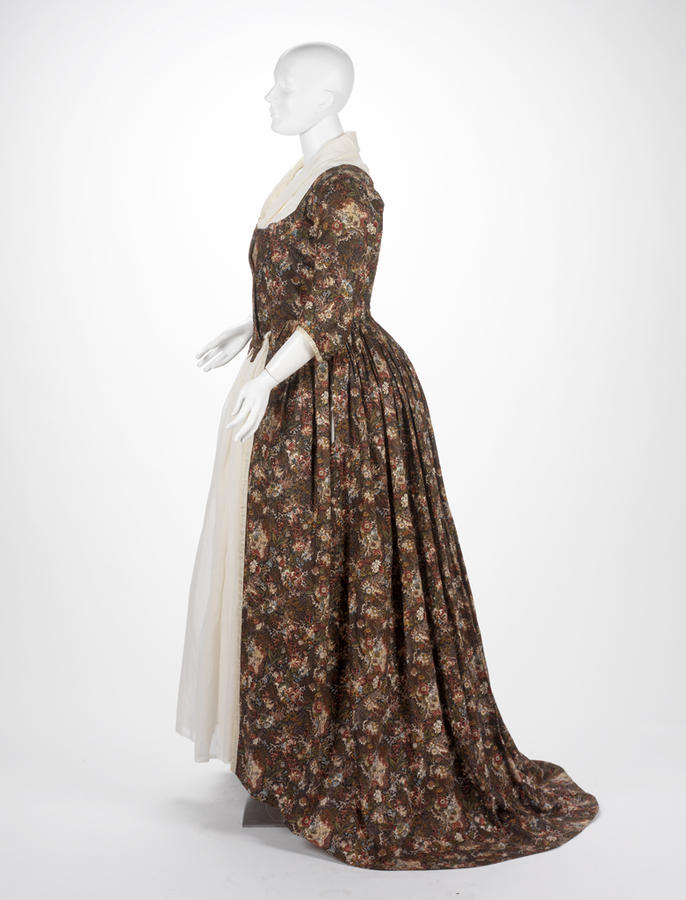
c.1790 dress in a Kilburn cotton print, (RISD Museum)

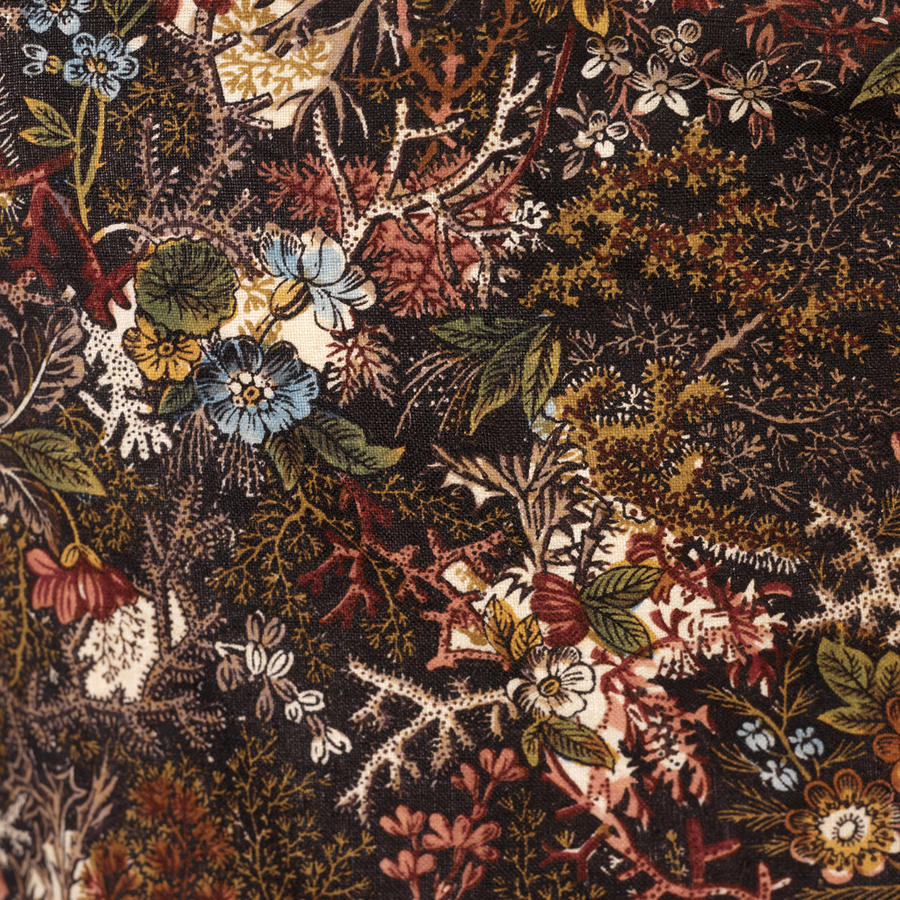
Detail of textile from dress
