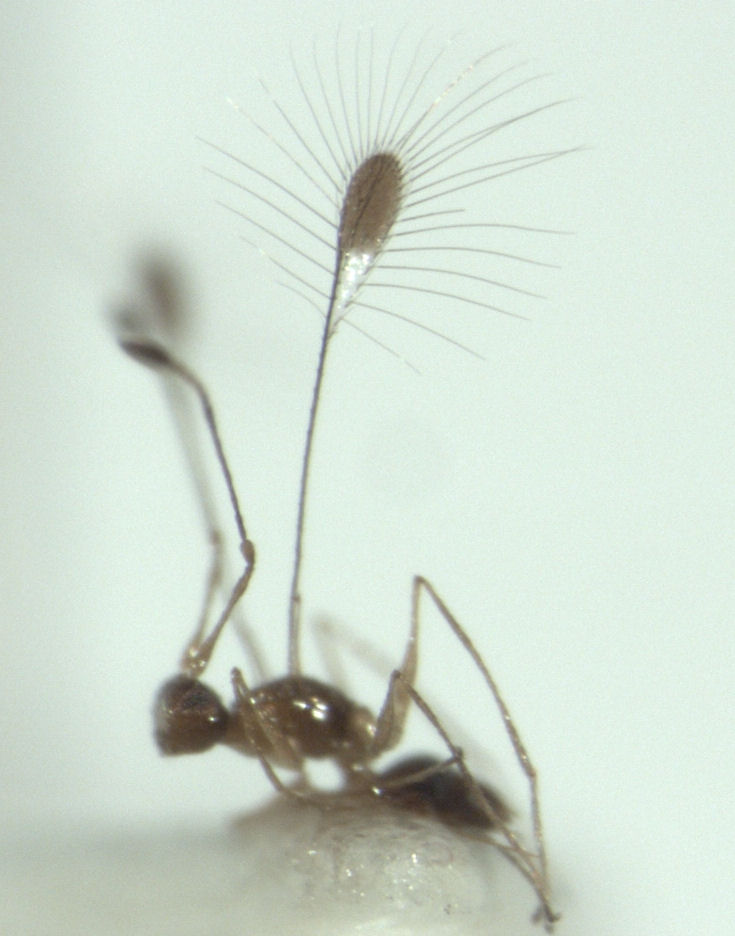

Scientific classification
- Domain: Eukaryota
- Kingdom: Animalia
- Phylum: Arthropoda
- Class: Insecta
- Order: Hymenoptera
- Family: Mymaridae
- Genus: Mymar; Curtis, 1829

= Mymar =

Genus of wasps

Mymar is a genus of fairyflies in the family Mymaridae. There are about 10 described species in Mymar.

== Species ==
These 10 species belong to the genus Mymar:

- Mymar africanum Annecke, 1961^{c g}
- Mymar cincinnati Girault, 1917^{c g}
- Mymar ermak Triapitsyn & Berezovskiy, 2001^{c g}
- Mymar maritimum Triapitsyn & Berezovskiy, 2001^{c g}
- Mymar pulchellum Curtis, 1832^{c g}
- Mymar ramym Donev & Triapitsyn^{g}
- Mymar regale Enock, 1912^{c g}
- Mymar schwanni Girault, 1912^{c g}
- Mymar taprobanicum Ward, 1875^{c g b}
- Mymar wollastonii Westwood, 1879^{g}

Data sources: i = ITIS, c = Catalogue of Life, g = GBIF, b = Bugguide.net
