= Flora Londinensis =

1777 book by William Curtis

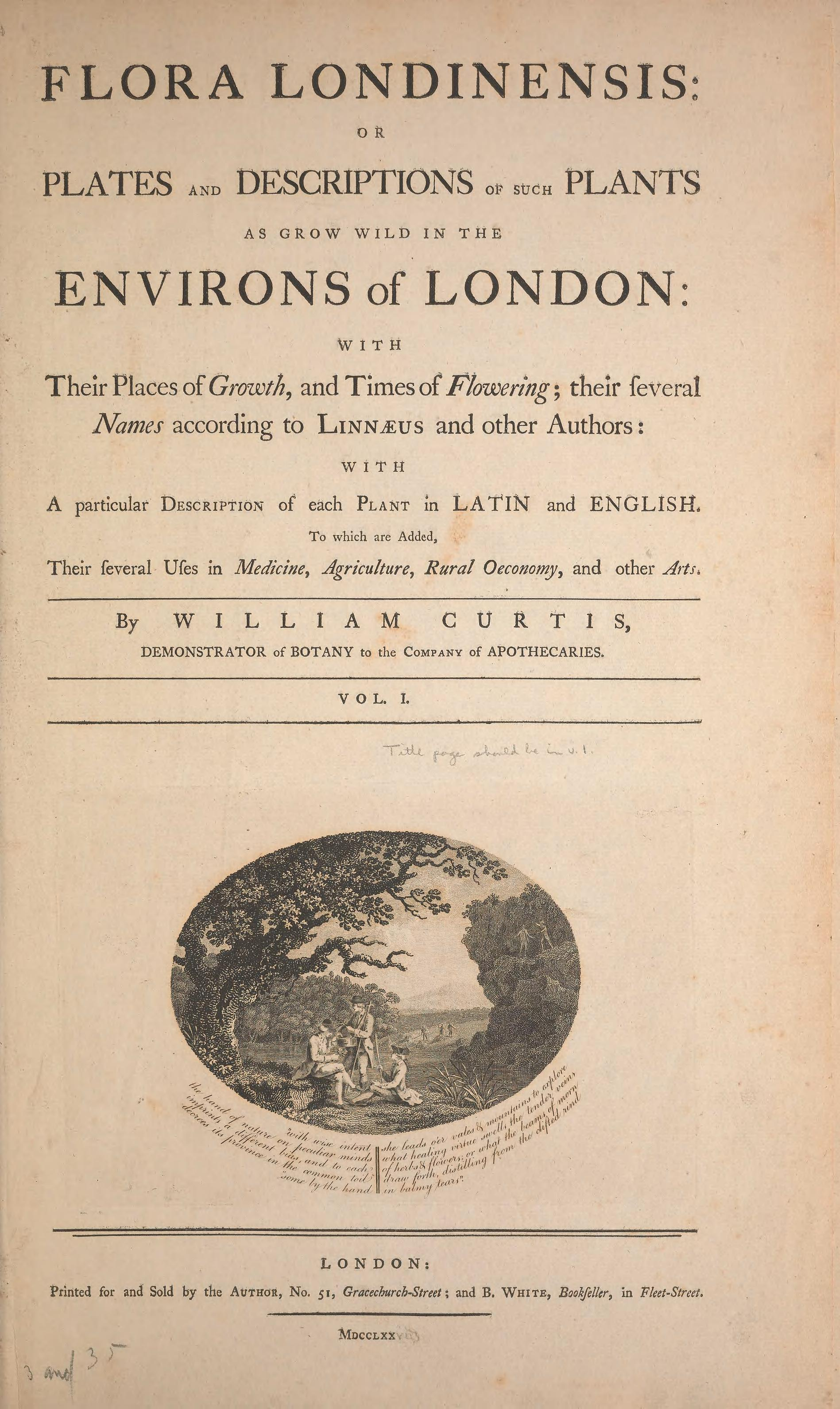
- William Curtis, Flora Londinensis, 1770, title page
- Author: William Curtis
- Illustrator: James Sowerby, et al.
- Series: Six volumes
- Subject: Botany
- Publisher: William Curtis, London
- Publication date: 1777–1798
- Publication place: England
- Media type: Fascicles with plates
- Followed by: The Botanical Magazine

Flora Londinensis is a folio-sized book that described the flora found in the London region of the mid-18th century. The Flora was published by William Curtis in six large volumes. The descriptions of the plants included hand-coloured copperplate plates by botanical artists such as James Sowerby, Sydenham Edwards, William Kilburn and Fanny Blood.

The full title is Flora Londinensis: or, plates and descriptions of such plants as grow wild in the environs of London: with their places of growth, and times of flowering, their several names according to Linnæus and other authors: with a particular description of each plant in Latin and English. To which are added, their several uses in medicine, agriculture, rural œconomy and other arts.

The first volume was produced in 1777 and the final one, containing a title and an index, was published in 1798. A binary name is given for each species in the survey; common and other names are also provided. Previous works on the flora of Britain had been intended for scientists, apothecaries, and herbalists, while Flora Londinensis was written for the general reader. The appealing plates also provided botanical details which could assist in the identification of a species.

Curtis was praefectus horti (Director, Society of Apothecaries) at the Chelsea Physic Garden and a botanist with a broad knowledge of exotic species. However, Flora Londinensis covered the territory most familiar to him: the flowering species within a 10-mile radius of London. He commissioned several painters to produce hand-coloured copper engravings to accompany the pages. Curtis wrote the descriptions and managed the publishing and sales of the volumes, producing six fascicles of twelve issues, each containing six plates. The final survey eventually came to include many species found in southern England and a few others.

The Subscriber's List in Volume I records 321 names who between them subscribed for 331 complete copies. Plates were also sold individually, either coloured or plain. For such an expensive and high-quality work this was a surprisingly large output, a reflection of the esteem in which William Curtis was held. His The Botanical Magazine would be a greater financial success. James Sowerby, who helped to publish this work and provided over 70 of the plates, went on to produce natural history publications in a similar format, most notably English Botany, which comprised 36 volumes published over 23 years beginning in November 1790.

The work was effectively enlarged by the botanical illustrator William Hooker (1779–1832; sometimes confused with Sir William Jackson Hooker), who from 1805 to 1807 published The Paradisus Londinensis: or coloured figures of plants cultivated in the vicinity of the metropolis.

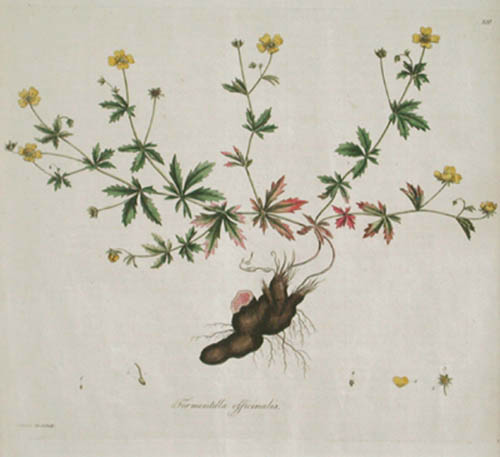
Tormentilla officinalis

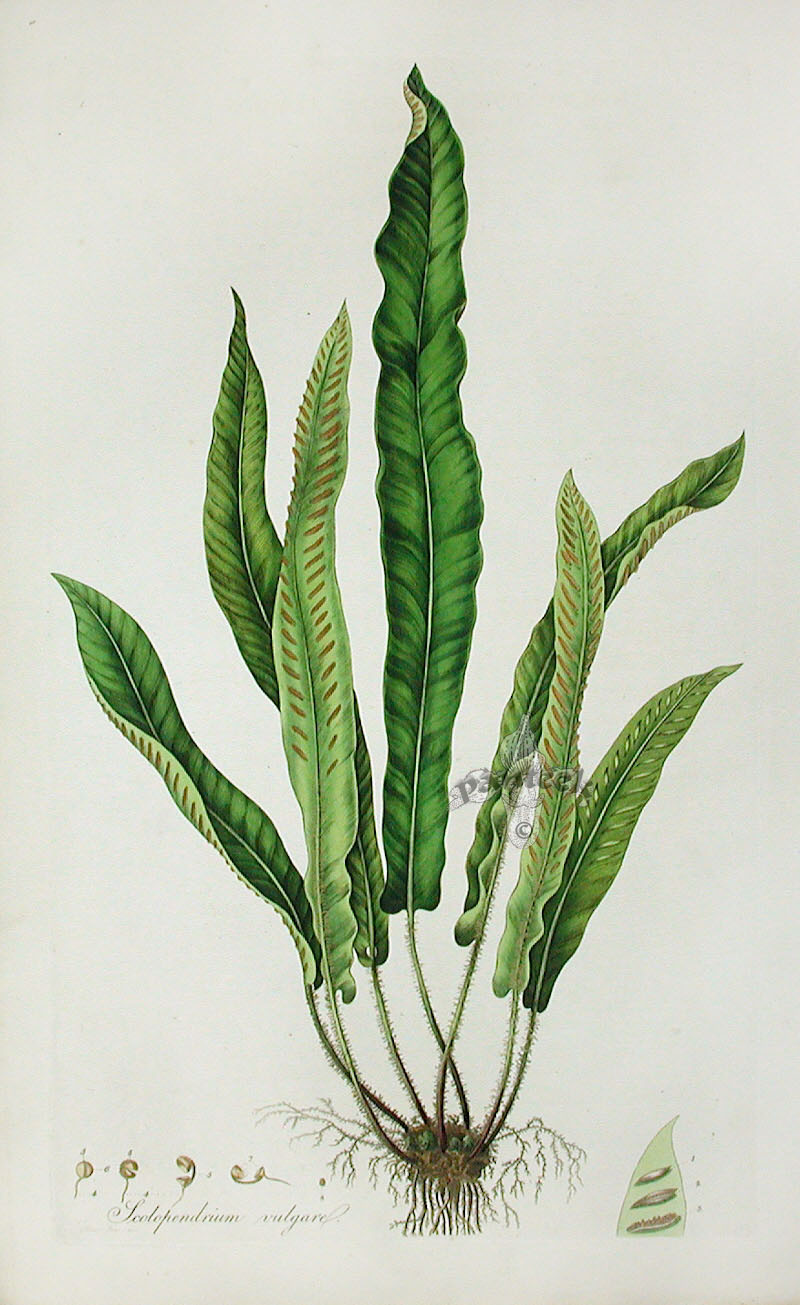
Scolopendrium vulgare

== See also ==
- English Botany
