= Mymar maritimum =

Scientific classification
- Kingdom: Animalia
- Phylum: Arthropoda
- Clade: Pancrustacea
- Class: Insecta
- Order: Hymenoptera
- Family: Mymaridae
- Genus: Mymar
- Species: M. maritimum

Binomial name
- Mymar maritimum Triapitsyn & Berezovskiy, 2010

Species of fairyfly

Mymar maritimum is a species of fairy wasp in the genus Mymar. The species is known from Asia. No male specimens are known.

== Description ==
Similar to other fairy wasps, the wings of M. maritimum are small, and covered in hair-like filaments. The head of females is trapezoidal. A majority of the body is brown, whilst the eyes are pinkish-brown.
