= Curtis's Botanical Magazine =

Scientific journal

- Curtis's Botanical Magazine, 1927 title page
- First issue: 1 February 1787
- ISSN: 1355-4905

The Botanical Magazine; or Flower-Garden Displayed, is an illustrated publication which began in 1787. The longest running botanical magazine, it is widely referred to by the subsequent name Curtis's Botanical Magazine.

Each of the issues contains a description, in formal yet accessible language, and is renowned for featuring the work of two centuries of botanical illustrators. Many plants received their first publication on the pages, and the description given was enhanced by the keenly detailed illustrations.

== History and profile ==
The first issue, published on 1 February 1787, was begun by William Curtis, as both an illustrated gardening and botanical journal. Curtis was an apothecary and botanist who held the position of Praefectus Horti (Director) and demonstrator of plants at the Chelsea Physic Garden, who had published the highly praised (but poorly sold) Flora Londinensis a few years before. The publication familiarized its readers with ornamental and exotic plants, which it presented in octavo format. Artists who had previously given over their flower paintings to an affluent audience, now saw their work published in a format accessible by a wider one. The illustrations were initially hand-coloured prints, taken from copper engravings and intended to complement the text. Identification by a general reader was given in exploded details, some of which were given as a section. This was accompanied by a page or two of text describing the plants properties, history, growth characteristics, and some common names for the species.

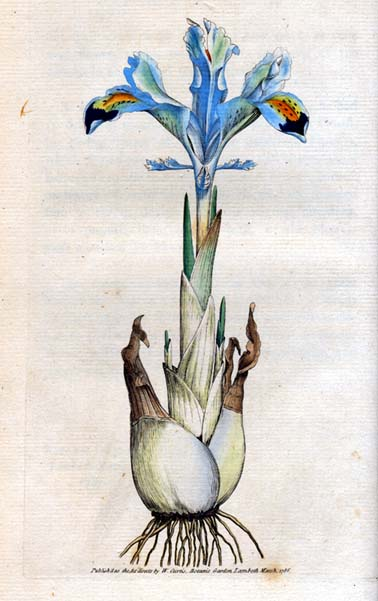
Iris persica (Sowerby)

The first volume's illustrations were mostly by Sydenham Edwards. A dispute with the editors saw his departure to start the rival The Botanical Register. The credit for the first plate (Iris persica) goes to James Sowerby, as did a dozen of Edwards contributions. The first thirty volumes used copper engraving to provide the plates, the hand colouring of these was performed by up to thirty people. An issue might have a circulation of 3000 copies, with 3 plates in each. As costs of production rose, and demand increased, results would be variable within a run. The later use of machine colouring would provide uniformity to the artists work, although the process could not give the same detail for many years. The magazine has been considered to be the premier journal for early botanical illustration.

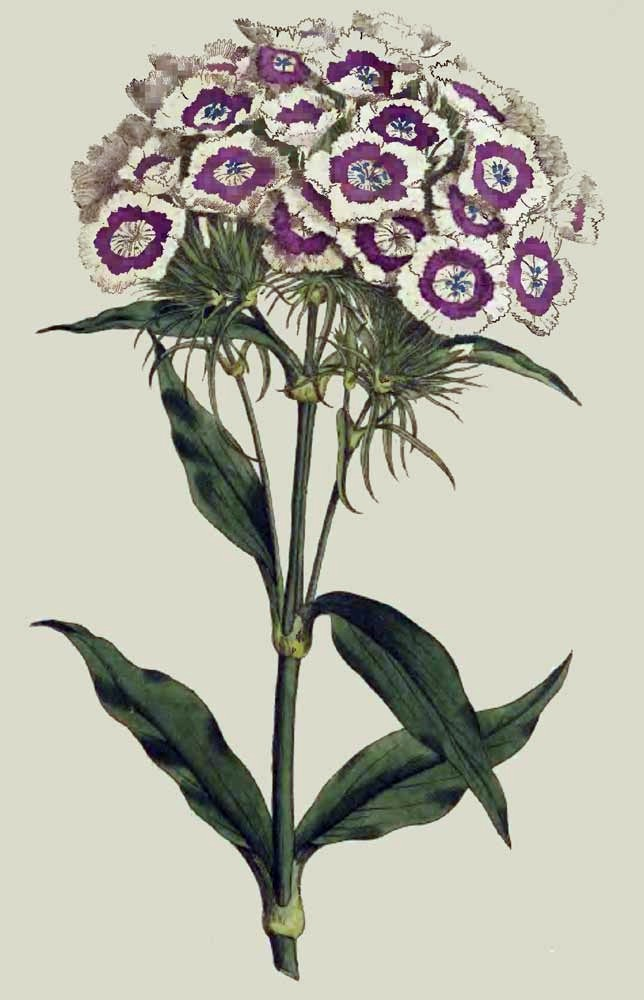
Dianthus barbatus Plate 207 (1793)

When Curtis died, having completed 13 volumes (1787–1800), his friend John Sims became editor between 1801 and 1826 (Volumes 14–53) and changed the name. William Hooker was the editor from 1827, bringing to it his experience as a botanist, and as author of the rival magazine, Exotic Botany. W. J. Hooker brought the artist Walter Hood Fitch to the magazine, this artist became the magazines principal artist for forty years.

Joseph Dalton Hooker followed his father, becoming the Director of Kew Gardens in 1865, and editor of its magazine. Fitch resigned from the magazine in 1877 following a dispute with Hooker—for whom Fitch had been preparing illustrations for several books—and Hooker's daughter Harriet Anne Hooker Thiselton-Dyer stepped in. She rendered almost 100 illustrations for publication during the period 1878–1880, helping to keep the magazine viable until the next principal artist, Matilda Smith took over as lead illustrator.

Like Thiselton-Dyer, Smith was brought to the magazine by Hooker, who was her cousin. Between 1878 and 1923 Smith drew over 2,300 plates for Curtis's. Her exceptional contribution was to see her become the first botanic artist of Kew, and she was later made an associate of the Linnean Society—the second woman to have achieved this. The scientific value of the figures and illustration, a source of pride and notability for the magazine, required the careful training of the illustrators. The artist worked closely with the botanist to depict a specimen, the use of exploded details surrounding the depiction gave the volumes practical appeal to botanists, horticulturalists, and gardeners.

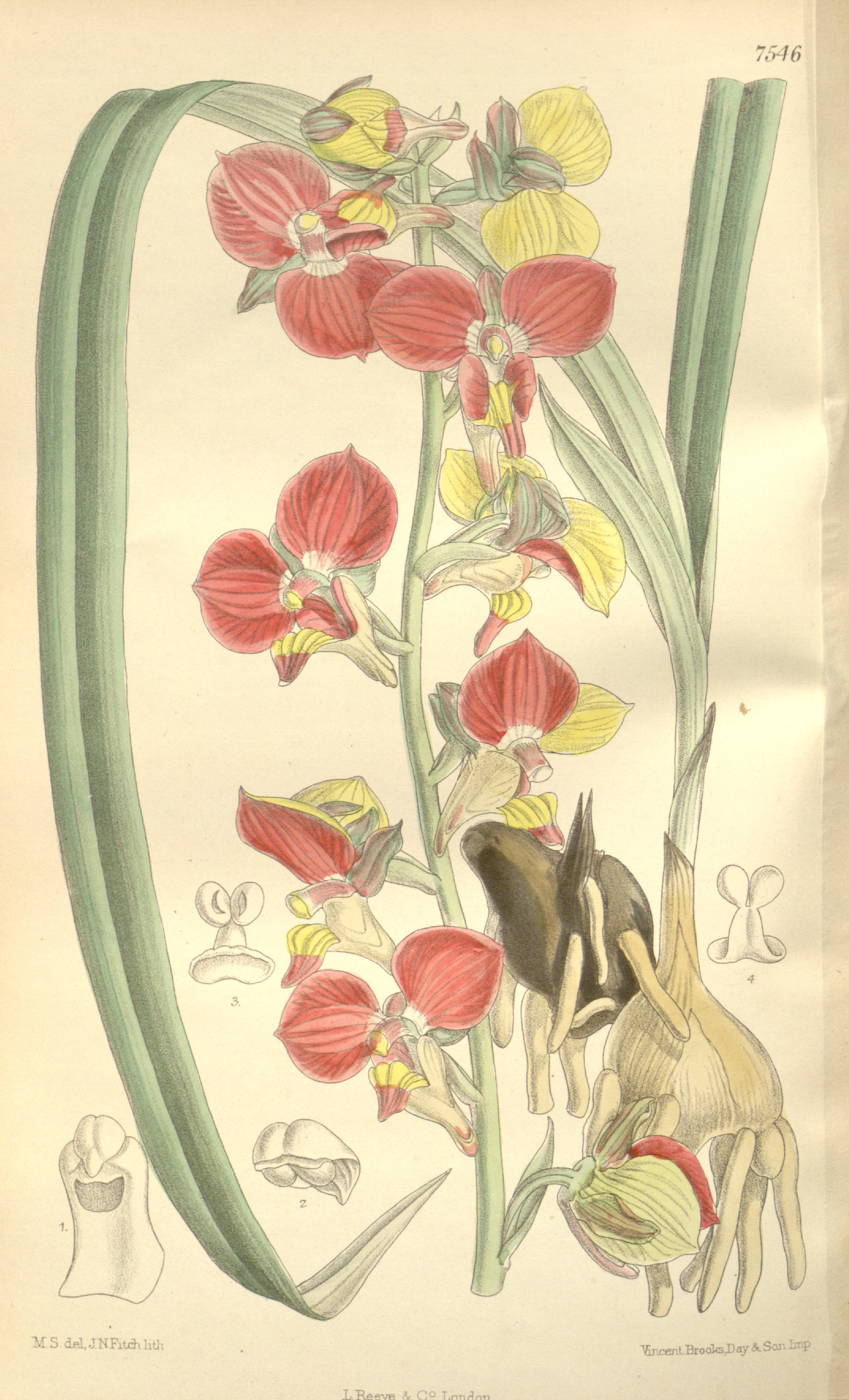
Eulophia orthoplectra Plate 7546 (1897)

The magazine is the greatest serial of botanical illustration yet produced, the consistent quality of the journal's plates and authority make this the most widely cited work of its kind. Other 19th century artists who contributed largely to the magazine include Augusta Innes Withers and Anne Henslow Barnard, Joseph Dalton Hooker's sister-in-law, who was active in the period 1879–1894. The hand-coloured plates were a labor-intensive process, but this tradition was continued by another principal illustrator, Lilian Snelling (1879–1972), from 1921 until 1948 A photomechanical process was implemented after this time. In 1921, Lilian Snelling, took over as chief illustrator on the magazine, a position she held until 1952, producing over 830 paintings and plates during her tenure. From 1929, she was assisted by Stella Ross-Craig, a talented illustrator and botanist who remained at Kew until the 1960s, contributing 3000 illustrations to many publications including Curtis's.

It has been published continuously ever since, with a change of name to The Kew Magazine from 1984 to 1994. In 1995 the name reverted to the widely cited Curtis's Botanical Magazine. It continues to be published by the Royal Botanic Gardens, Kew, as a publication for those interested in horticulture, ecology or botanical illustration.

The standard form of abbreviation is Curtis's Bot. Mag. or Botanical Magazine in the citation of botanical literature.

== Gallery ==
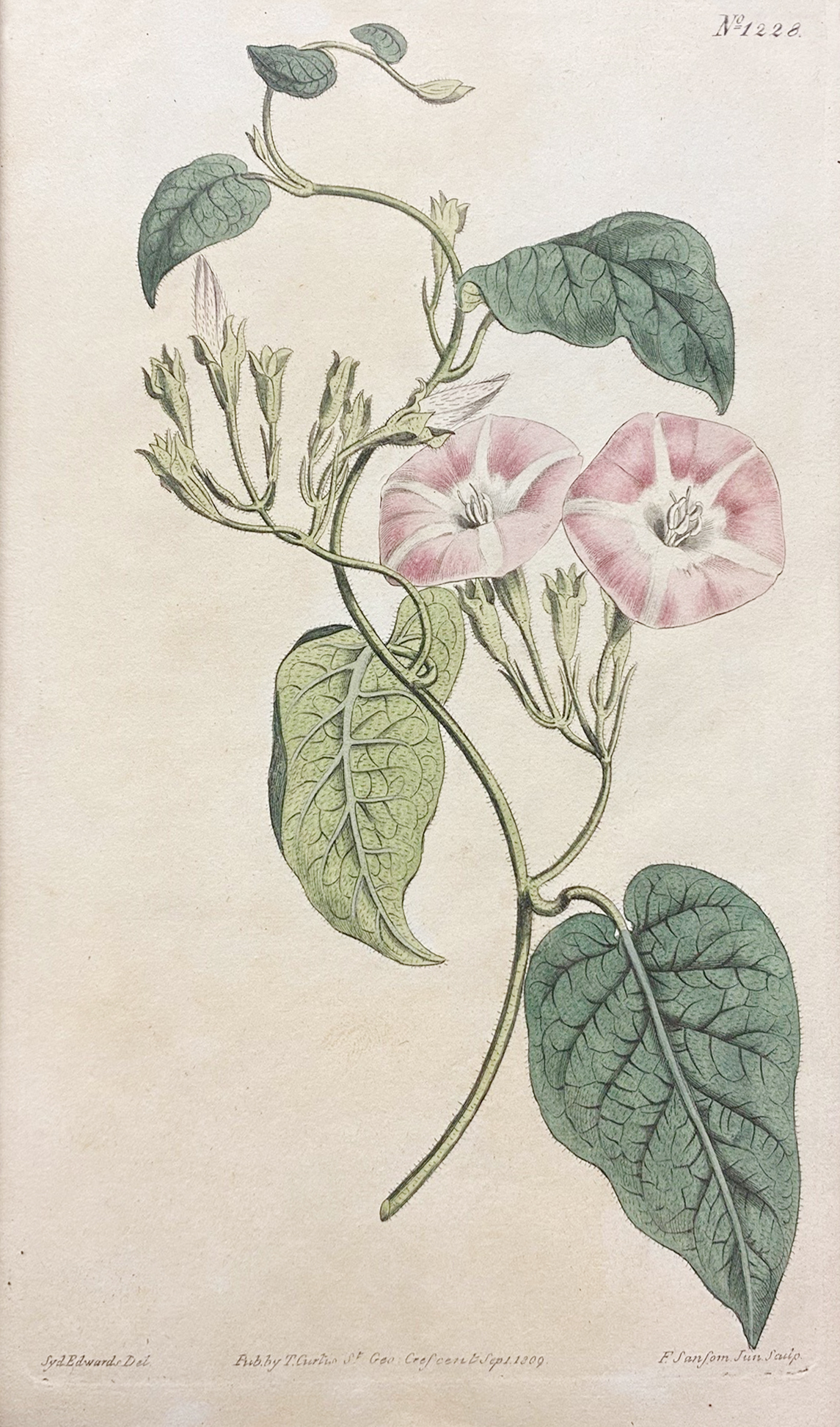
Convolvulus canariensis, Canary Bindweed, 1809. Copper engraving by F Sansom Junior from an illustration by Sydenham Teast Edwards.

Cynoglossum Pictum, Madeira Hound’s Tongue, 1820. Copper engraving by Weddell from an illustration by J Curtis.

Rosa semperflorens minima, known as Miss Lawrence’s Rose, 1815. Copper engraving by Weddell from an illustration by J Curtis.

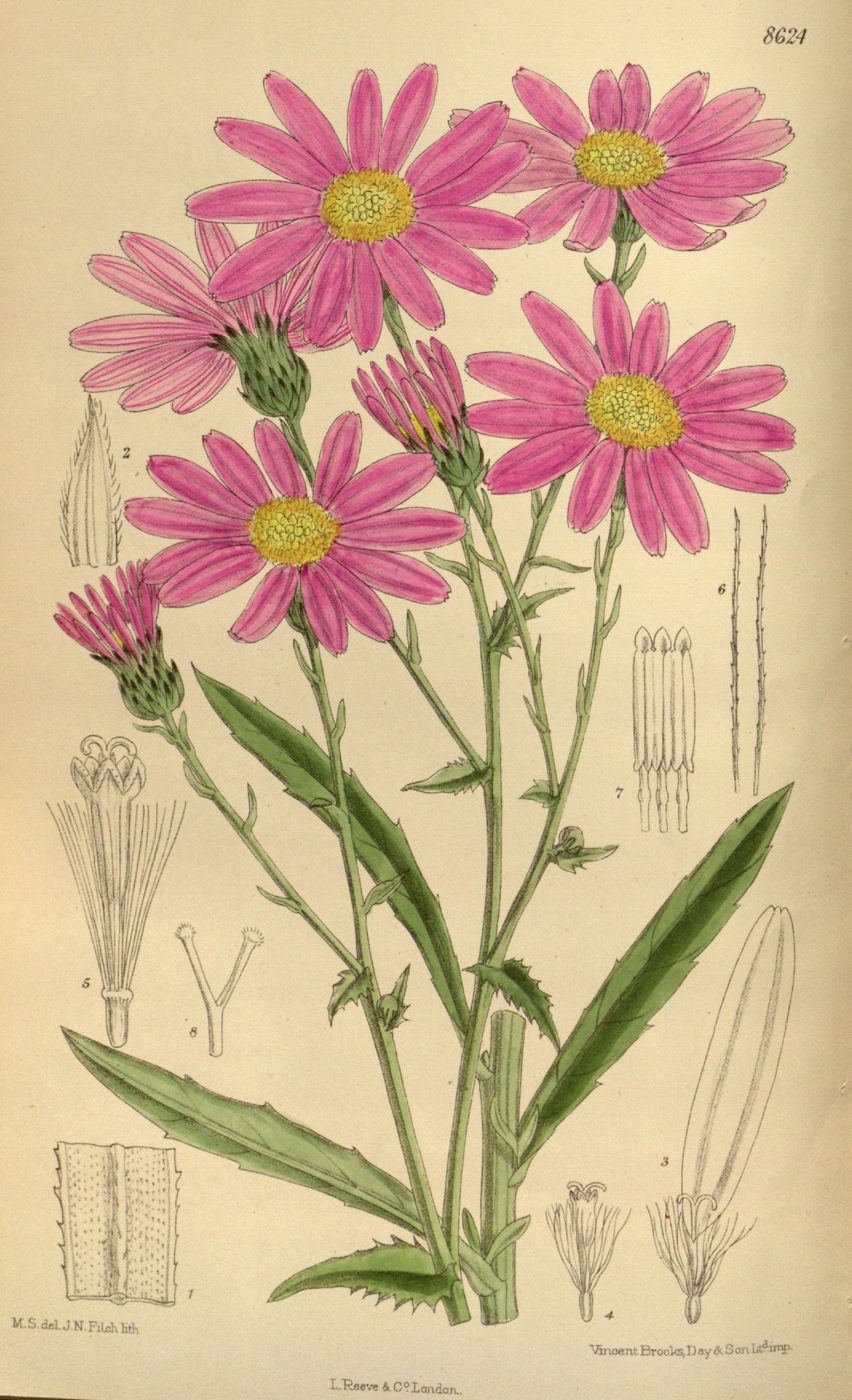
Senecio glastifolius, 1915. Lithograph by J.N. Fitch from an illustration by M.S.

== See also ==
- List of horticultural magazines

== Bibliography ==
- Martyn Rix (ed.). "Curtis's Botanical Magazine". Scientific Publications: Journals. Royal Botanic Gardens, Kew. Archived from the original on 6 July 2007. "Each four-part volume contains 24 plant portraits reproduced from watercolour originals"
- Cahill, Hugh (10 May 2006). "Case 3: William Curtis and The Botanical Magazine". Nature observed: The work of the botanical artist. King's College London. Archived from the original on 15 July 2007.
- "Curtis's Botanical Magazine. Kew". IPNI. 2 July 2003. "Id: 18697-2"
- Gardham, Julie (October 2004). "Curtis's Botanical Magazine". Special Collections Department: Book of the Month. Glasgow University Library. "it is the oldest periodical in existence featuring coloured plates, of which more than 11,000 have now been produced."
