= Sydenham Edwards =

Welsh botanist (1768–1819)

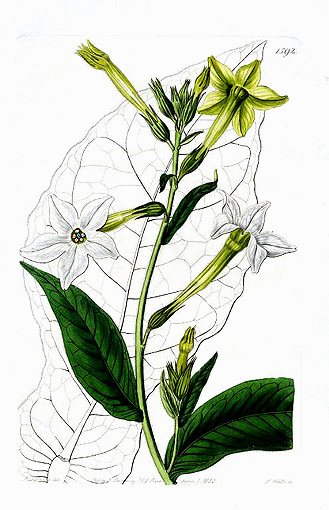
Nicotiana persica Lindl.

Sydenham Teast Edwards (5 August 1768 – 8 February 1819) was a natural history illustrator. He illustrated plants, birds and importantly published an illustrated book on the breeds of dogs in Britain, Cynographia Britannica.

Edwards was born in 1768 in Usk, Monmouthshire, the son of Lloyd Pittell Edwards, a schoolmaster and organist; and his wife, Mary Reese, who had been married on 26 September 1765, at Llantilio Crossenny Church, and where Sydenham was christened in 1768. Mary Reese was a sister of the Rev. William Reece, the curate of Llantilio Crossenny who had married Ann Mackafee. Their son, Richard Reece was an eminent physician and wrote a number of works on medicine. Young Edwards had a precocious talent for draughtsmanship and when only 11 years old had copied plates from Flora Londinensis for his own enjoyment. A certain Mr. Denman visited Abergavenny in 1779 and saw some of Edwards' work. Denman, being a friend of William Curtis, the publisher of botanical works, and founder of the Curtis's Botanical Magazine, spoke to Curtis about the boy. Curtis proceeded to have Edwards trained in both botany and botanical illustration.

Edwards produced plates at a prodigious rate: between 1787 and 1815 he produced over 1,700 watercolours for the Botanical Magazine alone. He illustrated Cynographia Britannica (1800) (an encyclopaedic compendium of dog breeds in Britain), New Botanic Garden (1805-7), New Flora Britannica (1812), and The Botanical Register (1815-19). Edwards established the latter under his own editorship in 1815 after a disagreement with John Sims, who succeeded Curtis as editor. He also provided drawings for encyclopedias such as Pantologia and Rees's Cyclopædia. He completed a number of parrot illustrations between 1810 and 1812 which were acquired by Edward Smith-Stanley, 13th Earl of Derby. Edwards was elected a Fellow of the Linnean Society in 1804.

Edwards' work inspired the decoration of ceramics made by a number of major potters of the time, such as Spode.

He was buried at Chelsea Old Church (All Saints), London.

There is confusion over the spelling of his middle name. He was baptised Sydenham Edwards, but by the 1790s adopted the middle name 'Teak' on some signatures of his drawings. His death certificate has this as 'Teaste', whereas his tombstone, in Chelsea Old Church, it was 'Teast'. A memorial in the church reads, "As a faithful delineator of nature, few equalled, none excelled." The tombstone was destroyed by bombings in World War II, but has been replaced.

== Gallery ==
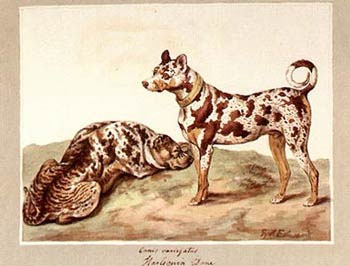

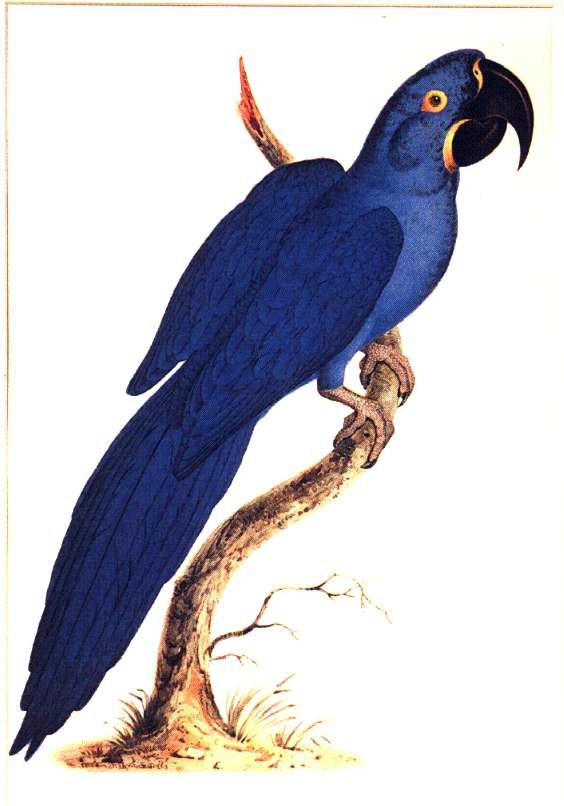

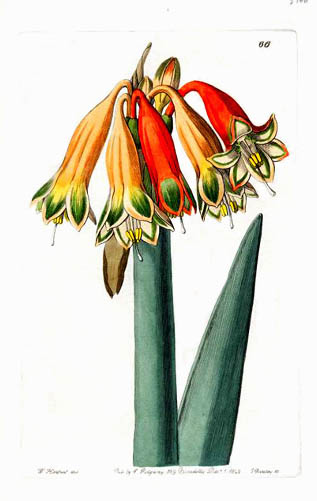

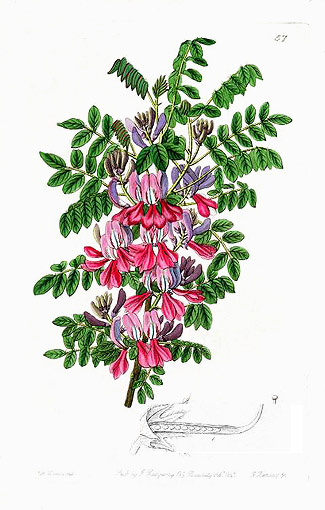

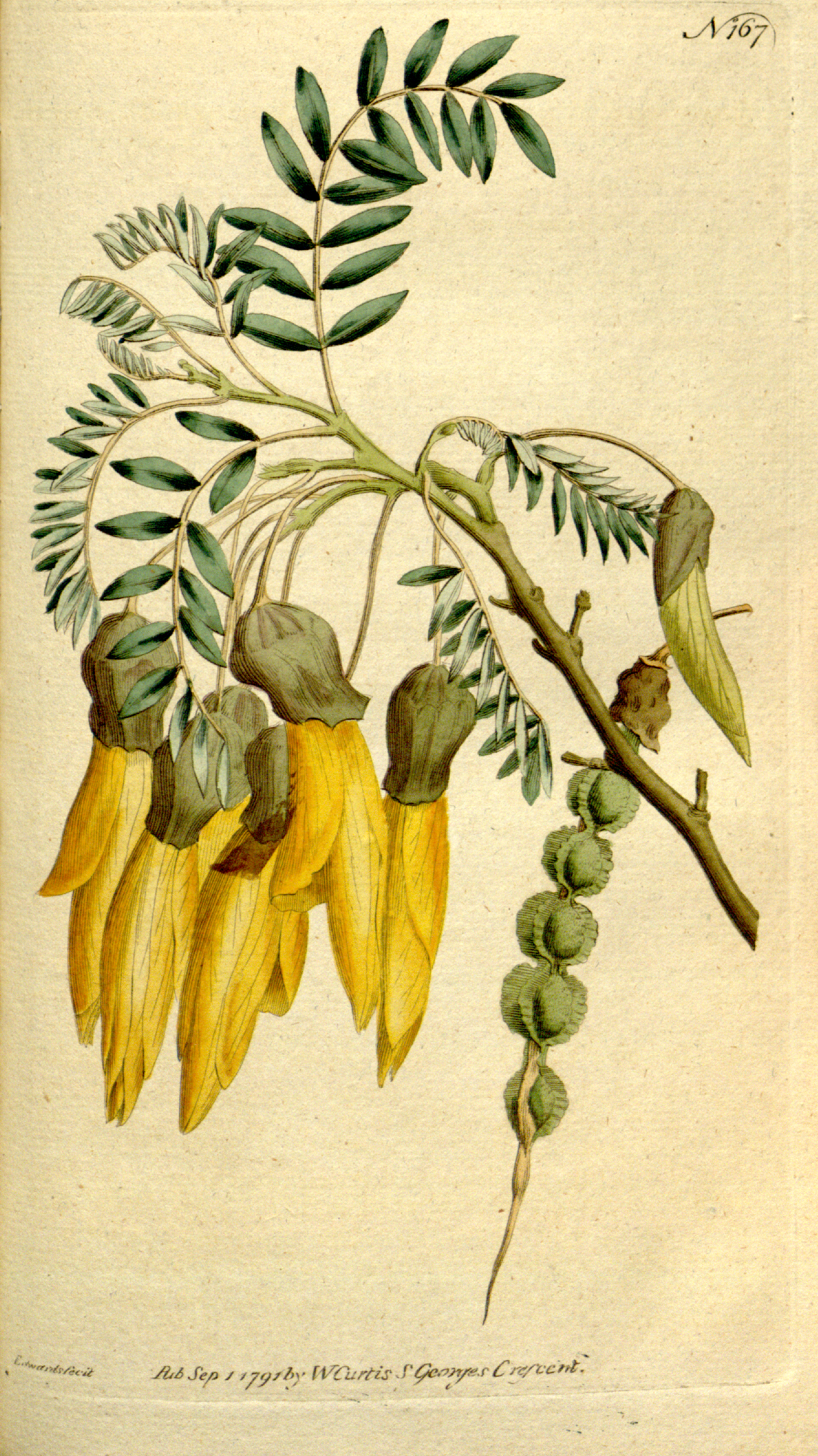

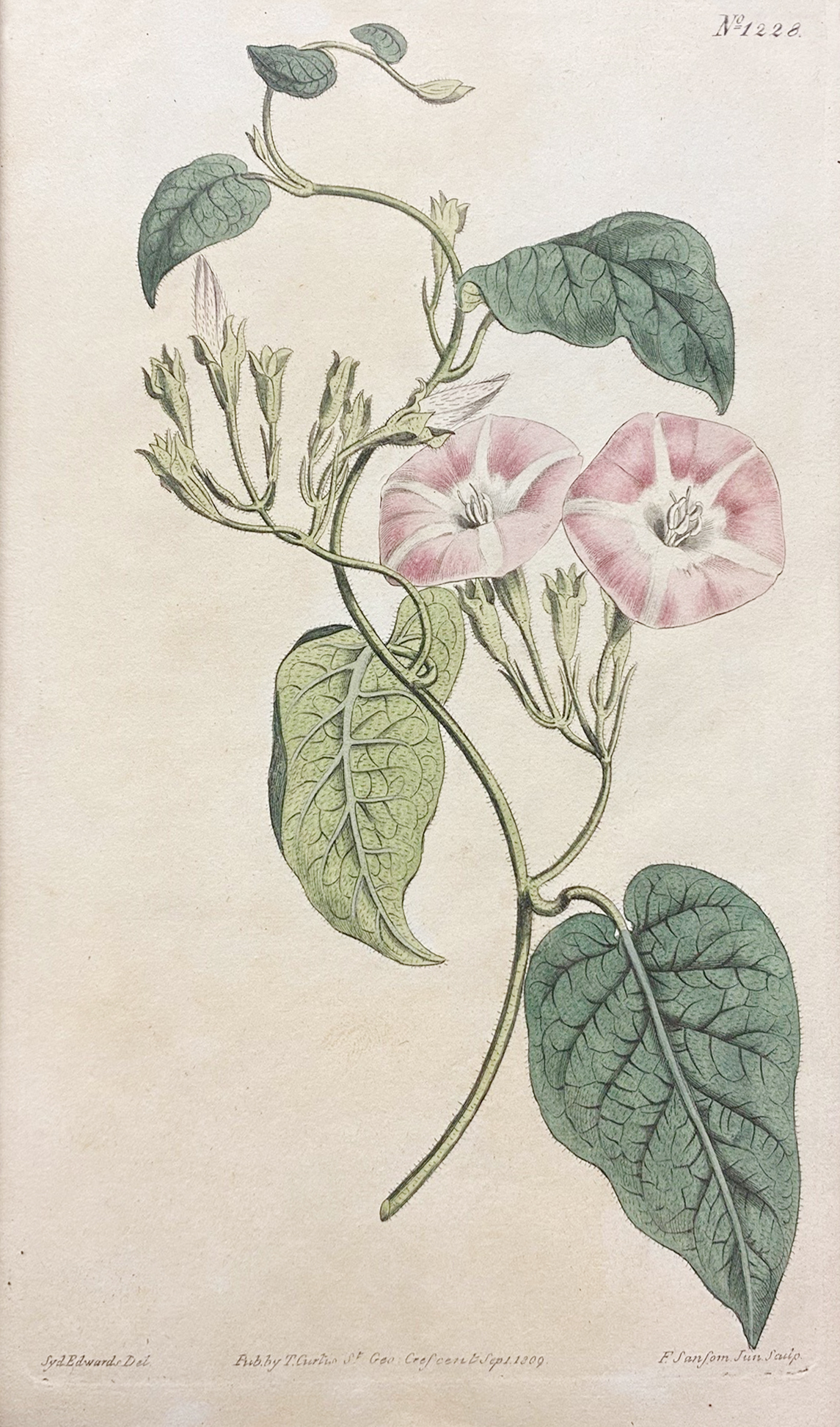

== Bibliography ==
- Davies, Kevin L. (2001). "The life and work of Sydenham Edwards FLS, Welshman, Botanical and Animal Draughtsman 1768-1819". Minerva - The Journal of Swansea History. 9: 30–58.
