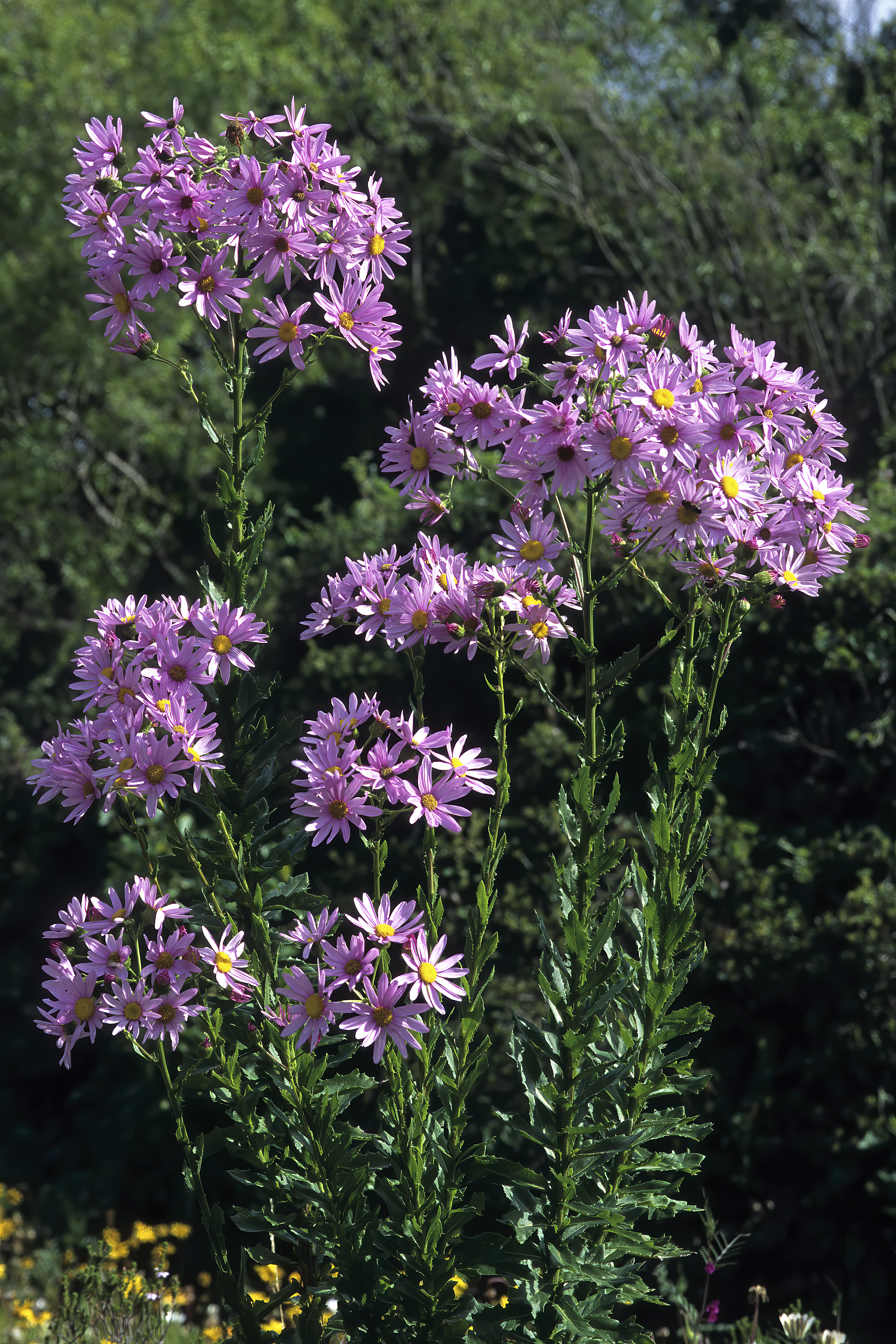
- Photograph by SAplants

Scientific classification
- Kingdom: Plantae
- Clade: Tracheophytes
- Clade: Angiosperms
- Clade: Eudicots
- Clade: Asterids
- Order: Asterales
- Family: Asteraceae
- Genus: Senecio
- Species: S. glastifolius

Binomial name
- Senecio glastifolius L.f. (1782)

Synonyms
- Jacobaea glastifolia Schrank (1822); Senecio serratulifolius Weinm. (1828)

= Senecio glastifolius =

Species of plant

Senecio glastifolius is a flowering plant found throughout the world and native to South Africa. It has a collection of common names throughout the world. The two common names in New Zealand are pink ragwort and holly-leaved senecio. In the UK the most common names are woad leaved ragwort, holly leaved groundsel, and lilac senecio. In South Africa it is called senecio, waterdissel, and water thistle. In the USA it is referred to as lilac–flowered groundsel. Finally, there is the less common name of purple ragwort.

== Description ==
Senecio glastifolius is an upright perennial herbaceous plant in the family Asteraceae. In New Zealand it commonly grows to around 1 meter tall although some individuals in sheltered areas can grow upwards of two meters. The stems of the plant are glabrous (smooth and hairless) and often woody in the lower areas of the plant. The main stem can be 8-12 cm in diameter at the base of larger plants before branching to smaller stems. The stems branch from near the base and are green in colour with red ridges running vertically along the length of the stem.

The leaves are arranged alternately along the stems and appear like the leaf of a holly. They are elliptic (oval-shaped) and bright to deep green in colour with large irregular teeth along the margin of the leaf which gives them a prickly texture. The base of leaves are apetiolate (stalkless) at the base and clasping, wrapping partly around the stem especially in young plants. Leaves range from 3-15cm long and 2-3cm wide; leaves lower on the plant are often larger and more serrated compared to upper leaves which are smaller and less toothed. Leaves are located every 1-2 cm along the stem.

The flowers are grouped into heads called capitula, similar to the flower of a daisy. The heads are arranged in loose, flat-topped clusters called corymbs, which contain 20 – 30 capitula each, with some plants producing several hundred giving a complete covering of flowers over the foliage. Each capitulum is about 40-50mm in diameter and surrounded by a ring of 19-23 bracts, which are small leaf-like structures that protect the flowers. Each bract is 6-9 mm long and tipped with a tiny dark point.

Each capitulum contains two types of flowers: central disk florets which are yellow and 6-8mm long, and outer ray florets, which resemble petals and range from deep pink and purple, to mauve, or white. Most often they are bright pink and 12-25mm long arranged in a ring around the flower head.

The fruit of S. glastifolius is a dry, seed structure known as an achene, which is 2-2.5mm long and dark brown. Achenes from the ray florets are glabrous and those from disc florets are hairy. Each seed is topped with a pappus – a tuft of fine hair-like structure that aids in wind dispersals; each pappus is 7-9mm long and falls off after dispersal.

Senecio glastifolius is sometimes confused with Senecio elegans (which also grows by the coast), but the leaves of the two species are different.

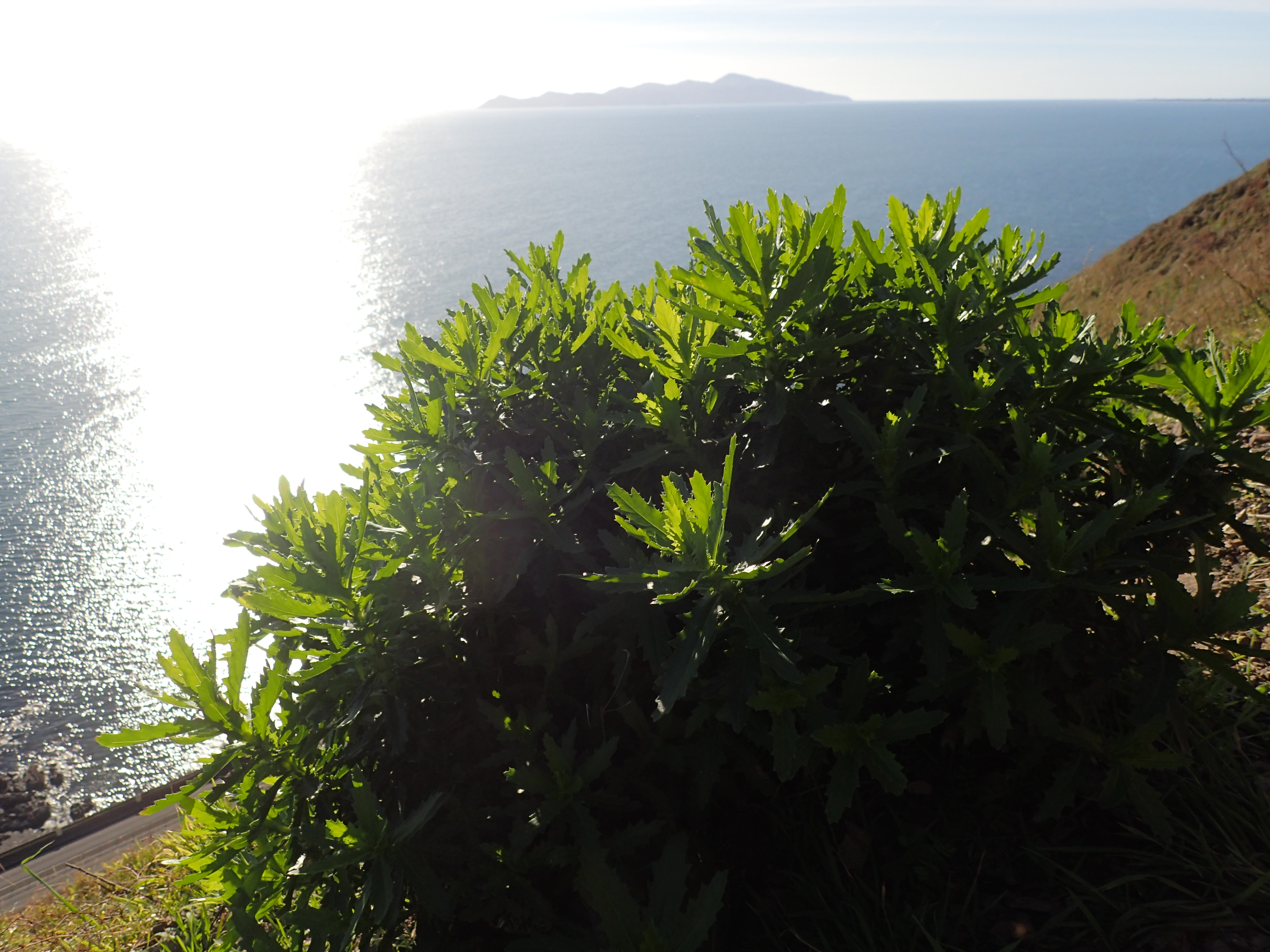
Leaves of Senecio glastifolius, showing the distinctively serrated margins. Photograph by Stephenhartley.

== Range ==
=== Natural global range ===
Senecio glastifolius is native to South Africa's western and eastern Cape Provinces where it occupies a relatively small coastal range. In addition to its native range, it has been introduced throughout many regions including Australia, British Isles, New Zealand, Maderia, France and the USA. In Australia, S.glastifolius is a listed weed on the National Environmental Alert list. In New Zealand it is banned for sale and propagation and is managed as a pest.

=== New Zealand range ===
In New Zealand S.glastifolius was first recorded as naturalised in 1963 near Gisborne. Initially it was of limited concern, but the population expanded significantly in the following 30 years. Today in New Zealand it can be found widely across coastal and lowland areas of the North Island, mainly in the Manawatu and Whanganui region. It is also found in areas of the South Island around Canterbury and Marlborough.

== Habitat ==
It favours a Mediterranean climate, often coastal, and typically colonises disturbed soil. Senecio glastifolius thrives in areas of disturbance and is commonly found in a range of habitats, including coastal dunes, roadside embankments, rocky outcrops, damp areas, shrublands and the open understory of forests. It can quickly establish after disturbances such as fires and clearing of land.

== Ecology ==
=== Life cycle/Phenology ===
Senecio glastifolius is regarded as a short-lived perennial herb. Individual plants can live between 3-5 years although some larger plants in sheltered conditions have survived 10 years potentially meaning S.glastifolius can survive a decade.

Seeds germinate typically within two weeks. Maximum germination occurs when the temperature is warmer than 25 degrees. Germination success tends to be between 53% and 80% and in New Zealand germination has been observed between February and August. Disturbance from fires followed by rain can increase germination of seedlings. Seeds remain in the soil banks for several years and can be released from dormancy by disturbance such as cultivation or fire. In Western Australia the plants have been observed to grow between March and August like New Zealand.

Flowering usually occurs in spring but some plants in New Zealand have been observed to have a second flowering in summer. The capitula of S. glastifolius can produce up to 250 seeds each which are thought to be wind dispersed. Plants after flowering two to three time can become top heavy and break at the stem. Branches can continue to grow after this and there is some evidence of stems lying horizontal and in contact with soil forming new roots.

=== Preferred conditions ===
Senecio glastifolius prefers a warm temperate climate with an average high temperature of more than 10 degrees, and low temperature of above 0. It can tolerate climates that are wet all year and temperate climates with dry summers (Rapson, 2017). It is wind resistant and can grow in full sun to lightly shaded areas. It can be found in a range of altitudes from 18m to 1090m. It can grow in a variety of soil types but it prefers a light texture, neutral soil pH, free drainage but can still tolerate high soil moisture.

=== Predators, Parasites, and Diseases ===
Grazing pressure on S. glastifolius is often low, as the plant becomes unpalatable to livestock once stems become woody and the leaves become prickly in texture. Young plants may be grazed by livestock, so often it establishes in areas with low stocking rate. Research in South Africa suggests the moth Diota rostrata feeds on the plant. In New Zealand the native magpie moth (Nyctemera annulata) larvae are known to feed on the leaves of the plant. The diurnal moth Aglossa cuprealis feeds on its flowers. Chrysanthemum stunt viroid is the only known disease to affect S. glastifolius.

== Economic and Social Benefit ==
In some areas around the world it is sold as an ornamental plant in garden centres, and valued for its beautiful pink flowers.

== Invasive Status ==
It has been known to escape cultivation and become naturalized in areas of appropriate climate. S. glastifolius is considered an invasive species in New Zealand and Australia due to its ability to thrive in a range of habitats and rapidly spread. Detecting it early and removing seedlings is the most successful method of control. Removal of established stands is best done by hand pulling and pesticide.

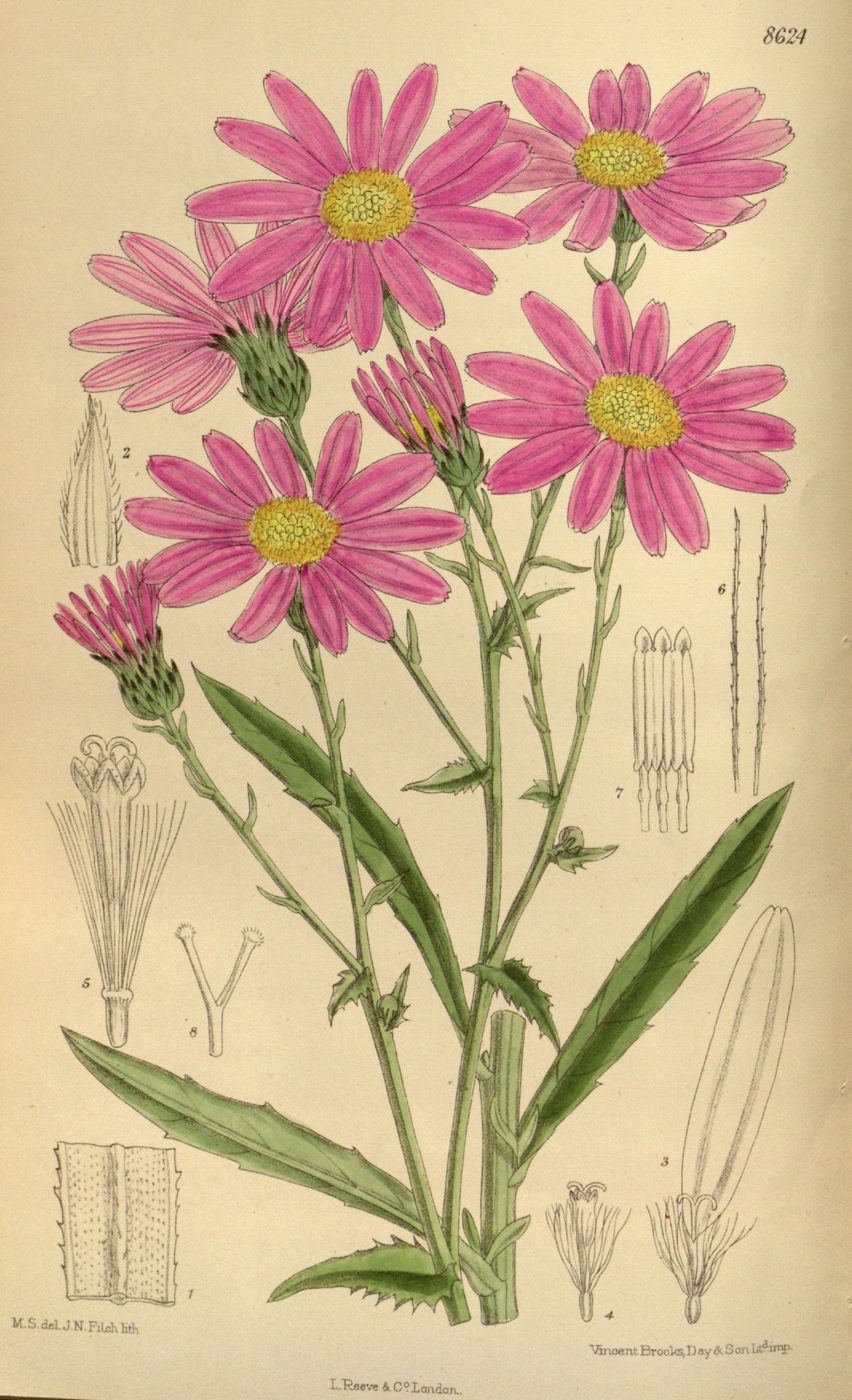
Botanical illustration
