= William Curtis =

British scientist and botanist

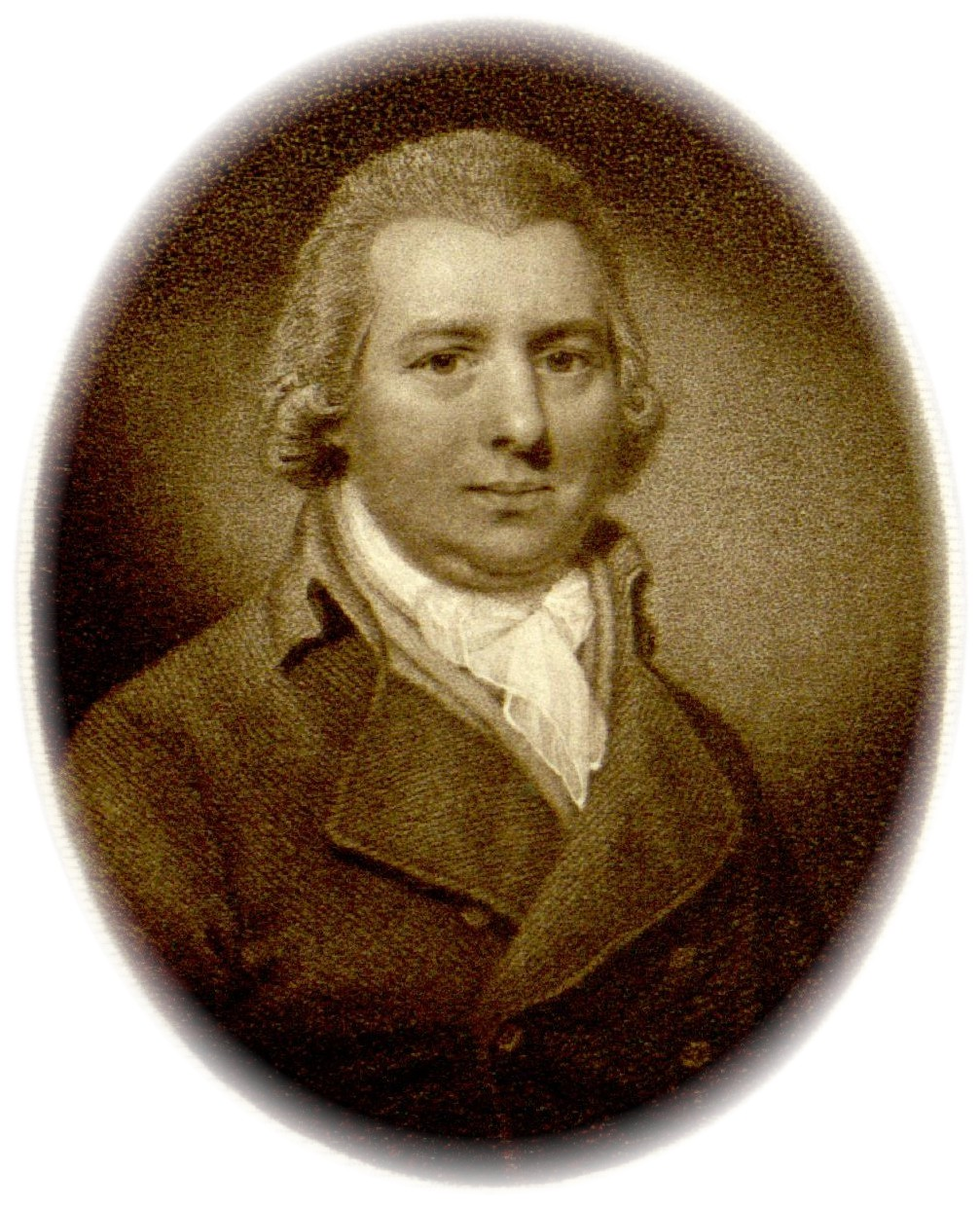
- Portrait from Curtis's Botanical Magazine
- Born: 11 January 1746; Alton, Hampshire, England
- Died: 7 July 1799 (aged 53); Brompton, London, England
- Known for: Curtis's Botanical Magazine, Flora Londinensis
- Scientific career
- Fields: Botany; Entomology
- Workplaces: Chelsea Physic Garden, London
- Author abbrev. (botany): Curtis

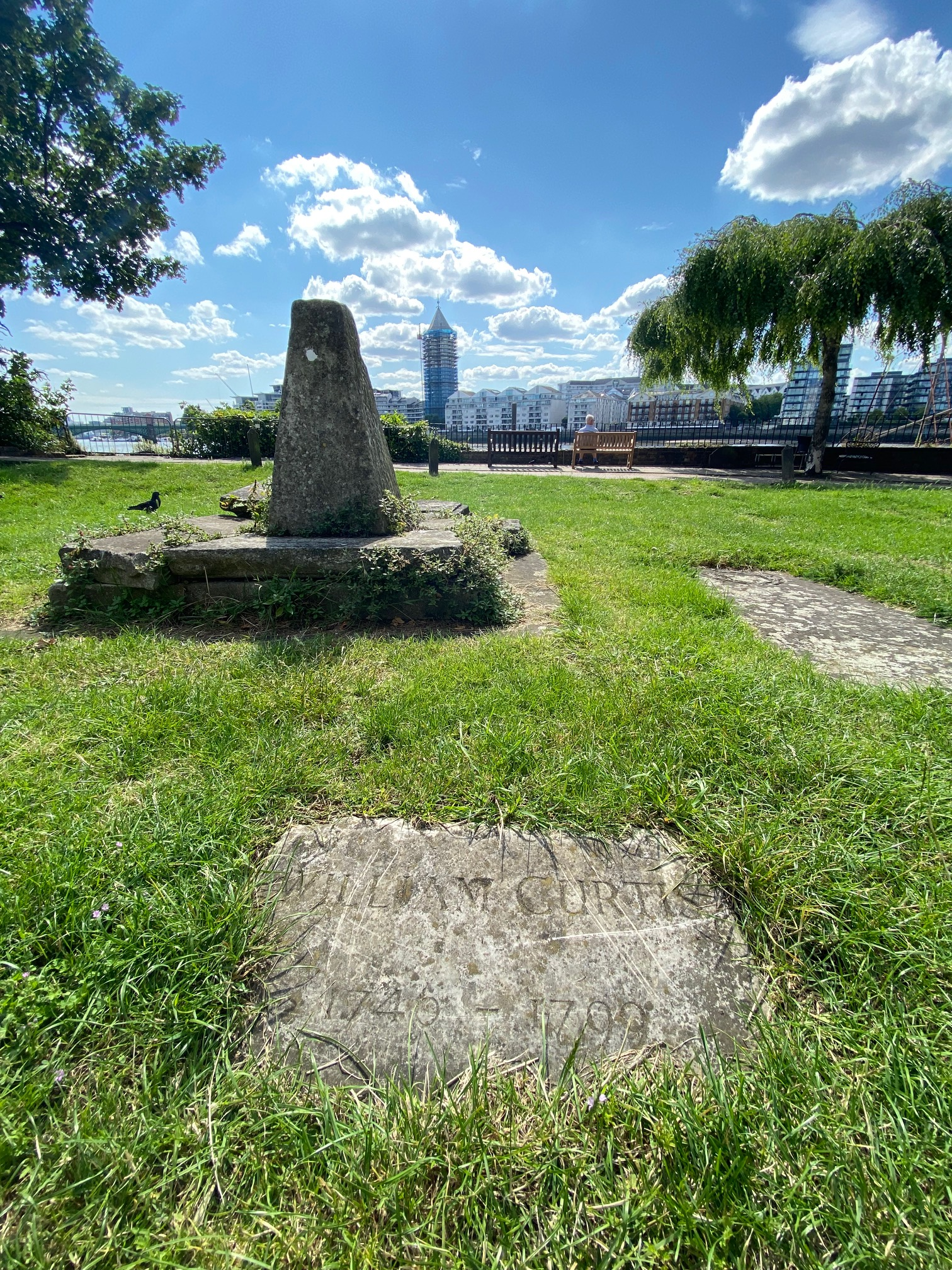
The remains of William Curtis's headstone at St Mary's, Battersea

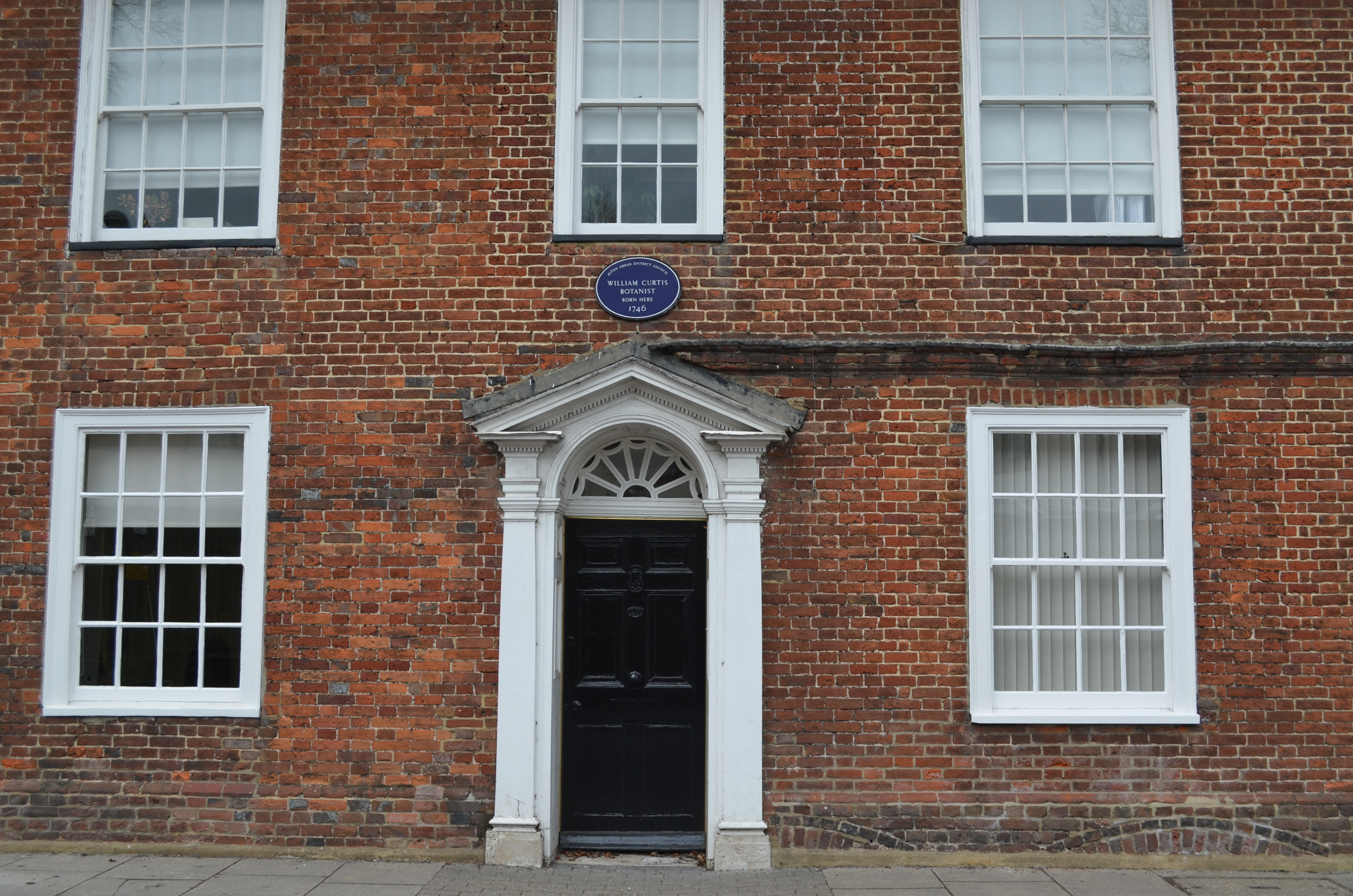
House on Lenten Street, Alton, where Curtis was born

William Curtis (11 January 1746 – 7 July 1799) was an English botanist and entomologist, who was born at Alton, Hampshire, site of the Curtis Museum.

Curtis began as an apothecary, before turning his attention to botany and other natural history. The publications he prepared reached a wider audience than early works on the subject had intended. At the age of 25 he produced Instructions for collecting and preserving insects; particularly moths and butterflies.

Curtis was demonstrator of plants and Praefectus Horti at the Chelsea Physic Garden from 1771 to 1777. He established his own London Botanic Garden at Lambeth in 1779, moving to Brompton in 1789. He published Flora Londinensis (6 volumes, 1777–1798), a pioneering work in that it devoted itself to urban nature. Financial success was not found, but he went on the publish The Botanical Magazine in 1787, a work that would also feature hand coloured plates by artists such as James Sowerby and Sydenham Edwards. (William Kilburn is often erroneously cited as having contributed plates to Curtis's Botanical Magazine. Though he did provide illustrations to Flora Londinensis, his association with Curtis seems to have ended by 1777, 10 years before the first publication of the Botanical Magazine)

Curtis was to gain wealth from the ventures into publishing, short sales on Londinensis were offset by over 3,000 copies of the magazine. Curtis said they had each brought 'pudding or praise'.

Curtis might be the editor of an exsiccata-like series Hortus siccus gramineus, followed up by the series Hortus siccus gramineus or a collection of dried specimens of British grasses with their Latin and English names... (1802-1806), distributed by William Salisbury.

The genus Curtisia is named in his honour. His publication was continued as the esteemed botanical publication, Curtis's Botanical Magazine. The noted natural history illustrators, James Sowerby and Sydenham Edwards both found a start with the eminent magazine.

He was buried in the churchyard at St. Mary's Church, Battersea at a location he chose himself, where he is commemorated in a stained glass window, as many of his samples were collected from the churchyard there. His headstone, now only partially remaining, had the epitaph:

While living herbs shall spring profusely wild,

Or gardens cherish all that's blithe and gay,
So long thy works shall please, dear Nature's child,
So long thy mem'ry suffer no decay.

The epitaph, although lost from the grave is included in the stained glass window by John Hayward. The window design includes a chaplet of flowers from Curtis's Flora Londinensis.

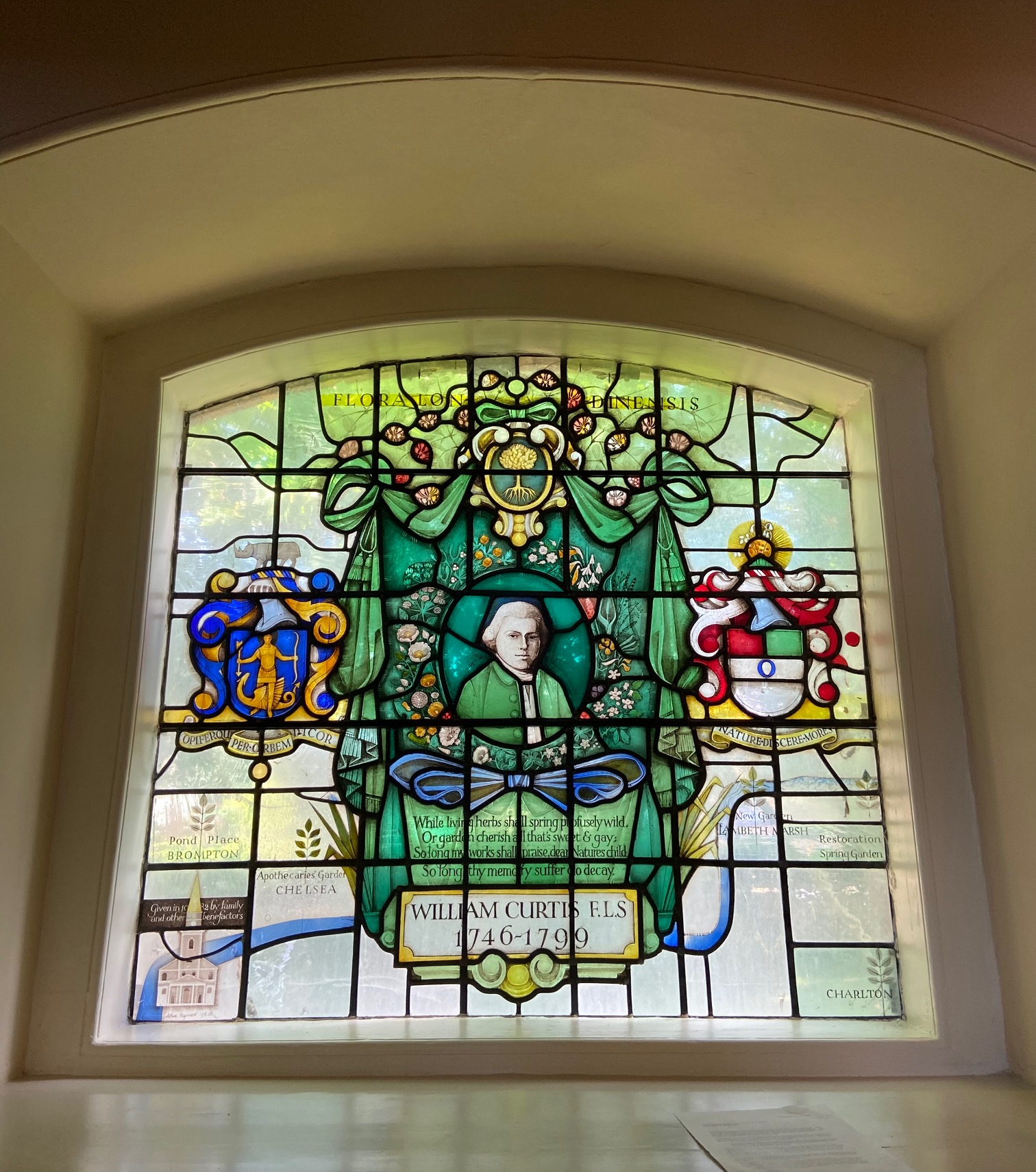
The commemorative stained glass window by John Hayward at St Mary's, Battersea

This botanist is denoted by the author abbreviation Curtis when citing a botanical name.
