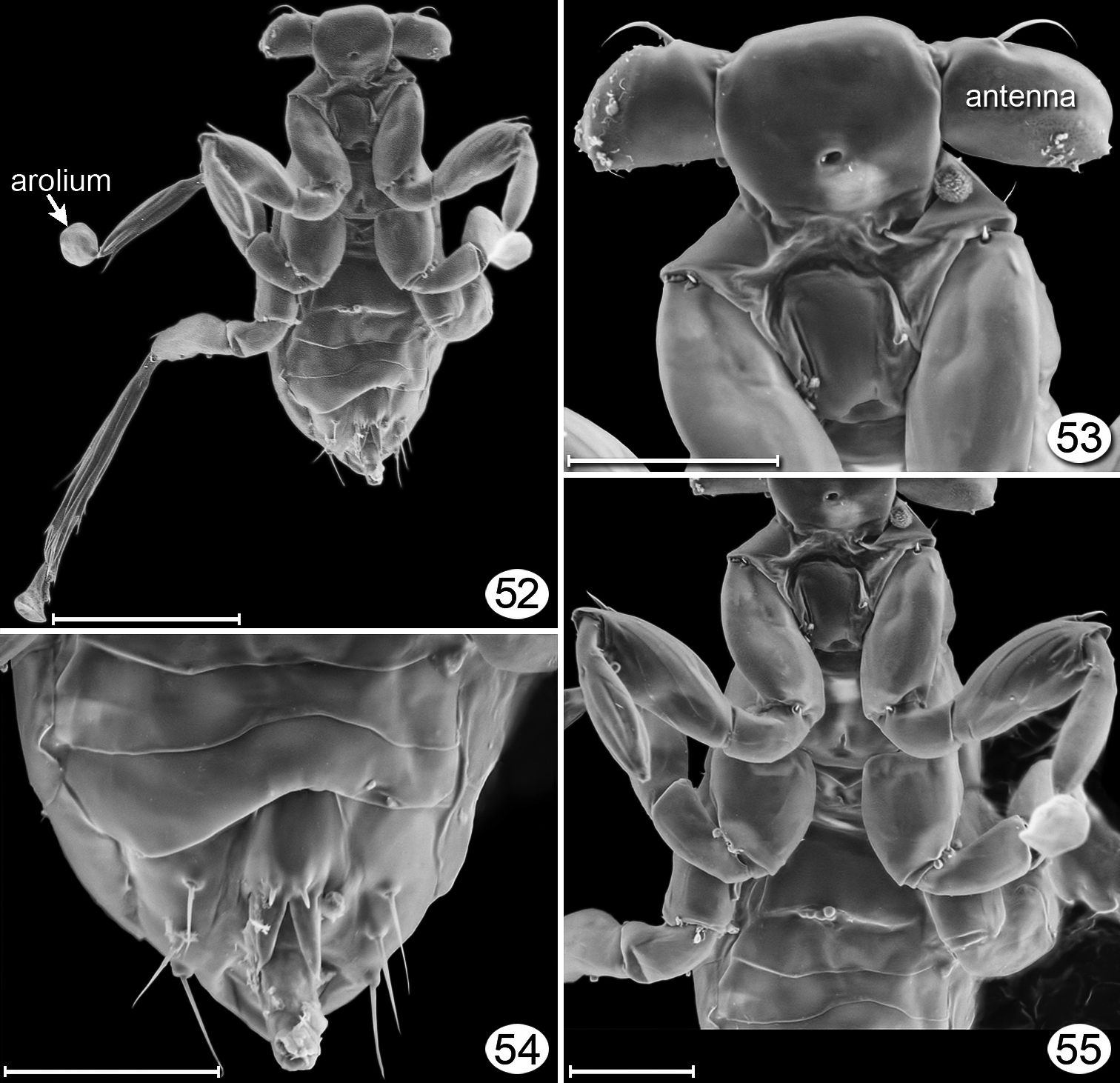
- Dicopomorpha echmepterygis male, paratype, ventral. 52 habitus 53 head + prothorax + procoxa 54 apex of gaster 55 mesosoma + base of most legs and metasoma. Scale line = 20 μm, except Fig. 52 = 50 μm.

Scientific classification
- Domain: Eukaryota
- Kingdom: Animalia
- Phylum: Arthropoda
- Class: Insecta
- Order: Hymenoptera
- Family: Mymaridae
- Genus: Dicopomorpha; Ogloblin, 1955

Species
- Dicopomorpha albithorax; Dicopomorpha echmepterygis; Dicopomorpha funiculata; Dicopomorpha heratyi; Dicopomorpha koreana; Dicopomorpha liaoningensis; Dicopomorpha macrocephala; Dicopomorpha maximus; Dicopomorpha mirzai; Dicopomorpha pulchricornis; Dicopomorpha schleideni; Dicopomorpha stramineus; Dicopomorpha victoria; Dicopomorpha zebra

= Dicopomorpha =

Genus of wasps

Dicopomorpha is a wasp genus in the family Mymaridae.
