= Dicopomorpha zebra =

Scientific classification
- Domain: Eukaryota
- Kingdom: Animalia
- Phylum: Arthropoda
- Class: Insecta
- Order: Hymenoptera
- Family: Mymaridae
- Genus: Dicopomorpha
- Species: D. zebra

Binomial name
- Dicopomorpha zebra Huber, 2009

Species of insect

Dicopomorpha zebra is a species of fairyfly within the family Mymaridae. The species distribution is in the Afrotropical regions of Gabon, Ivory Coast, and Nigeria.
