= List of Hymenoptera of New Zealand =

List of Species

A list of the Hymenoptera species in New Zealand, both native and introduced. Hymenoptera consists of ants, bees, sawflies and wasps.

== Agaonidae ==
Eupristina verticillata Waterston, 1921; Accidental Introduction

Pleistodontes froggatti Mayr 1906; Accidental Introduction

Pleistodontes imperialis Saunders 1883; Accidental Introduction

== Aphelinidae ==
Aphelinus abdominalis (Dalman 1820); Accidental Introduction

Aphelinus mali (Haldeman 1851); Deliberate Introduction

Aphelinus humilis Mercet 1928; Accidental Introduction

Aphelinus gossypii Timberlake 1924; Accidental Introduction

Aphelinus asychis Walker 1839; Accidental Introduction

Aphelinus subflavescens (Westwood 1837); Deliberate Introduction

Aphytis ignotus Compere 1955; Accidental Introduction

Aphytis diaspidis (Howard 1881); Accidental Introduction

Aphytis chilensis Howard 1900; Accidental Introduction

Aphytis mytilaspidis (Le Baron 1870); Accidental Introduction

Aphytis chrysomphali (Mercet 1912); Accidental Introduction

Cales berryi Mottern & Heraty 2011; Endemic

Centrodora xiphidii (Perkins 1906); Accidental Introduction

Coccophagoides

Centrodora scolypopae Valentine 1966; Accidental Introduction

Coccophagus gurneyi Compere 1929; Deliberate Introduction

Coccophagus scutellaris (Dalman 1825); Accidental Introduction

Coccophagus ochraceus Howard 1895; Deliberate Introduction

Coccophagus philippiae (Silvestri 1915); Accidental Introduction

Encarsia citrina (Craw 1891); Accidental Introduction

Encarsia formosa Gahan 1924; Deliberate Introduction

Encarsia pergandiella Howard 1907; Accidental Introduction

Encarsia koebelei (Howard 1908); Accidental Introduction

Encarsia perniciosi (Tower 1913); Accidental Introduction

Encarsia inaron (Walker 1839); Accidental Introduction

Eretmocerus warrae Naumann & Schmidt 2000; Accidental Introduction

Euryischia

Eutrichosomella

Pteroptrix

== Apidae ==
Apis mellifera Linnaeus 1758; Deliberate Introduction

Bombus hortorum (Linnaeus 1761); Deliberate Introduction

Bombus ruderatus (Fabricius 1775); Deliberate Introduction

Bombus subterraneus (Linnaeus 1758); Deliberate Introduction

Bombus terrestris (Linnaeus 1758); Deliberate Introduction

== Bembicidae ==
Argogorytes carbonarius (Smith 1856); Endemic

== Bethylidae ==
Apenesia harrisi Ward 2013; Endemic

Austranesia tofti (Ward 2013); Endemic

Cephalonomia pinkfloydi Ward 2013; Endemic

Chilepyris platythelys Sorg & Walker 1989; Accidental Introduction

Epyris tricristata (Ward 2013); Endemic

Eupsenella insulana Gordh & Harris 1996; Endemic

Goniozus jacintae Farrugia 1981; Accidental Introduction

Goniozus musae Ward 2013; Endemic

Laelius macfarlanei Ward 2013; Endemic

Parascleroderma azevedonis Ward 2013; Endemic

Plastanoxus laevis (Ashmead 1893); Accidental Introduction

Pseudisobrachium beggsae (Ward 2013); Endemic

Sclerodermus niveifemur (Evans 1964); Accidental Introduction

Sierola berryae Ward 2013; Endemic

Sierola gilbertae Ward 2013; Endemic

Sierola houdiniae Magnacca 2019; Endemic

Sierola jamiei (Ward 2013); Endemic

Sierola lucyae Ward 2013; Endemic

Sierola thorpei Magnacca 2019; Accidental Introduction

Sierola vibrissata Ward 2013; Endemic

== Braconidae ==
Aerophilus

Aleiodes masneri (van Achterberg 1995); Endemic

Aleiodes gressitti (Muesebeck 1964); Endemic

Aleiodes declanae van Achterberg 2004; Endemic

Alysia manducator (Panzer 1799); Deliberate Introduction

Apanteles subandinus Blanchard 1947; Deliberate Introduction

Apanteles carpatus (Say 1836); Accidental Introduction

Apanteles galleriae Wilkinson 1932; Accidental Introduction

Aphaereta aotea Hughes & Woolcock 1976; Endemic

Aphaereta pallipes (Say 1829); Accidental Introduction

Aphidius rhopalosiphi De Stefani Perez 1902; Deliberate Introduction

Aphidius ervi Haliday 1834; Deliberate Introduction

Aphidius matricariae Haliday, 1834; Accidental Introduction

Aphidius salicis Haliday 1834; Accidental Introduction

Aphidius sonchi Marshall 1896; Accidental Introduction

Aphidius pelargonii Stary & Carver 1980; Accidental Introduction

Aphidius similis Stary & Carver 1980; Accidental Introduction

Aphidius eadyi Stary, Gonzalez, Hall 1980; Deliberate Introduction

Aphidius colemani Viereck 1912; Accidental Introduction

Aridelus rufotestaceus Tobias 1986; Accidental Introduction

Ascogaster crenulata Cameron 1898; Endemic

Ascogaster elongata Lyle 1923; Endemic

Ascogaster bicolorata Walker & Huddleston 1987; Endemic

Ascogaster erroli Walker & Huddleston 1987; Endemic

Ascogaster gourlayi Walker & Huddleston 1987; Endemic

Ascogaster iti Walker & Huddleston 1987; Endemic

Ascogaster mayae Walker & Huddleston 1987; Endemic

Ascogaster parrotti Walker & Huddleston 1987; Endemic

Ascogaster strigosa Walker & Huddleston 1987; Endemic

Ascogaster tekapoense Walker & Huddleston 1987; Endemic

Ascogaster vexator Walker & Huddleston 1987; Endemic

Ascogaster quadridentata Wesmael 1835; Deliberate Introduction

Asobara antipoda Ashmead 1900; Endemic

Asobara ajbelli Berry 2007; Endemic

Asobara albiclava Berry 2007; Endemic

Asobara tabida (Nees 1834); Accidental Introduction

Asobara persimilis (Papp 1977); Accidental Introduction

Aspicolpus penetrator (Smith 1878); Endemic

Aspicolpus hudsoni Turner 1922; Endemic

Aspigonus antipodum (Turner 1922); Endemic

Aspilota albertica Berry 2007; Endemic

Aspilota angusta Berry 2007; Endemic

Aspilota parecur Berry 2007; Endemic

Aspilota villosa Berry 2007; Endemic

Aspilota andyaustini Wharton 2002; Native

Austrohormius punctatus van Achterberg 1995; Endemic

Bracon phylacteophagus Austin 1989; Deliberate Introduction

Bracon variegator Spinola 1808; Deliberate Introduction

Caenophanes

Chaenusa helmorei Berry 2007; Endemic

Choeras helespas Walker 1996; Endemic

Chorebus paranigricapitis Berry 2007; Endemic

Chorebus rodericki Berry 2007; Endemic

Chorebus thorpei Berry 2007; Endemic

Choreopraon totarae Mackauer 2012; Endemic

Chremylus elaphus Haliday 1833; Accidental Introduction

Cotesia urabae Austin & Allen 1989; Deliberate Introduction

Cotesia ruficrus (Haliday 1834); Accidental Introduction

Cotesia glomerata (Linnaeus 1758); Deliberate Introduction

Cotesia rubecula (Marshall 1885); Deliberate Introduction

Cotesia kazak (Telenga 1949); Deliberate Introduction

Cryptoxilos thorpei Shaw & Berry 2005; Endemic

Dacnusa areolaris (Nees 1811); Accidental Introduction

Dendrosotinus chathamicus Belokobylskij & Austin 2013; Endemic

Diaeretiella rapae (McIntosh 1855); Accidental Introduction

Dinocampus coccinellae (Schrank 1802); Accidental Introduction

Dinotrema barrattae Berry 2007; Endemic

Dinotrema longworthi Berry 2007; Endemic

Dinotrema philipi Berry 2007; Endemic

Diolcogaster perniciosus (Wilkinson 1929); Endemic

Diospilus stramineipes (Cameron 1898); Endemic

Distatrix

Dolichogenidea tasmanica (Cameron 1912); Accidental Introduction

Dolichogenidea carposinae (Wilkinson 1938); Endemic

Doryctomorpha antipoda Ashmead 1900; Endemic

Doryctopsis neozealandicus (Belokobylskij, Iqbal, Austin 2004); Endemic

Eadys paropsidis Huddleston & Short 1978; Deliberate Introduction

Ephedrus plagiator (Nees 1811); Deliberate Introduction

Epigeiobracon perplexus Quicke & Ward 2019; Endemic

Fopius carpocapsae (Ashmead 1900); Not present?

Glyptapanteles aucklandensis (Cameron 1909); Endemic

Habrobracon hebetor (Say 1836); Accidental Introduction

Kauriphanes khalaimi Belokobylskij & Zaldívar 2012; Endemic

Kiwigaster variabilis Fernandez-Triana and Ward 2011; Endemic

Leiophron

Lysiphlebus testaceipes (Cresson 1880); Accidental Introduction

Macrocentrus rubromaculatus (Cameron 1901); Native

Metaspathius hemipterus Belokobylskij 2019; Endemic

Metaspathius apterus Brues 1922; Endemic

Metaspathius sharkeyi Quicke & Butcher 2019; Endemic

Metaspathius gorgasoma Quicke & Ward 2019; Endemic

Metaspathius chathamicus Ward 2019; Endemic

Metaspathius kuschelli Ward & Belokobylskij 2019; Endemic

Meteorus orocrambivorus Aguirre & Shaw 2014; Endemic

Meteorus novazealandicus Cameron 1898; Endemic

Meteorus luteus (Cameron 1911); Native

Meteorus annetteae Huddleston 1986; Endemic

Meteorus cobbus Huddleston 1986; Endemic

Meteorus quinlani Huddleston 1986; Endemic

Meteorus cinctellus (Spinola 1808); Accidental Introduction

Meteorus cespitator (Thunberg 1822); Accidental Introduction

Meteorus pulchricornis (Wesmael 1835); Accidental Introduction

Microctonus hyperodae Loan 1974; Deliberate Introduction

Microctonus aethiopoides Loan 1975; Deliberate Introduction

Microctonus alpinus Shaw 1993; Endemic

Microctonus falcatus Shaw 1993; Endemic

Microctonus zealandicus Shaw 1993; Endemic

Microplitis croceipes (Cresson 1872); Deliberate Introduction

Monolexis fuscicornis Förster 1862; Accidental Introduction

Neptihormius herbaspicatum Quicke & Ward 2019; Endemic

Neptihormius whakapapa Quicke & Ward 2019; Endemic

Neptihormius dipterophagus Quicke, Ward & van Achterberg 2019; Endemic

Neptihormius stigmellae van Achterberg & Berry 2004; Endemic

Notogaster avilai Fernandez-Triana & Ward 2020; Endemic

Notogaster charlesi Fernandez-Triana & Ward 2020; Endemic

Notogaster macdonaldae Fernandez-Triana & Ward 2020; Endemic

Notogaster martini Fernandez-Triana & Ward 2020; Endemic

Notogaster poultonae Fernandez-Triana & Ward 2020; Endemic

Notogaster sucklingi Fernandez-Triana & Ward 2020; Endemic

Notogaster toddae Fernandez-Triana & Ward 2020; Endemic

Notogaster walkeri Fernandez-Triana & Ward 2020; Endemic

Notogaster withersae Fernandez-Triana & Ward 2020; Endemic

Notogaster wornerae Fernandez-Triana & Ward 2020; Endemic

Ontsira antica (Wollaston 1858); Accidental Introduction

Opius cinerariae Fischer 1963; Accidental Introduction

Parallorhogas pallidiceps (Perkins 1910); Accidental Introduction

Pauesia nigrovaria (Provancher, 1888); Deliberate Introduction

Pholetesor; Deliberate Introduction

Pronkia antefurcalis van Achterberg 1990; Endemic

Protapanteles

Pseudochremylus angulifer van Achterberg 2005; Accidental Introduction

Pseudosyngaster pallidus (Gourlay 1928); Endemic

Rasivalva

Rhyssaloides maculatus Belokobylskij & Ward 2022; Endemic

Rhyssaloides noyesi Belokobylskij & Ward 2022; Endemic

Rhyssaloides ambeodonti (Muesebeck 1941); Endemic

Sathon

Schauinslandia alfkenii Ashmead 1900; Endemic

Schauinslandia femorata Ashmead 1900; Endemic

Schauinslandia pallidipes Ashmead 1900; Endemic

Schizoprymnus

Shireplitis bilboi Fernandez-Triana & Ward 2013; Endemic

Shireplitis frodoi Fernandez-Triana & Ward 2013; Endemic

Shireplitis meriadoci Fernandez-Triana & Ward 2013; Endemic

Shireplitis peregrini Fernandez-Triana & Ward 2013; Endemic

Shireplitis samwisei Fernandez-Triana & Ward 2013; Endemic

Shireplitis tolkieni Fernandez-Triana & Ward 2013; Endemic

Spathius thorpei Belokobylskij & Austin 2013; Endemic

Syntretus

Taphaeus

Therophilus

Spathius exarator (Linnaeus 1758); Accidental Introduction

Spathius pedestris Wesmael 1838; Accidental Introduction

Trioxys sunnysidensis Fulbright & Pike 2007; Accidental Introduction

Trioxys complanatus Quilis 1931; Deliberate Introduction

Venanides demeter (Wilkinson 1934); Endemic

Xynobius albobasalis van Achterberg 2004; Endemic

Xynobius granulatus van Achterberg 2004; Endemic

Zeachremylus wardi Belokobylskij 2019; Endemic

Zealastoa hirta Belokobylskij, Quicke & Ward 2020; Endemic

Zealastoa multiarticulata Belokobylskij, Quicke & Ward 2020; Endemic

Zealastoa waitakerensis Quicke & Ward 2020; Endemic

== Ceraphronidae ==
Aphanogmus; Native

Ceraphron; Native

Antrocephalus

== Chalcididae ==
Brachymeria phya (Walker 1838); Deliberate Introduction

Brachymeria teuta (Walker 1841); Deliberate Introduction

Proconura

Pseudepitelia rubrifemur (Girault 1913); Accidental Introduction

== Colletidae ==
Euryglossina hypochroma Cockerell 1916; Accidental Introduction

Euryglossina proctotrypoides Cockerell 1913; Accidental Introduction

Hylaeus agilis (Smith 1876); Endemic

Hylaeus asperithorax (Rayment 1927); Accidental Introduction

Hylaeus capitosus (Smith 1876); Endemic

Hylaeus euxanthus (Cockerell, 1910); Accidental Introduction

Hylaeus kermadecensis Donovan 2007; Endemic

Hylaeus matamoko Donovan 2007; Endemic

Hylaeus murihiku Donovan 2007; Endemic

Hylaeus perhumilis (Cockerell 1914); Accidental Introduction

Hylaeus relegatus (Smith 1876); Endemic

Hyleoides concinna (Fabricius 1775); Accidental Introduction

Leioproctus barrydonovani Engel & Kaulfuss 2025; Fossil

Leioproctus boltoni Cockerell 1904; Endemic

Leioproctus huakiwi Donovan 2007; Endemic

Leioproctus hukarere Donovan 2016; Endemic

Leioproctus imitatus Smith 1853; Endemic

Leioproctus kanapuu Donovan 2007; Endemic

Leioproctus keehua Donovan 2007; Endemic

Leioproctus metallicus (Smith 1853); Endemic

Leioproctus pango Donovan 2007; Endemic

Leioproctus purpureus (Smith 1853); Endemic

Leioproctus vestitus (Smith 1876); Endemic

Leioproctus waipounamu Donovan 2007; Endemic

Nesocolletes fulvescens (Smith 1876); Endemic

Nesocolletes hudsoni (Cockerell 1925); Endemic

Nesocolletes maritimus (Cockerell 1936); Endemic

Nesocolletes monticola (Cockerell 1925); Endemic

Nesocolletes nunui Donovan 2007; Endemic

Nesocolletes paahaumaa Donovan 2007; Endemic

Nesocolletes pekanui Donovan 2007; Endemic

== Crabronidae ==
Ectemnius continuus (Fabricius, 1804); Accidental Introduction

Pison marginatum Smith 1856; Accidental Introduction

Pison morosum Smith 1856; Endemic

Pison peletieri Le Guillou 1841; Accidental Introduction

Pison spinolae Shuckard 1838; Accidental Introduction

Podagritus albipes (Smith 1878); Endemic

Podagritus carbonicolor (Dalla Torre 1897); Endemic

Podagritus chambersi Harris 1994; Endemic

Podagritus cora (Cameron 1888); Endemic

Podagritus digyalos Harris 1994; Endemic

Podagritus parrotti (Leclercq 1955); Endemic

Rhopalum aucklandi Leclercq 1955; Endemic

Rhopalum perforator Smith 1876; Endemic

Rhopalum zelandum Leclercq 1955; Endemic

Tachysphex nigerrimus (Smith 1856); Endemic

== Cynipidae ==
Aulacidea subterminalis Niblett 1946; Deliberate Introduction

Callirhytis erythrocephala (Giraud, 1859); Accidental Introduction

Phanacis hypochoeridis (Kieffer 1887); Accidental Introduction

== Diapriidae ==
Archaeopria eriodes Naumann 1988; Endemic

Archaeopria pelor Naumann 1988; Endemic

Archaeopria pristina Naumann 1988; Endemic

Basalys

Betyla fulva Cameron 1889; Endemic

Betyla auriger Naumann 1988; Endemic

Betyla eupepla Naumann 1988; Endemic

Betyla karamea Naumann 1988; Endemic

Betyla midas Naumann 1988; Endemic

Betyla paparoa Naumann 1988; Endemic

Betyla prosedera Naumann 1988; Endemic

Betyla rangatira Naumann 1988; Endemic

Betyla thegalea Naumann 1988; Endemic

Betyla tuatara Naumann 1988; Endemic

Betyla wahine Naumann 1988; Endemic

Camptopsilus

Cardiopria

Diapria

Diphoropria kuscheli Naumann 1988; Endemic

Diphoropria sinuosa Naumann 1988; Endemic

Entomacis subaptera Early 1980; Endemic

Gladicauda aucklandica Early 1980; Endemic

Hemilexomyia

Hemilexomyia spinosa Early 1980; Endemic

Idiotypa

Maoripria annettae Naumann 1988; Endemic

Maoripria earlyi Naumann 1988; Endemic

Maoripria masneri Naumann 1988; Endemic

Maoripria verticillata Naumann 1988; Endemic

Neurogalesus carinatus Kieffer 1907; Accidental Introduction

Neurogalesus militis Osborn, Forteath, Holloway 1973; Accidental Introduction

Pantolytomyia flocculosa Naumann 1988; Endemic

Pantolytomyia insularis Naumann 1988; Endemic

Pantolytomyia polita Naumann 1988; Endemic

Pantolytomyia takere Naumann 1988; Endemic

Pantolytomyia taurangi Naumann 1988; Endemic

Pantolytomyia tungane Naumann 1988; Endemic

Pantolytomyia wairua Naumann 1988; Endemic

Parabetyla spinosa Brues 1922; Endemic

Parabetyla nauhea Naumann 1988; Endemic

Parabetyla ngarara Naumann 1988; Endemic

Parabetyla pipira Naumann 1988; Endemic

Parabetyla pokorua Naumann 1988; Endemic

Parabetyla tahi Naumann 1988; Endemic

Parabetyla tika Naumann 1988; Endemic

Paramesius

Pentapria

Probetyla subaptera Brues 1922; Endemic

Spilomicrus barnesi Early & Horning 1978; Endemic

Spilomicrus campbellanus (Yoshimoto 1964); Endemic

Spilomicrus carolae Early 1980; Endemic

Spilomicrus coelopae (Early 1978;) Endemic

Spilomicrus diomedeae (Early 1978); Endemic

Spilomicrus helosciomyzae (Early & Horning 1978); Endemic

Spilomicrus insulae (Early 1980); Endemic

Spilomicrus latigaster (Brues 1920); Endemic

Spilomicrus pilgrimi Early 1978; Endemic

Spilomicrus punctatus (Cameron 1889); Endemic

Spilomicrus quadriceps Smith 1878; Endemic

Spilomicrus rekohua (Early 1978); Endemic

Stylaclista quasimodo Early 1980; Endemic

Synacra

Trichopria

Tropidopsilus

Zealaptera chambersi Naumann 1988; Endemic

== Dryinidae ==
Anteon bribianum Olmi 1987; Native

Anteon caledonianum Olmi 1984; Native

Bocchus thorpei Olmi 2007; Accidental Introduction

Dryinus koebelei (Perkins 1905); Endemic

Gonatopus alpinus (Gourlay 1954); Endemic

Gonatopus zealandicus Olmi 1984; Endemic

== Embolemidae ==
Embolemus zealandicus Olmi 1996; Endemic

== Encyrtidae ==
Acerophagus maculipennis (Mercet 1923); Deliberate Introduction

Adelencyrtoides acutus Noyes 1988; Endemic

Adelencyrtoides blastothrichus Noyes 1988; Endemic

Adelencyrtoides inconstans Noyes 1988; Endemic

Adelencyrtoides mucro Noyes 1988; Endemic

Adelencyrtoides otago Noyes 1988; Endemic

Adelencyrtoides palustris Noyes 1988; Endemic

Adelencyrtoides pilosus Noyes 1988; Endemic

Adelencyrtoides proximus Noyes 1988; Endemic

Adelencyrtoides similis Noyes 1988; Endemic

Adelencyrtoides suavis Noyes 1988; Endemic

Adelencyrtoides tridens Noyes 1988; Endemic

Adelencyrtoides unicolor Noyes 1988; Endemic

Adelencyrtoides variabilis Noyes 1988; Endemic

Adelencyrtoides novaezealandiae Tachikawa & Valentine 1969; Endemic

Adelencyrtus aulacaspidis (Brethes 1914); Accidental Introduction

Alamella mira Noyes 1988; Accidental Introduction

Anagyrus fusciventris (Girault 1915); Accidental Introduction

Anagyrus costalis (Noyes 1988); Endemic

Anagyrus cyrenis (Noyes 1988); Endemic

Anagyrus regis (Noyes 1988); Endemic

Arrhenophagoidea coloripes Girault 1915; Accidental Introduction

Arrhenophagus chionaspidis Aurivillius 1888; Accidental Introduction

Austrochoreia antipodis Noyes 1988; Endemic

Baeoanusia albifunicle Girault, 1932; Accidental Introduction

Cheiloneurus antipodis Noyes 1988; Endemic

Cheiloneurus gonatopodis Perkins 1906; Native

Cheiloneurus flaccus (Walker 1847); Accidental Introduction

Coccidoctonus dubius (Girault 1915); Deliberate Introduction

Coccidoctonus psyllae (Riek 1962); Accidental Introduction

Coelopencyrtus australis Noyes 1988; Endemic

Coelopencyrtus maori Noyes 1988; Endemic

Copidosoma floridanum (Ashmead 1900); Deliberate Introduction

Copidosoma exvallis Noyes 1988; Endemic

Cryptanusia aureiscutellum (Girault, 1926); Accidental Introduction

Encyrtus infelix (Embleton 1902); Accidental Introduction

Encyrtus aurantii (Geoffroy 1785); Accidental Introduction

Epiblatticida minutissimus (Girault 1923); Accidental Introduction

Epitetracnemus intersectus (Fonscolombe 1832); Accidental Introduction

Eusemion cornigerum (Walker 1838); Accidental Introduction

Gyranusoidea advena Beardsley 1969; Accidental Introduction

Habrolepis dalmanni (Westwood 1837); Deliberate Introduction

Ixodiphagus taiaroaensis Heath & Cane 2010; Endemic

Lamennaisia ambigua (Nees 1834); Accidental Introduction

Metanotalia maderensis (Walker 1872); Accidental Introduction

Metaphycus alberti (Howard, 1831); Accidental Introduction

Metaphycus anneckei Guerrieri & Noyes 2000; Accidental Introduction

Metaphycus lounsburyi (Howard 1898); Deliberate Introduction

Metaphycus reductor Noyes 1988; Endemic

Metaphycus claviger (Timberlake1916); Native

Metaphycus maculipennis (Timberlake1916); Accidental Introduction

Microterys nietneri (Motschulsky 1859); Deliberate Introduction

Notodusmetia coroneti Noyes 1988; Endemic

Odiaglyptus biformis Noyes 1988; Endemic

Parectromoides varipes (Girault 1915); Native

Protyndarichoides cinctiventris (Girault 1934); Native

Pseudococcobius annulipes Noyes 1988; Endemic

Psyllaephagus breviramus Berry 2007; Accidental Introduction

Psyllaephagus cornwallensis Berry 2007; Accidental Introduction

Psyllaephagus richardhenryi Berry 2007; Accidental Introduction

Psyllaephagus acaciae Noyes 1988; Accidental Introduction

Psyllaephagus pilosus Noyes 1988; Accidental Introduction

Psyllaephagus bliteus Riek 1962; Accidental Introduction

Psyllaephagus gemitus Riek 1962; Accidental Introduction

Rhopus garibaldia (Girault 1933); Accidental Introduction

Rhopus anceps Noyes 1988; Endemic

Subprionomitus ferus (Girault 1922); Native

Syrphophagus aphidivorus (Mayr 1876); Accidental Introduction

Tachinaephagus zealandicus Ashmead 1904; Deliberate Introduction

Tachinaephagus australiensis (Girault 1914); Accidental Introduction

Tetracnemoidea peregrina (Compere 1939); Accidental Introduction

Tetracnemoidea bicolor (Girault 1915); Native

Tetracnemoidea brevicornis (Girault 1915); Deliberate Introduction

Tetracnemoidea zelandica Noyes 1988; Endemic

Tetracnemoidea brounii (Timberlake 1929); Endemic

Tetracnemoidea sydneyensis (Timberlake 1929); Accidental Introduction

Zaomma lambinus (Walker 1838); Accidental Introduction

Zelaphycus aspidioti (Tachikawa & Valentine 1969); Endemic

Zelencyrtus latifrons Noyes 1988; Endemic

== Eulophidae ==
Achrysocharoides latreillii (Curtis 1826); Deliberate Introduction

Apleurotropis

Aprostocetus

Aprostocetus zosimus (Walker 1839); Accidental Introduction

Arachnoobius austini Bouček 1988

Asecodes

Astichus

Australsecodes

Baryscapus bruchophagi (Gahan 1913); Accidental Introduction

Baryscapus galactopus (Ratzeburg 1844); Accidental Introduction

Ceranisus menes (Walker 1839); Accidental Introduction

Chrysocharis gemma (Walker 1839); Accidental Introduction

Chrysocharis pubicornis (Zetterstedt 1838); Accidental Introduction

Chrysonotomyia

Cirrospilus variegatus (Masi 1907)

Cirrospilus vittatus Walker 1838; Accidental Introduction

Closterocerus cruy (Girault 1918); Accidental Introduction

Deutereulophus

Diaulomorpha

Diglyphus isaea (Walker 1838); Accidental Introduction

Elachertus

Elasmus

Entedon methion Walker 1839; Accidental Introduction

Entedonastichus dei (Girault 1922)

Euderus

Eulophus

Euplectrus agaristae Crawford 1911

Euplectrus flavipes (Fonscolombe 1832)

Eupronotius; Endemic

Eupronotius scaposus Bouček 1988; Endemic

Hadranellus anomalus LaSalle & Boler 1994

Hemiptarsenus varicornis (Girault 1913); Accidental Introduction

Hyssopus

Thripoctenus javae (Girault, 1917); Deliberate Introduction

Makarora obesa Bouček 1988; Endemic

Melittobia acasta (Walker 1839); Accidental Introduction

Melittobia australica Girault 1912; Accidental Introduction

Melittobia hawaiiensis Perkins 1907; Accidental Introduction

Neochrysocharis formosus (Westwood 1833); Accidental Introduction

Neotrichoporoides viridimaculatus (Fullaway 1955); Accidental Introduction

Nesympiesis venosa Bouček 1988; Endemic

Noyesius metallicus Bouček 1988; Endemic

Noyesius testaceus Bouček 1988; Endemic

Omphale

Oomyzus scaposus (Thompson 1878); Accidental Introduction

Ophelimus eucalypti (Gahan 1922); Accidental Introduction

Ophelimus maskelli (Ashmead 1900); Accidental Introduction

Parasecodella

Pediobius bruchicida (Rondani 1872); Accidental Introduction

Pediobius epigonus (Walker 1839); Deliberate Introduction

Pediobius metallicus (Nees 1834); Deliberate Introduction

Pnigalio pectinicornis (Linnaeus 1758); Accidental Introduction

Pnigalio soemius (Walker 1839); Accidental Introduction

Proacrias

Quadrastichodella aenea Girault 1913; Accidental Introduction

Quadrastichodella nova Girault 1922; Accidental Introduction

Quadrastichodella pilosa Ikeda 1999; Accidental Introduction

Stenomesius

Sympiesis campbellensis (Kerrich & Yoshimoto 1964); Endemic

Sympiesis sericeicornis (Nees 1834); Accidental Introduction

Tamarixia

Tamarixia triozae (Burks 1943); Deliberate Introduction

Tetrastichus

Thripobius javae (Girault, 1917); Deliberate Introduction

Trielacher forticornis Bouček 1988; Endemic

Zasympiesis pilosa Bouček 1988; Endemic

Zealachertus abbreviatus Berry 1999; Endemic

Zealachertus aspirensis Berry 1999; Endemic

Zealachertus bildiri Berry 1999; Endemic

Zealachertus binarius Berry 1999; Endemic

Zealachertus conjunctus Berry 1999; Endemic

Zealachertus holderi Berry 1999; Endemic

Zealachertus longus Berry 1999; Endemic

Zealachertus nephelion Berry 1999; Endemic

Zealachertus nothofagi Bouček 1978; Endemic

Zealachertus pilifer Berry 1999; Endemic

Zealachertus planus Berry 1999; Endemic

Zealachertus tortriciphaga Berry 1999; Endemic

Zeastichus asper Bouček 1988; Endemic

== Eupelmidae ==
Eupelmus antipoda Ashmead 1900; Native

Eupelmus cyaneus (Gourlay 1928); Endemic

Eupelmus vesicularis (Retzius 1783); Accidental Introduction

Eusandalum barteli (Gourlay 1928); Endemic Tineobius

== Eurytomidae ==
Axanthosoma io Girault 1915

Bruchophagus acaciae (Cameron 1910); Accidental Introduction

Bruchophagus gibbus (Boheman 1836); Accidental Introduction

Bruchophagus roddi Gussakovsky 1933; Accidental Introduction

DougiolaAccidental Introduction

Systole foeniculi Otten 1941; Accidental Introduction

Tetramesa linearis (Walker 1832); Accidental Introduction

Tetramesa romana (Walker 1873); Deliberate Introduction

== Figitidae ==
Alloxysta fuscicornis (Hartig 1841); Accidental Introduction

Alloxysta rubidus Ferrer-Suay & Pujade-Villar 2012; Accidental Introduction

Alloxysta thorpei Ferrer-Suay & Pujade-Villar 2012; Accidental Introduction

Alloxysta victrix (Westwood 1833); Accidental Introduction

Anacharis zealandica Ashmead 1900; Native

Ganaspis; Accidental Introduction

Hexacola; Accidental Introduction

Kleidotoma subantarcticana Yoshimoto 1964; Endemic

Leptopilina heterotoma (Thomson 1862); Accidental Introduction

Phaenoglyphis villosa (Hartig 1841); Accidental Introduction

Thoreauella; Accidental Introduction

Trybliographa; Accidental Introduction

Xyalaspis; Accidental Introduction

== Formicidae ==
Amblyopone australis Erichson 1842; Accidental Introduction

Austroponera castanea (Mayr 1865); Endemic

Austroponera castaneicolor (Emery 1893); Endemic

Cardiocondyla minutior Forel 1899; Accidental Introduction

Chelaner antarcticus F. Smith 1858; Endemic

Chelaner smithii Forel 1892; Endemic

Discothyrea antarctica Emery 1895; Endemic

Doleromyrma darwiniana (Forel 1907); Accidental Introduction

Fulakora saundersi (Forel 1892); Endemic

Heteroponera brouni (Forel 1892); Endemic

Huberia brounii Forel 1895; Endemic

Huberia striata (Smith 1876); Endemic

Hypoponera confinis (Roger 1860); Accidental Introduction

Hypoponera eduardi (Forel 1894); Accidental Introduction

Hypoponera punctatissima (Roger 1859); Accidental Introduction

Iridomyrmex suchieri Forel 1907; Accidental Introduction

Linepithema humile (Mayr 1868); Accidental Introduction

Mayriella abstinens Forel 1902; Accidental Introduction

Monomorium antipodum Forel 1901; Accidental Introduction

Monomorium pharaonis (Linnaeus 1758); Accidental Introduction

Monomorium sydneyense Forel 1902; Accidental Introduction

Myrmecorhynchus novaeseelandiae Kaulfuss & Dlussky 2015; Fossil

Nylanderia glabrior (Forel 1902); Accidental Introduction

Nylanderia tasmaniensis (Forel 1913); Accidental Introduction

Ochetellus glaber (Mayr 1862); Accidental Introduction

Orectognathus antennatus Smith 1853; Accidental Introduction

Plagiolepis alluaudi Emery 1894; Accidental Introduction

Pheidole megacephala (Fabricius 1793); Accidental Introduction

Pheidole proxima Mayr 1876; Accidental Introduction

Pheidole rugosula Forel 1902; Accidental Introduction

Pheidole vigilans (Smith 1858); Accidental Introduction

Ponera leae Forel 1913; Accidental Introduction

Prolasius advenus (Smith 1862); Endemic

Rhytidoponera chalybaea Emery 1901; Accidental Introduction

Rhytidoponera gibsoni Kaulfuss & Dlussky 2015; Fossil

Rhytidoponera metallica (Smith 1858); Accidental Introduction

Rhytidoponera waipiata Kaulfuss & Dlussky 2015; Fossil

Solenopsis sp; Accidental Introduction

Strumigenys perplexa (Smith 1876); Accidental Introduction

Strumigenys xenos Brown 1955; Accidental Introduction

Technomyrmex jocosus Forel 1910; Accidental Introduction

Tetramorium bicarinatum (Nylander 1846); Accidental Introduction

Tetramorium grassii Emery 1895; Accidental Introduction

== Gasteruptiidae ==
Gasteruption expectatum Pasteels 1957; Endemic

Gasteruption flavicuspis Kieffer 1911; Endemic

Gasteruption scintillans Pasteels 1957; Endemic

Pseudofoenus crassipes (Smith 1876); Endemic

Pseudofoenus nocticolor Kieffer 1911; Endemic

Pseudofoenus pedunculatus (Schletterer 1889); Endemic

Pseudofoenus unguiculatus (Westwood 1841); Endemic

== Halictidae ==
Lasioglossum cognatum (Smith 1853); Accidental Introduction

Lasioglossum mataroa Donovan 2007; Endemic

Lasioglossum maunga Donovan 2007; Endemic

Lasioglossum sordidum (Smith 1853); Endemic

Nomia melanderi Cockerell 1906; Deliberate Introduction

== Ibaliidae ==
Ibalia leucospoides (Hockenwarth 1785); Deliberate Introduction

== Ichneumonidae ==
Aclastus

Aclosmation

Amblyaclastus melanops Gauld 1984; Accidental Introduction

Anacis

Aotearoazeus bullivantus Khalaim & Ward, 2018; Endemic

Aotearoazeus coronetus Khalaim & Ward, 2018; Endemic

Aotearoazeus probles Khalaim & Ward, 2018; Endemic

Apoclima

Aucklandella conspirata (Smith 1876); Endemic

Aucklandella flavomaculata Cameron 1909; Endemic

Aucklandella geiri (Dalla Torre 1902); Endemic

Aucklandella hudsoni (Cameron 1901); Endemic

Aucklandella machimia (Cameron 1898); Endemic

Aucklandella minuta (Ashmead 1890); Endemic

Aucklandella novazealandica (Cameron 1898); Endemic

Aucklandella pyrastis (Cameron 1901); Endemic

Aucklandella thyellma (Cameron 1898); Endemic

Aucklandella ursula (Cameron 1898); Endemic

Aucklandella utetes (Cameron 1898); Endemic

Aucklandella wellingtoni (Cameron 1901); Endemic

Barycnellus aucklandellus Khalaim & Ward, 2018; Endemic

Barycnellus conlisus Khalaim & Ward, 2018; Endemic

Barycnellus cuvierensis Khalaim & Ward, 2018; Endemic

Barycnellus globosus Khalaim & Ward, 2018; Endemic

Barycnellus robustus Khalaim & Ward, 2018; Endemic

Campoletis obstructor (Smith 1878); Endemic

Campoplex disjunctus Townes 1964; Endemic

Campoplex hudsoni (Cameron 1901); Endemic

Carria fortipes (Cameron 1898); Endemic

Casinaria asessilis Ward 2026; Endemic

Casinaria aucklandensis Ward 2026; Endemic

Casinaria dublinbaya Ward 2026; Endemic

Casinaria floccosae Ward 2026; Endemic

Casinaria fulviventris Ward 2026; Endemic

Casinaria hartnetti Ward 2026; Endemic

Casinaria kendalli Ward 2026; Endemic

Casinaria maculipes Ward 2026; Endemic

Casinaria mercurialis Ward 2026; Endemic

Casinaria saundersi Ward 2026; Endemic

Certonotus fractinervis (Vollenhoven 1873); Endemic

Ctenochares bicolorus (Linnaeus 1767); Accidental Introduction

Degithina actista (Cameron 1898); Endemic

Degithina apicalis (Ashmead 1890); Endemic

Degithina davidi Cameron 1901; Endemic

Degithina decepta (Smith 1876); Endemic

Degithina exhilarata (Smith 1876); Endemic

Degithina hersilia (Cameron 1898); Endemic

Degithina huttonii (Kirby 1881); Endemic

Degithina melanopus (Cameron 1901); Endemic

Degithina sollicitoria (Fabricius 1775); Endemic

Diadegma agens Townes 1964; Endemic

Diadegma muelleri (White 1874); Endemic

Diadegma novaezealandiae Azidah, Fitton, Quicke 2000; Endemic

Diadegma semiclausum (Hellén 1949); Deliberate Introduction

Diadromus collaris (Gravenhorst 1829); Deliberate Introduction

Diaparsis zealandica Khalaim & Ward, 2018; Endemic

Diplazon laetatorius (Fabricius 1781); Accidental Introduction

Dusona destructor Wahl 1991; Endemic

Dusona stramineipes Cameron 1901; Endemic

Echthromorpha intricatoria (Fabricius 1804); Native

Enicospilus insularis (Kirby 1881); Native

Enicospilus skeltonii (Kirby 1881); Native

Euceros coxalis Barron 1978; Endemic

Eutanyacra licitatoria (Erichson 1842); Native

Gauldiana arantia Khalaim & Ward, 2018; Endemic

Gauldiana aspiringa Khalaim & Ward, 2018; Endemic

Gauldiana dubia Khalaim & Ward, 2018; Endemic

Gauldiana kaweka Khalaim & Ward, 2018; Endemic

Gauldiana minuta Khalaim & Ward, 2018; Endemic

Gauldiana nigra Khalaim & Ward, 2018; Endemic

Gauldiana postfurcalis (Khalaim 2006); Endemic

Gauldiana rotoitia Khalaim & Ward, 2018; Endemic

Gauldiana triangulata Khalaim & Ward, 2018; Endemic

Gelis campbellensis Townes1964; Endemic

Gelis philpottii (Brues1922); Endemic

Gelis cinctus (Linnaeus 1758); Accidental Introduction

Gelis tenellus (Say 1836); Accidental Introduction

Glabridorsum stokesii (Cameron 1912); Deliberate Introduction

Habronyx kayi (Gauld 1980); Endemic

Habronyx minutus Ward 2015; Endemic

Helictes

Hypsicera femoralis (Geoffroy 1785); Accidental Introduction

Hypsicera nelsonensis Berry 1990; Endemic

Ichneumon lotatorius Fabricius 1775; Endemic

Ichneumon promissorius Erichson 1842; Native

Isdromas

Kiwi barrattae Khalaim & Ward, 2019; Endemic

Kiwi canterberus Khalaim & Ward, 2019; Endemic

Kiwi earlyi Khalaim & Ward, 2019; Endemic

Kiwi gauldi (Khalaim 2006); Endemic

Kiwi gronous Khalaim & Ward, 2019; Endemic

Kiwi oreteus Khalaim & Ward, 2019; Endemic

Kiwi ruzelus Khalaim & Ward, 2019; Endemic

Kiwi waitakerus Khalaim & Ward, 2019; Endemic

Lathrolestes luteolator (Gravenhorst 1829); Deliberate Introduction

Levansa decoratoria (Fabricius 1775); Endemic

Levansa leodacus (Cameron 1898); Endemic

Liotryphon caudatus (Ratzeburg 1848); Deliberate Introduction

Lissonota albopicta Smith 1878; Endemic

Lissonota aspera Bain 1970; Endemic

Lissonota atra Bain 1970; Endemic

Lissonota comparata Cameron 1898; Endemic

Lissonota flavopicta Smith 1878; Endemic

Lissonota fulva Bain 1970; Endemic

Lissonota multicolor Colenso 1885; Endemic

Lissopimpla excelsa (Costa 1864); Native

Lusius malfoyi Saunders & Ward 2017; Endemic

Mastrus ridens (Horstmann 2009); Deliberate Introduction

Megarhyssa nortoni nortoni (Cresson 1864); Deliberate Introduction

Megastylus

Mesostenus

Mesochorus

Netelia ephippiata (Smith 1876); Endemic

Netelia producta (Brullé 1846); Native

Oedemopsis; Accidental Introduction

Ophion inutilis Smith 1876; Endemic

Ophion oculatus Parrott 1954; Endemic

Ophion peregrinus Smith 1876; Endemic

Ophion punctatus Cameron 1898; Endemic

Paraphylax

Phytodietus zealandicus (Ashmead 1900); Endemic

Poecilocryptus zealandicus Ward 2011; Endemic

Pristomerus foureckensis Klopfstein 2016; Accidental Introduction

Pseudospolas dugdalei Ward 2015; Endemic

Rhyssa lineolata (Kirby 1837); Accidental Introduction

Rhyssa persuasoria persuasoria (Linnaeus 1758); Deliberate Introduction

Sericopimpla crenator (Fabricius, 1804); Accidental Introduction

Sciron enolae Berry 1990; Endemic

Sciron glaber Berry 1990; Endemic

Sphecophaga vesparum vesparum (Ratzeburg 1852); Deliberate Introduction

Stenomacrus; Accidental Introduction

Temelucha; Deliberate Introduction

Trathala agnina (Kerrich 1959); Endemic

Venturia canescens (Gravenhorst 1829); Accidental Introduction

Venturia intrudens (Smith 1878); Endemic

Woldstedtius dundasius Ward 2013; Endemic

Woldstedtius gauldius Ward 2013; Endemic

Woldstedtius titirangiensis Ward 2013; Endemic

Xanthocryptus novozealandicus (Dalla Torre 1902); Native

Xanthopimpla rhopaloceros Krieger 1914; Deliberate Introduction

Xenolytus bitinctus (Gmelin 1790); Accidental Introduction

Zealochus abominosus Khalaim & Ward, 2019; Endemic

Zealochus stepheni Khalaim & Ward, 2019; Endemic

Zealochus supergranulatus Khalaim 2004; Endemic

== Maamingidae ==
Maaminga marrisi Early, Masner, Naumann, Austin 2001; Endemic

Maaminga rangi Early, Masner, Naumann, Austin 2001; Endemic

== Megachilidae ==
Anthidium manicatum (Linnaeus, 1758); Accidental Introduction

Megachile rotundata (Fabricius, 1787); Deliberate Introduction

Osmia caerulescens (Linnaeus, 1758); Deliberate Introduction

== Megaspilidae ==
Conostigmus variipilosus Dessart 1997; Endemic

Dendrocerus aphidum (Rondani 1877); Accidental Introduction

Dendrocerus carpenteri (Curtis 1829); Accidental Introduction

Dendrocerus laticeps (Hedicke 1929); Accidental Introduction

Lagynodes coxivillosus Dessart 1987; Endemic

Lagynodes gastroleius Dessart 1987; Endemic

Lagynodes hecaterapterus Dessart 1981; Endemic

Lagynodes velutinus Dessart & Masner 1977; Endemic

Trichosteresis glabra (Boheman 1832); Accidental Introduction

== Megastigmidae ==
Megastigmus aculeatus (Swederus 1795); Accidental Introduction

Megastigmus spermotrophus Wachtl 1893; Accidental Introduction

== Mutillidae ==
Ephutomorpha bivulnerata (André 1901); Accidental Introduction

== Mymaridae ==
Acmotemnus luteiclava Noyes & Valentine 1989; Endemic

Alaptus

Allanagrus Noyes & Valentine 1989; Endemic

Allarescon ochroceras Noyes & Valentine 1989; Endemic

Anagroidea

Anagrus atomus (Linnaeus 1767); Accidental Introduction

Anagrus bakkendorfi Soyka 1946; Accidental Introduction

Anagrus frequens Perkins 1905; Accidental Introduction

Anagrus incarnatus Haliday 1833; Accidental Introduction

Anagrus optabilis (Perkins 1905); Accidental Introduction

Anagrus ustulatus Haliday 1833; Accidental Introduction

Anaphes nitens (Girault 1928); Deliberate Introduction

Apoxypteron grandiscapus Noyes & Valentine 1989; Endemic

Arescon

Australomymar

Boccacciomymar pobeda Triapitsyn & Berezovskiy 2007; Endemic

Boccacciomymar tak Triapitsyn & Berezovskiy 2007; Endemic

Camptoptera

Camptopteroides verrucosa (Noyes & Valentine 1989); Endemic

Ceratanaphes (Noyes & Valentine 1989); Endemic

Ceratanaphes monticola Noyes & Valentine 1989; Endemic

Cleruchus mandibularis

Cybomymar fasciifrons Noyes & Valentine 1989; Endemic

Dicopomorpha

Dicopus

Dorya pilosa Noyes & Valentine 1989; Endemic

Gonatocerus

Ischiodasys occulta Noyes & Valentine 1989; Endemic

Mimalaptus obscurus Noyes & Valentine 1989; Endemic

Mymar schwanni Girault 1912; Accidental Introduction

Mymar taprobanicum Ward 1875; Accidental Introduction

Neserythmelus zelandicus Noyes & Valentine 1989; Endemic

Nesomymar magniclave Valentine 1971; Endemic

Nesopatasson flavidus Valentine 1971; Endemic

Ooctonus vulgatus Haliday 1833

Paracmotemnus potanus Noyes & Valentine 1989; Endemic

Paranaphoidea mira (Gahan 1927); Endemic

Platystethynium

Polynema

Prionaphes depressus Hincks 1961; Endemic

Pseudanaphes hirtus Noyes & Valentine 1989; Endemic

Richteria lamennaisi Girault 1920

Schizophragma

Scleromymar breve Noyes & Valentine 1989; Endemic

Steganogaster silvicola Noyes & Valentine 1989; Endemic

Stephanodes reduvioli (Perkins 1905); Accidental Introduction

Stethynium

Zelanaphes lamprogonius Noyes & Valentine 1989; Endemic

== Mymarommatidae ==
Mymaromma

Zealaromma insulare (Valentine 1971); Endemic

Zealaromma valentinei Gibson, Read, Huber 2007; Endemic

== Orussidae ==
Guiglia schauinslandi (Ashmead 1903); Endemic

== Pemphredonidae ==
Spilomena earlyi Harris 1994; Endemic

Spilomena elegantula Turner 1916; Endemic

Spilomena emarginata Vardy 1987; Endemic

Spilomena nozela Vardy 1987; Endemic

== Pergidae ==
Phylacteophaga froggatti Riek 1955; Accidental Introduction

== Perilampidae ==
Austrotoxeuma kuscheli Bouček 1988; Endemic

== Platygastridae ==
Allostemma quadrum Buhl 2011; Endemic

Amblyaspis breviscutellaris Buhl 2011; Endemic

Amblyaspis pederseniana Buhl 2013; Endemic

Amblyaspis vilhelmseni Buhl 2011; Endemic

Amitus

Annettella gracilis Masner & Huggert 1989; Endemic

Aphanomerus pusillus Perkins 1905; Accidental Introduction

Ceratacis capitata Buhl 2016; Endemic

Ceratacis latimarginata Buhl 2011; Endemic

Ceratacis newzealandica Buhl 2016; Endemic

Ceratacis projecta Buhl 2011; Endemic

Ceratacis punctatoventis Buhl 2011; Endemic

Ceratacis valentinei Buhl 2016; Endemic

Errolium piceum Masner & Huggert 1989; Endemic

Fidiobia citri (Nixon 1969); Accidental Introduction

Inostemma boscii (Jurine 1807); Deliberate Introduction

Iphitrachelus

Leptacis adiaphana Buhl 2011; Endemic

Leptacis alpina Buhl 2011; Endemic

Leptacis arcuata Buhl 2011; Endemic

Leptacis brachyptera Buhl 2013; Endemic

Leptacis bullivantensis Buhl 2017; Endemic

Leptacis claviger Buhl 2011; Endemic

Leptacis dolichoptera Buhl 2013; Endemic

Leptacis fuscalata Buhl 2011; Endemic

Leptacis grandiclava Buhl 2011; Endemic

Leptacis lanata Buhl 2017; Endemic

Leptacis microalata Buhl 2011; Endemic

Leptacis moa Buhl 2011; Endemic

Leptacis pallidipetiolata Buhl 2011; Endemic

Leptacis peninsularis Buhl 2017; Endemic

Leptacis recticauda Buhl 2011; Endemic

Leptacis rotundiceps Buhl 2017; Endemic

Leptacis schomannae Buhl 2013; Endemic

Leptacis vicina Buhl 2011; Endemic

Metanopedias novaezealandiae Buhl 2011; Endemic

Orseta

Piestopleura rubripes Buhl 2011; Endemic

Platygastemma leptissimum Buhl 2017; Endemic

Platygastemma waitakerense Buhl 2017; Endemic

Platygaster armata Buhl 2017; Endemic

Platygaster ater Buhl 2011; Endemic

Platygaster demades Walker 1835; Deliberate Introduction

Platygaster eucalyptodiplosisae Buhl 2017; Endemic

Platygaster fuscalis Buhl 2011; Endemic

Platygaster hiemalis Forbes 1888; Accidental Introduction

Platygaster mayi Buhl 2017; Endemic

Platygaster novaezealandiae Buhl 2011; Endemic

Platygaster podocarpi Buhl 2015; Endemic

Platygaster politiceps Buhl 2013; Endemic

Platygaster robertensis Buhl 2017; Endemic

Platygaster robiniae Buhl and Duso 2008; Accidental Introduction

Platygaster solodovnikovi Buhl 2011; Endemic

Platygaster subparallela Buhl 2017; Endemic

Platygaster tuberculatrix Buhl 2011; Endemic

Platygaster walkerae Buhl 2017; Endemic

Prosynopeas notaulicum Buhl 2017; Endemic

Synopeas densisetosum Buhl 2016; Endemic

Synopeas denticorne Buhl 2016; Endemic

Synopeas elegans Buhl 2016; Endemic

Synopeas kristenseni Buhl 2016; Endemic

Synopeas lanuginosum Buhl 2016; Endemic

Synopeas marrisi Buhl 2016; Endemic

Synopeas motuhoropapense Buhl 2016; Endemic

Synopeas novaezealandiae Buhl 2011; Endemic

Synopeas occipitocarinatum Buhl 2016; Endemic

Synopeas ramsayi Buhl 2016; Endemic

Synopeas terrestre Buhl 2016; Endemic

Synopeas trifolii Buhl 2016; Endemic

Synopeas wardi Buhl 2016; Endemic

Zelamerus amicorum Masner & Huggert 1989; Endemic

Zelandonota bidentata Buhl 2011; Endemic

Zelandonota dorsipunctata Buhl 2011; Endemic

Zelandonota kiwi Masner & Huggert 1989; Endemic

Zelandonota rufiscutum Buhl 2011; Endemic

Zelandonota vilhelmseni Buhl 2011; Endemic

Zelostemma alpinum Buhl 2017; Endemic

Zelostemma altipetiolata Buhl 2011; Endemic

Zelostemma breviantennatum Buhl 2017; Endemic

Zelostemma brevicaudum Buhl 2017; Endemic

Zelostemma brevistriatum Buhl 2017; Endemic

Zelostemma chionochloae Buhl 2008; Endemic

Zelostemma dromedarium Buhl 2011; Endemic

Zelostemma dugdalei Buhl 2017; Endemic

Zelostemma gastrotrypoideum Buhl 2017; Endemic

Zelostemma gourlayi Buhl 2017; Endemic

Zelostemma inaequale Buhl 2017; Endemic

Zelostemma insulare Buhl 2017; Endemic

Zelostemma laevicornu Buhl 2017; Endemic

Zelostemma laevipetiolatum Buhl 2017; Endemic

Zelostemma latipetiolatum Buhl 2017; Endemic

Zelostemma longiabdominatum Buhl 2017; Endemic

Zelostemma longipedicellatum Buhl 2017; Endemic

Zelostemma masneri Buhl 2017; Endemic

Zelostemma medionitens Buhl 2017; Endemic

Zelostemma munki Buhl 2017; Endemic

Zelostemma nottoni Buhl 2017; Endemic

Zelostemma noyesi Buhl 2017; Endemic

Zelostemma obscurum Buhl 2017; Endemic

Zelostemma oleariae (Maskell 1888); Endemic

Zelostemma peninsulare Buhl 2017; Endemic

Zelostemma popovicii Buhl 2017; Endemic

Zelostemma rubi Buhl 2017; Endemic

Zelostemma semialatum Buhl 2017; Endemic

Zelostemma striatipetiolatum Buhl 2017; Endemic

Zelostemma terrestre Buhl 2017; Endemic

Zelostemma thorpei Buhl 2017; Endemic

Zelostemma toftei Buhl 2017; Endemic

Zelostemma vilhelmseni Buhl 2017; Endemic

Zelostemma wardi Buhl 2017; Endemic

== Pompilidae ==
Cryptocheilus australis (Guerin-Meneville 1830); Accidental Introduction

Epipompilus insularis Kohl 1885; Endemic

Priocnemis carbonarius (Smith 1855); Endemic

Priocnemis conformis Smith 1876; Endemic

Priocnemis crawi Harris 1987; Endemic

Priocnemis monachus (Smith 1855); Endemic

Priocnemis nitidiventris Smith 1878; Endemic

Priocnemis ordishi Harris 1987; Endemic

Sphictostethus calvus Harris 1987; Endemic

Sphictostethus fugax (Fabricius 1775); Endemic

Sphictostethus nitidus (Fabricius 1775); Endemic; the golden hunter wasp

== Proctotrupidae ==
Exallonyx trifoveatus Kieffer 1908; Accidental Introduction

Fustiserphus intrudens (Smith 1878); Endemic

Fustiserphus longiceps Townes 1981; Endemic

Oxyserphus baini Townes 1981; Endemic

Oxyserphus maculipennis (Cameron 1888); Endemic

Oxyserphus pediculatus Townes 1981; Endemic

== Pteromalidae ==
Acoelocyba

Acroclisoides; Accidental Introduction

Amerostenus

Anisopteromalus calandrae (Howard 1881); Accidental Introduction

Aphobetus cultratus Berry 1995; Endemic

Aphobetus cyanea (Bouček 1988); Endemic

Aphobetus erroli Berry 1995; Endemic

Aphobetus maskelli Howard 1896; Endemic

Aphobetus nana (Bouček 1988); Endemic

Aphobetus paucisetosus Berry 1995; Endemic

Asaphes vulgaris Walker 1834; Accidental Introduction

Callitula viridicoxa (Girault 1913)

Camarothorax; Accidental Introduction

Cerocephala

Cerocephala cornigera Westwood 1832; Accidental Introduction

Cleonymus

Dibrachys

Dibrachys microgastri (Bouché 1834); Accidental Introduction

Dipareta

Enoggera nassaui Girault 1926; Deliberate Introduction

Epanogmus

Errolia cyanea Bouček 1988; Endemic

Eukoebelea australiensis (Ashmead 1904); Accidental Introduction

Euneura

Fusiterga gallarum Bouček 1988; Endemic

Fusiterga lativentris Bouček 1988; Endemic

Gastrancistrus

Herodotia subatriventris (Girault 1923); Accidental Introduction

Homoporus nypsius (Walker 1839); Accidental Introduction

Inkaka quadridentata Girault 1939

Lariophagus distinguendus (Föerster 1840); Accidental Introduction

Macromesus

Maorita reticulata Bouček 1988; Endemic

Mesopolobus incultus (Walker 1834); Accidental Introduction

Mesopolobus nobilis (Walker 1834); Accidental Introduction

Moranila aotearoae Berry 1995; Endemic

Moranila californica (Howard 1881); Accidental Introduction

Moranila comperei (Ashmead 1904); Accidental Introduction

Moranila strigaster Berry 1995; Endemic

Muscidifurax raptor Girault & Sanders 1910; Deliberate Introduction

Nambouria xanthops Berry & Withers 2002; Accidental Introduction

Nasonia vitripennis (Walker 1836); Deliberate Introduction

Neocalosoter

Neopolycystus insectifurax Girault 1915; Accidental Introduction

Notoglyptus scutellaris (Dodd & Girault 1915); Accidental Introduction

Odontofroggatia galili Wiebes 1980; Accidental Introduction

Omphalodipara

Ophelosia australis Berry 1995; Endemic

Ophelosia bifasciata Girault 1916; Accidental Introduction

Ophelosia charlesi Berry 1995; Accidental Introduction

Ophelosia crawfordi Riley 1890; Accidental Introduction

Ophelosia keatsi Girault 1927; Accidental Introduction

Ophelosia mcglashani Berry 1995; Endemic

Ophelosia stenopteryx Berry 1995; Endemic

Pachyneuron aphidis (Bouché 1834); Accidental Introduction

Proshizonotus resplendens (Gourlay 1928); Endemic

Pseudanogmus silanus (Walker 1843)

Pseudidarnes minerva Girault 1927; Accidental Introduction

Pseudoceraphron

Pteromalus puparum (Linnaeus 1758); Deliberate Introduction

Pteromalus semotus (Walker 1834); Deliberate Introduction

Pteromalus sequester Walker 1835; Accidental Introduction

Rhaphitelus maculatus Walker 1834; Accidental Introduction

Rhopalicus tutela (Walker 1836); Deliberate Introduction

Scutellista caerule (Fonscolombe 1832); Accidental Introduction

Spalangia cameroni Perkins 1910; Accidental Introduction

Spalangia endius Walker 1839; Accidental Introduction

Spalangia nigra Latreille 1805; Accidental Introduction

Spalangia nigroaenea Curtis 1839; Accidental Introduction

Stinoplus etearchus (Walker 1848); Accidental Introduction

Sycoscapter australis (Froggatt 1900); Accidental Introduction

Systasis lelex (Walker 1839); Endemic

Theocolax formiciformis Westwood 1832; Accidental Introduction

Trichomalopsis hemiptera (Walker 1835); Accidental Introduction

Trichomalopsis iambe (Walker 1839); Endemic

Trigonogastrella

Zeala walkerae Bouček 1988; Endemic

== Rotoitidae ==
Rotoita basalis Bouček & Noyes 1987; Endemic

== Scelionidae ==
Baeus leai Dodd 1914

Baeus saliens (Hickman 1967)

Baeus seminulum Haliday 1833

Calliscelio teleogrylli Hill 1983; Endemic

Ceratobaeus mussiae Iqbal & Austin 2000; Endemic

Ceratobaeus turneri (Dodd 1920)

Cremastobaeus

Eumicrosoma

Genatropis

Gryon

Hickmanella

Idris

Mirobaeus

Mirotelenomus

Neobaeus novazealandensis Austin 1988; Endemic

Odontacolus berryae Valerio & Austin 2013; Native

Odontacolus pintoi Valerio & Austin 2013; Native

Opisthacantha

Probaryconus dubius (Nixon 1931); Accidental Introduction

Sceliacanthella

Scelio

Teleas

Telenomus crinisacri (Quail 1901);

Telenomus kaingaroa Talamas, 2026

Trimorus castaneus (Brues 1922); Endemic

Trimorus novaezealandiae (Brues 1922); Endemic

Trissolcus basalis (Wollaston 1858); Deliberate Introduction

Trissolcus maori Johnson 1991; Endemic

Trissolcus oenone Johnson 1991; Native

Triteleia

== Scolebythidae ==
Ycaploca sp.; Accidental Introduction

== Scoliidae ==
Radumeris tasmaniensis (Saussure 1855); Accidental Introduction

== Signiphoridae ==
Chartocerus

Signiphora flavella Girault 1913; Accidental Introduction

Signiphora flavopalliata Ashmead 1880; Accidental Introduction

Signiphora merceti Malenotti 1916; Accidental Introduction

== Siricidae ==
Sirex noctilio Fabricius 1793; Accidental Introduction

== Sparasionidae ==
Archaeoteleia chambersi Early 2007; Endemic

Archaeoteleia gilbertae Early 2007; Endemic

Archaeoteleia karere Early 2007; Endemic

Archaeoteleia novaezealandiae Masner 1968; Endemic

Archaeoteleia onamata Early 2007; Endemic

Archaeoteleia waipoua Early 2007; Endemic

== Sphecidae ==
Podalonia tydei suspiciosa (Smith 1856); Accidental Introduction

== Tenthredinidae ==
Caliroa cerasi (Linnaeus 1758); Accidental Introduction

Cladius brullei (Dahlbom 1835); Accidental Introduction

Cladius grandis (Serville 1823); Accidental Introduction

Cladius respondens (Förster 1854); Accidental Introduction

Euura proxima (Serville 1823); Accidental Introduction

Euura viduata (Zetterstedt 1838); Accidental Introduction

Monophadnus spinolae (Klug 1816); Deliberate Introduction

== Torymidae ==
Idiomacromerus terebrator (Masi 1916); Accidental Introduction

Palmon frater (Girault 1913); Native

Podagrion

Torymoides antipoda (Kirby 1883); Endemic

Torymus varians (Walker 1833); Accidental Introduction

== Trichogrammatidae ==
Aphelinoidea

Brachyia

Lathromeris

Megaphragma pintoi Viggiani 2022; Accidental Introduction

Oligosita

Pseudogrammina

Trichogramma falx Pinto & Oatman 1996

Trichogramma funiculatum Carver 1978; Accidental Introduction

Trichogramma maori Pinto & Oatman 1996; Endemic

Trichogramma minutum Riley 1871

Trichogramma valentinei Pinto & Oatman 1996; Endemic

Trichogrammatoidea bactrae Nagaraja 1978; Accidental Introduction

Trichogrammatomyia

Ufens vectis Owen 2011; Native

Zelogramma maculatum Noyes & Valentine 1989; Endemic

== Vespidae ==
Ancistrocerus gazella (Panzer 1798); Accidental Introduction

Paralastor sp.; Accidental Introduction

Polistes chinensis antennalis Perez 1905; Accidental Introduction

Polistes dominula (Christ 1791); Accidental Introduction

Polistes humilis (Fabricius 1781); Accidental Introduction

Vespula germanica (Fabricius 1793); Accidental Introduction

Vespula vulgaris (Linnaeus 1758); Accidental Introduction

== Xiphydriidae ==
Moaxiphia decepta (Smith 1876); Endemic

Moaxiphia duniana (Gourlay 1927); Endemic

Moaxiphia gourlayi Ward & Goulet 2011; Endemic
