= Welland Place Park =

Park in Wellington, New Zealand

Coordinates: 41°20′42.5″S 174°45′40.5″E

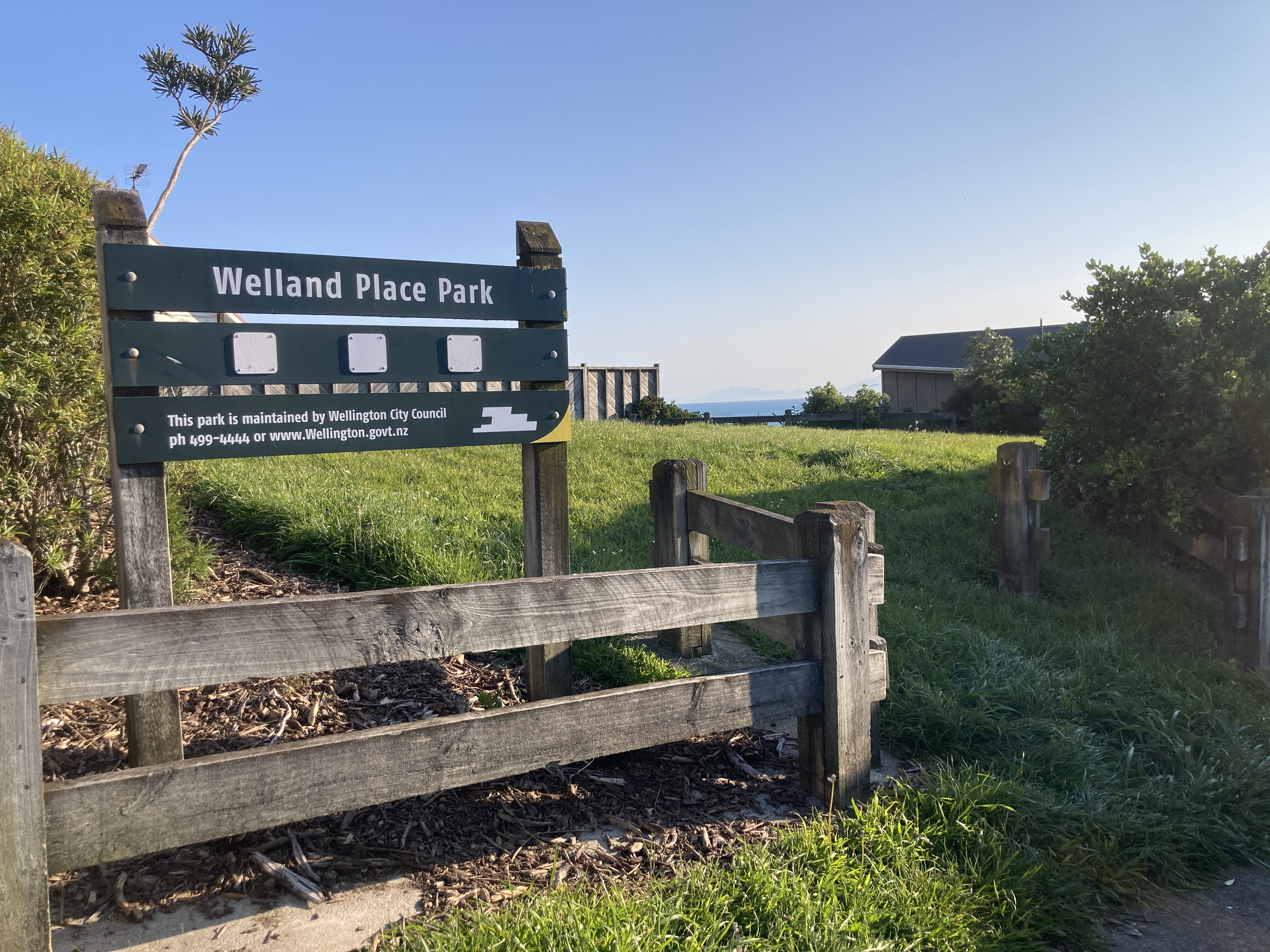
The entrance to Welland Place Park

Welland Place Park is a small public park in Wellington, New Zealand.

It is located between the suburbs of Island Bay and Ōwhiro Bay, overlooking the south coast. The park features a grass lawn, native planting, and perimeter fencing.

It is listed as a local reserve on Wellington City Council's public map of reserves.

== Access ==
Welland Place Park is accessible via Welland Place. There are no stairs, making it suitable for wheelchairs and prams.

== Ecology ==
The park includes a number of native species planted as part of local restoration efforts. Notable flora include taupata and koromiko.
