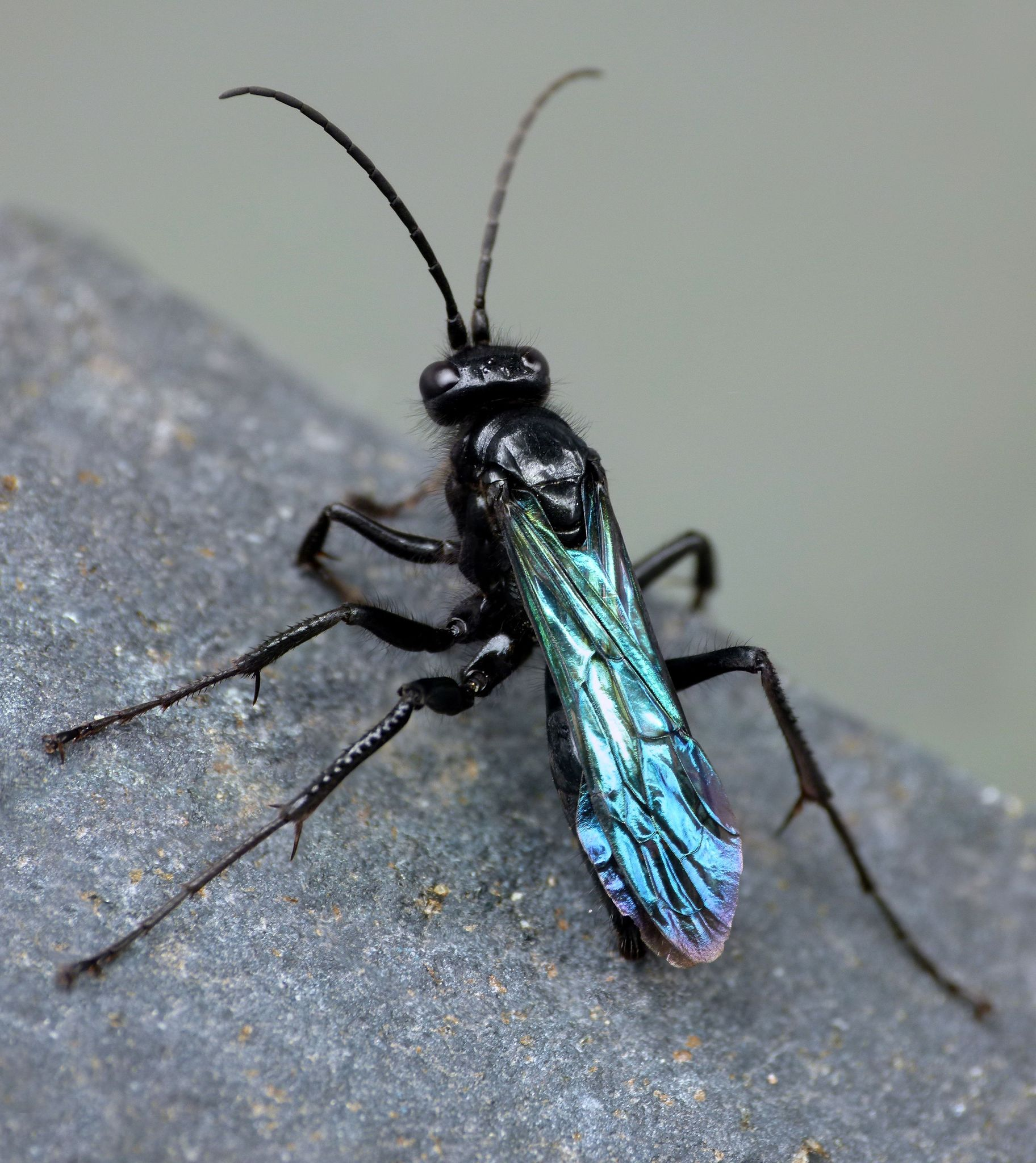

Scientific classification
- Domain: Eukaryota
- Kingdom: Animalia
- Phylum: Arthropoda
- Class: Insecta
- Order: Hymenoptera
- Family: Pompilidae
- Genus: Priocnemis
- Species: P. monachus

Binomial name
- Priocnemis monachus (Smith 1855)

Synonyms
- Priocnemis monarchus (sic); Priocnemis triangulatus

= Priocnemis monachus =

Species of endemic New Zealand spider-hunting wasp

Priocnemis monachus is a species of spider wasp endemic to New Zealand, where it is known as the black hunting wasp or ngaro wīwī. It hunts large tunnelweb or trapdoor spiders, paralysing them with its sting and storing them in burrows for its larvae to eat alive. It is the largest member of the family Pompilidae in New Zealand.

== Taxonomy ==
The holotype of this species was collected by Joseph Dalton Hooker, and is in the Banks collection of the British Museum of Natural History. It is one of a number of species named but not described by Adam White, and intended to appear in the series Voyage of the Erebus and Terror, but not in fact being published there. In error, Frederick Smith in 1855 attributed the species to White, but Smith's listing of it as Pompilus monachus in his Catalogue of hymenopterous insects in the British Museum is the first published description. In the years following its description, the species has been placed in the genera Pompilus, Salius, Trichocurgus, and Chirodamus, but in Anthony Harris's 1987 revision of New Zealand pompilids he assigned it to Priocnemis, subgenus Trichocurgus.

== Name ==
This species is known as the black hunting wasp or large black hunting wasp in English, and in Māori as ngaro wīwī (written "ngaro wiwi", without macrons, in older sources). Ngaro is a generic Māori word for fly or wasp, and wīwī conveys walking to distant places (as in the phrase ki wīwī ki wāwā for going walkabout). This name is used for all the New Zealand hunting wasps in the families Eumenidae, Pompilidae, and Sphecidae, such as Pison spinolae and Tachysphex nigerrimus.

== Distribution and habitat ==
Priocnemis monachus is endemic and widespread in New Zealand where it occupies habitats where its prey are abundant. Typically, the wasps will nest in exposed banks in forests, but may also nest in sand and gardens.

== Description ==
Adults of Priocnemis monachus have a metallic bluish-black colouration. The males tend to be smaller than the female, but size is variable even within the same sex. The female reaches up to 26mm in length whilst the male may reach 19mm in length. The body is covered in black hairs.

== Hosts/prey ==
Priocnemis monachus are parasitoids. An adult wasp will paralyze large spiders, primarily mygalomorphs, and drag them back to their nest to be used as food for the wasp's larvae. Known hosts of P. monachus includes the black tunnelweb (Porrhothele antipodiana), trapdoor (Cantuaria spp.), funnelweb (Hexathele), sheetweb (Cambridgea foliata), nurseryweb (Dolomedes minor), and vagrant spiders (Uliodon). P. monachus prefers spiders which make lidless burrows in the soil. As adults, the wasp will feed on fruit and nectar from a variety of available plants such as Leptospermum scoparium (flowers) and Pennantia corymbosa (fruit).

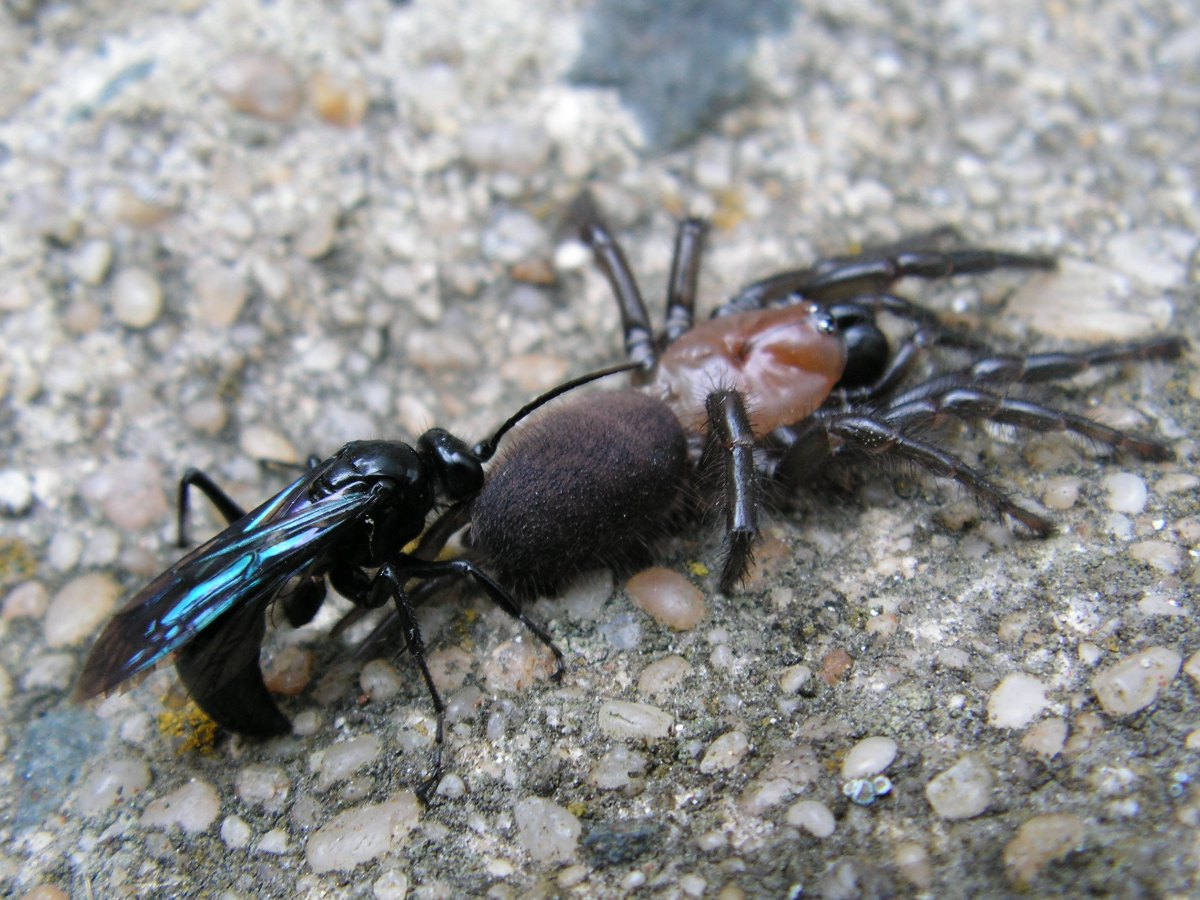
Priocnemis monachus dragging a paralyzed Porrhothele antipodiana back to its nest.
