= Leioproctus huakiwi =

Scientific classification
- Kingdom: Animalia
- Phylum: Arthropoda
- Class: Insecta
- Order: Hymenoptera
- Family: Colletidae
- Genus: Leioproctus
- Species: L. huakiwi

Binomial name
- Leioproctus huakiwi Donovan 2007

Species of bee, endemic to New Zealand

Leioproctus huakiwi is a species of bee in the family Colletidae family. This species was first described in 2007 and is endemic to New Zealand. L. huakiwi is a solitary bee, small and mainly black in appearance. It nests in the ground in bare, dry and fine soil. This species has been the subject of a successful translocation in Canterbury in 2005.

== Taxonomy ==
This species was first described in 2007 by Barry James Donovan and named Leiproctus huakiwi. The holotype specimen was collected by Donovan and held in the New Zealand Arthropod Collection.

== Description ==
This species is small, varying between 7.7 and 11.8 millimetres in length, with the female being larger than the male. Both the male and female of this species are mostly black in appearance with their antennae being mostly brown and their metasoma terminal segment being brown to black with the apex portion being red. The female of the species can be distinguished from similar looking species as it has a raised vertical ridge on its face.

== Distribution ==
This species can be found in the North, South and Steward islands of New Zealand. However, the increase in intensity of agricultural use of land over the last 200 years has eliminated this bee species from some areas of its historic range.

== Habitat and hosts ==
This species occurs all over New Zealand in areas of vegetation and have been found at altitudes ranging from sea level up to 1050 metres. Their nesting sites can be found in a wide variety of sites made up of bare, dry and fine soils including on sandy beaches, silty riverbanks, domestic gardens and on golf courses. Their nests may be made in the presence of nests of other New Zealand endemic bees and cannot be distinguished by the eye from the nests of L. pango. L. huakiwi appears not to be selective in its plant hosts and has been seen feeding and collecting pollen from a variety of species, native and introduced. Adult bees have been observed on the flowers of native species such as Carmichaelia stevensonii, Cordyline australis, Hoheria angustifolia, Kunzea ericoides, Leptospermum scoparium, and Veronica stricta. They have also been found on the flowers of introduced species such as Actinidia chinensis var. deliciosa, Daucus carota, and Persea americana.

== Behaviour ==
Adults of this species are on the wing from October until April.

== Conservation status and translocations ==
Although L. huakiwi is not listed in the Department of Conservation threat classification report published in 2017, this species is known to be rare in Canterbury. Prior to 2005 only a few scattered nests were known to local entomologists throughout that region. The discovery of several hundred nests in a residential vegetable garden prompted an attempt at translocating several of those nests to Plant and Food Research at the Canterbury Agriculture and Science Centre. This was to enable the study of whether reintroductions of this species might be successful. After three years of study it was found that the number of bees at the site had increased by between 8 and 25 times, indicating relocation of this species could be successfully undertaken.

== Etymology ==
This species is named for the Māori name for kiwifruit, huakiwi, as this species is frequently attracted to kiwifruit blossoms.
