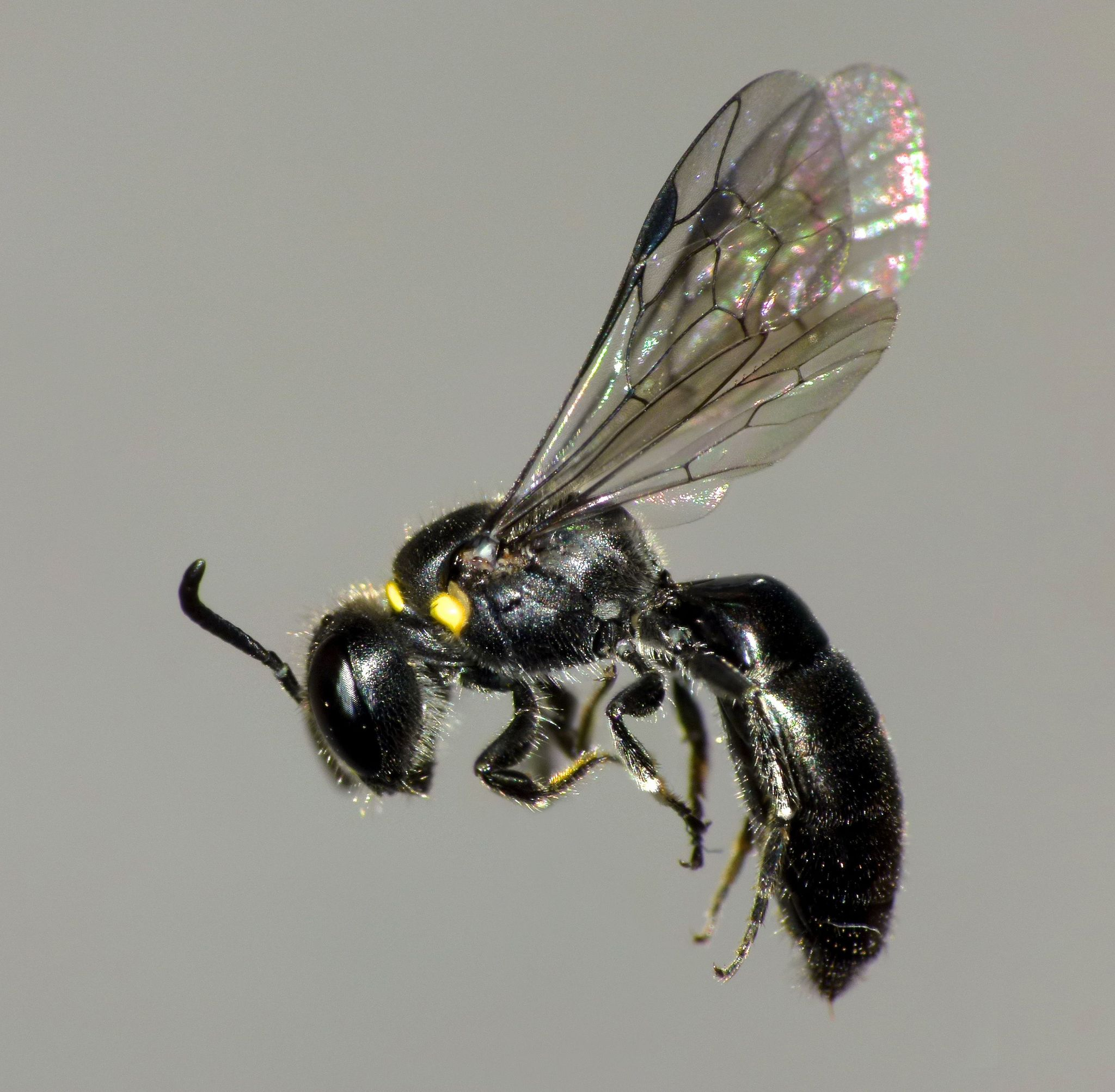

Scientific classification
- Kingdom: Animalia
- Phylum: Arthropoda
- Clade: Pancrustacea
- Class: Insecta
- Order: Hymenoptera
- Family: Colletidae
- Genus: Hylaeus
- Species: H. relegatus

Binomial name
- Hylaeus relegatus (Smith, 1876)

Synonyms
- Prosopis relegatus Smith, 1876; Prosopis sulcifrons Cameron, 1898; Prosopis cameroni Cockerell, 1905b; Prosopis maoriana Cockerell, 1909; Hylaeus cameroni (Cockerell, 1905b); Hylaeus maorianus (Cockerell, 1909); Hylaeus relegatus (Smith, 1876); Hylaeus hudsoni Cockerell, 1925; Prosopis hudsoni Meyer, 1931

= Hylaeus relegatus =

Species of bee, endemic to New Zealand

Hylaeus relegatus is a bee species in the family Colletidae. It is endemic to New Zealand and was first described by Frederick Smith. It is the largest and most common species of this genus in that country. H. relegatus can be found throughout the three main islands of New Zealand and visits the flowers of a wide variety of plant species, both native and introduced. Although widespread, this species is not abundant at any one particular location. It has been hypothesised that human made nest sites can be used to increase its numbers.

== Taxonomy ==
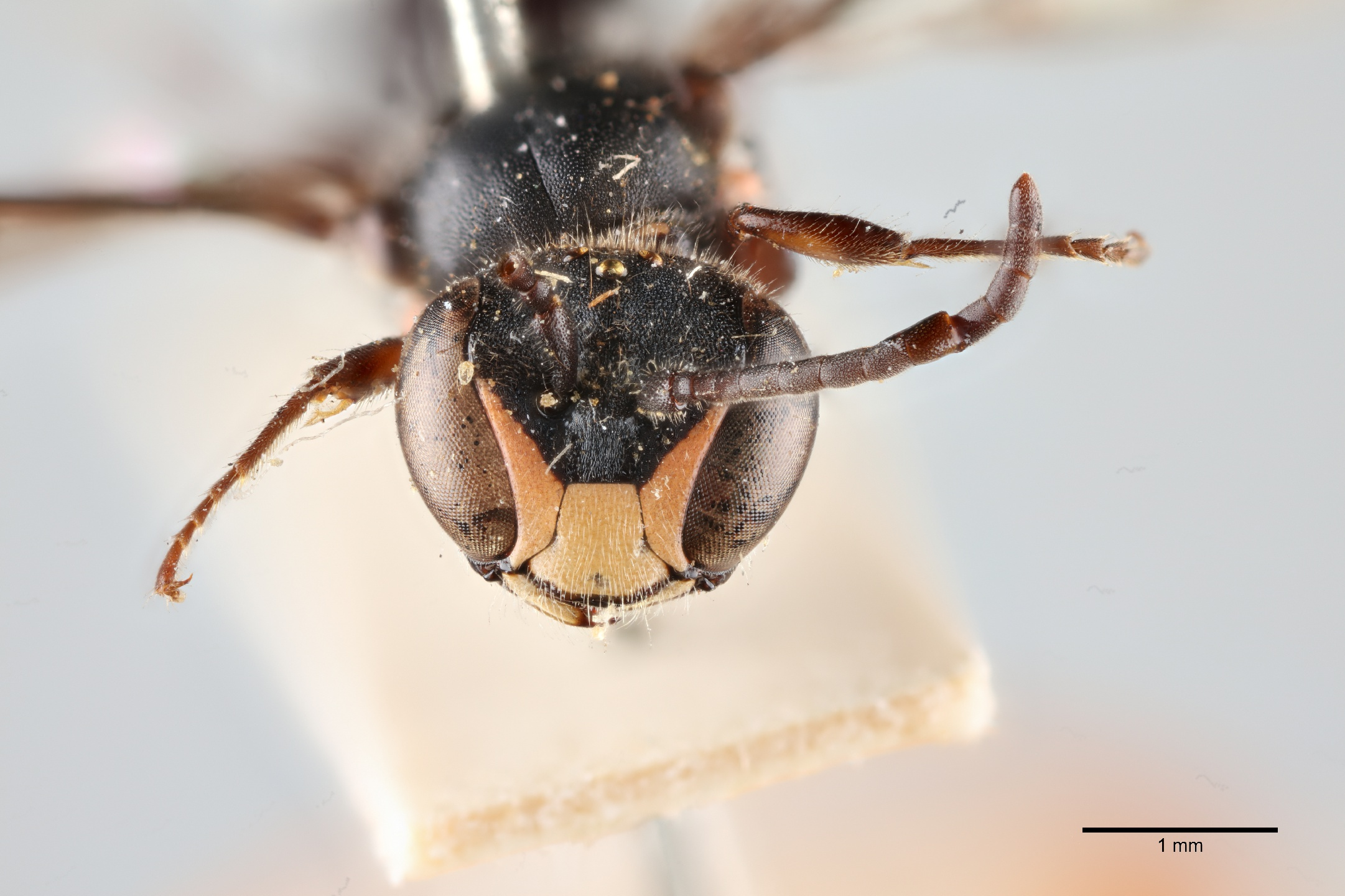
Male type specimen

This species was first described by Frederick Smith in 1876 under the name Prosopis relegatus. Smith used a specimen collected in the Canterbury region by Charles Marcus Wakefield, a land surveyor and nephew of Edward Gibbon Wakefield. The male type specimen used by Smith is held at the Natural History Museum, London.

== Description ==
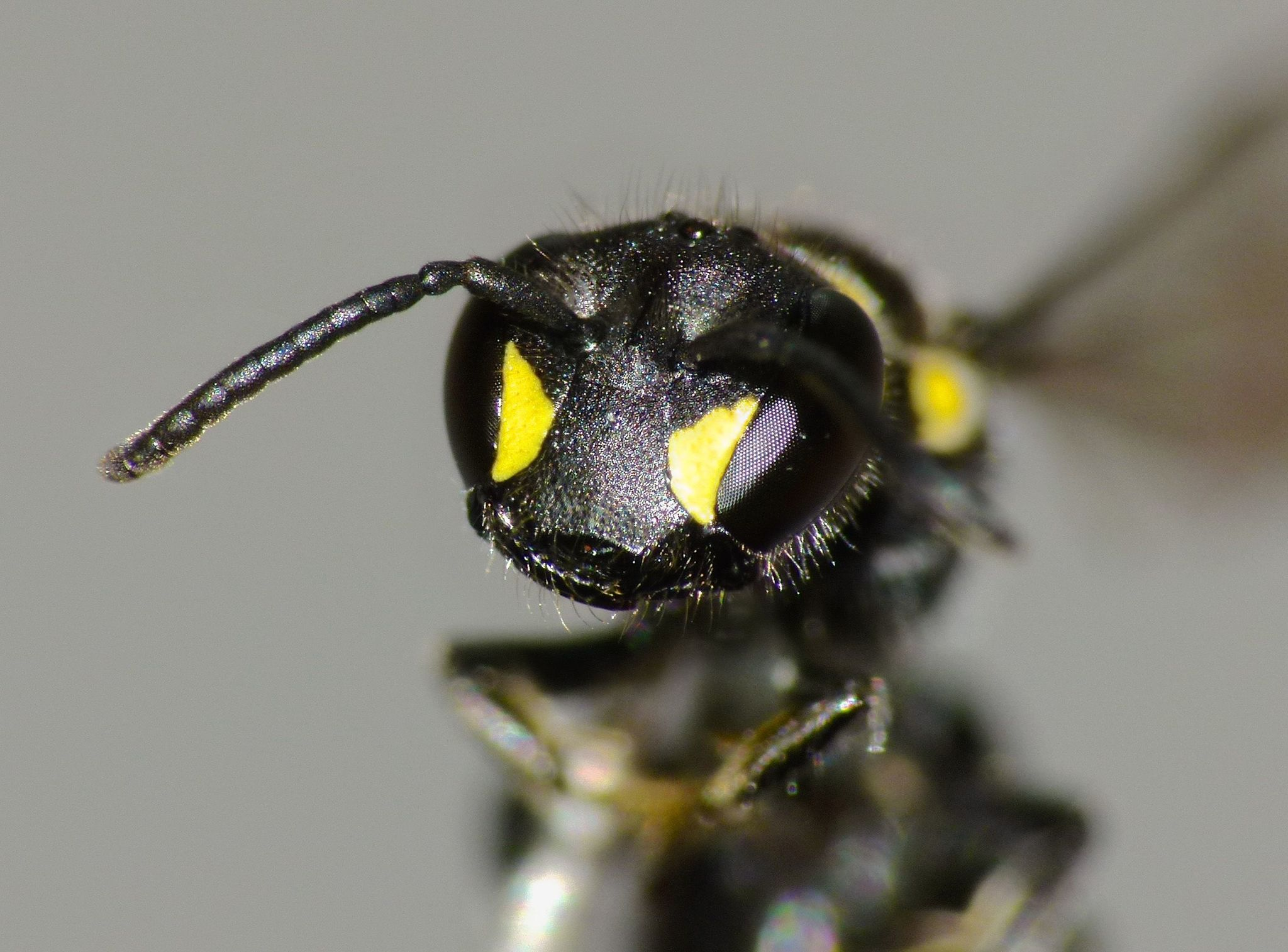
Female

Smith originally described the species as follows:

Male. — Length 3 1/2 lines. Black; head subopaque, very closely and finely punctured; the clypeus and inner orbits of the eyes, as high as opposite the insertion of the antennae, yellowish-white; the mandibles with a longitudinal white stripe. Thorax : the disk closely and finely punctured; the metathorax with a triangular enclosed space at its base, which at its basal margin has a series of abbreviated striae; a spot on each side of the collar, and the tubercles, yellow; wings subhyaline and iridescent, the nervures black; the first recurrent nervure uniting with the first transverso-medial nervure; the second recurrent received near the apex of the second submarginal cell; the calcaria pale testaceous. Abdomen oblong-ovate, shining; towards the base very finely punctured.

The females of this species are between 6.5 and 9.1 mm in length and are black faced with yellow markings on the area extending along the sides of the face parallel to the eye. The female of this species can be variable in its facial colouration with females on the Three Kings Islands lacking the yellow markings. The male of the species is between 5.7 and 7.7 mm in length with the face, apart from black lower margin, entirely yellow.

== Range ==
This species is endemic to New Zealand and can be found in the North, South, Stewart, Chatham and Three Kings Islands. Although spread throughout the country this species is not normally abundant in any one particular location.

== Behaviour ==
Adults of this species are active between the months of November and April. This species makes its nest by boring cells into wood, dead branches or even flax flower stalks. The female stocks the cells with pollen upon which the larvae feed. This species frequently occupies human made nest sites and it has been hypothesised that lack of nest sites is probably the main factor limiting its numbers in specific localities. This species has been observed blowing pollen "bubbles". This is thought to be a way to concentrate the pollen this insect carries in its crop.

== Hosts and parasites ==
This species has a wide variety of host species. New Zealand native host species include species such as Raoulia australis, Carmichaelia species, Phormium tenax, Cordyline australis, Kunzea ericoides, Metrosideros excelsa and Veronica stricta. Some of the introduced plants that play host to H. relegatus include Actinidia chinensis var. deliciosa, Allium species, Daucus carota, Kniphofia praecox, Castanea sativa and Rubus species. It has been hypothesised that H. relegatus are poor pollinators as they carry the pollen they collect in their crop.

The larvae of species in the wasp genus Gasteruption have been observed attacking nests of H. relegatus. The parasite larvae consumes the provisions of the bee cell, starving the bee larvae. The species Coelopencyrtus australis is known to internally parasitise H. relegatus. The mould mite Tyrophagus putrescentiae also appears to kill H. relegatus larvae.

== Conservation status ==
As of 2021, this species is not regarded as being at risk and was not mentioned in the most recent 2014 Threat Classification report for New Zealand Hymenoptera. However concerns have been raised about the increase in the number of honey bees in New Zealand and the effect this may be having on endemic bees.
