= Thoreauella =

Scientific classification
- Kingdom: Animalia
- Phylum: Arthropoda
- Class: Insecta
- Order: Hymenoptera
- Family: Figitidae
- Genus: Thoreauella; Girault, 1930
- Species: T. amatrix

Binomial name
- Thoreauella amatrix Girault, 1930

Genus of wasps

Thoreauella is a monotypic genus of wasps belonging to the family Figitidae. The only species is Thoreauella amatrix.
