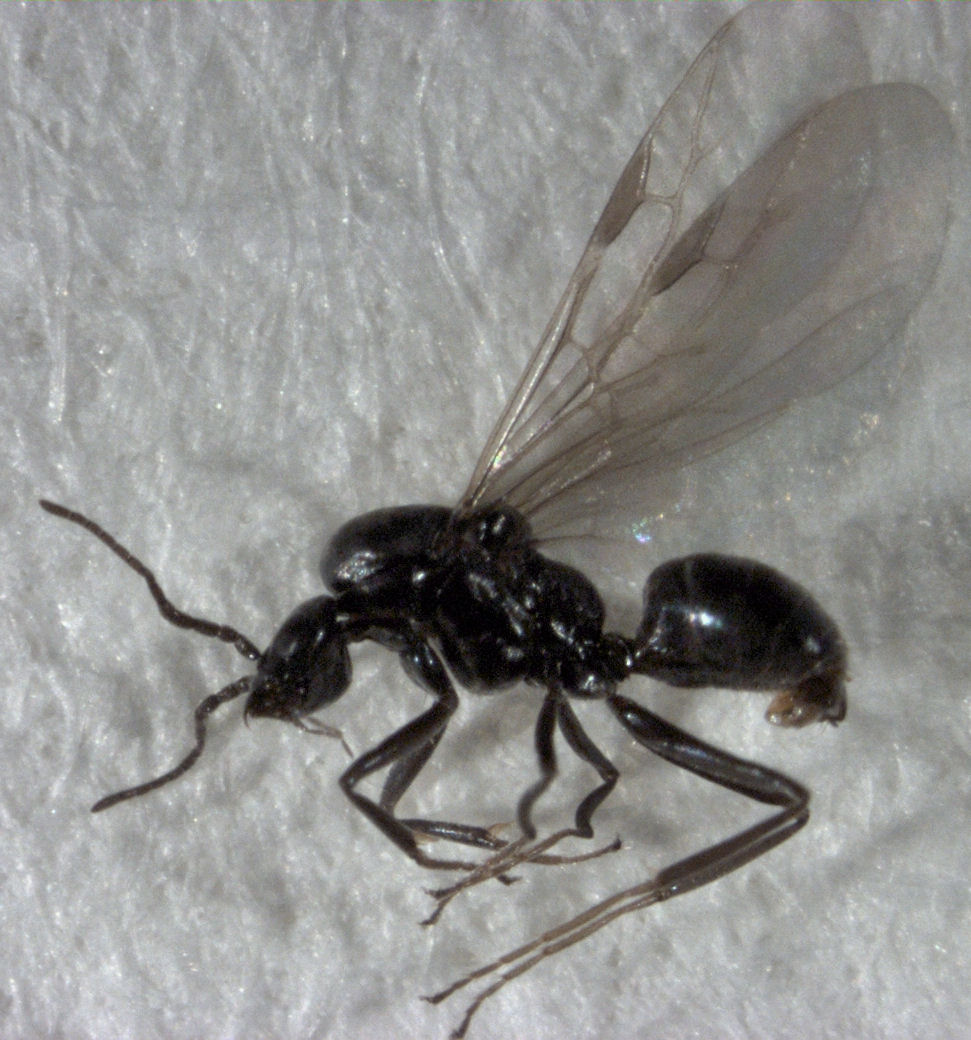

Scientific classification
- Kingdom: Animalia
- Phylum: Arthropoda
- Class: Insecta
- Order: Hymenoptera
- Family: Formicidae
- Subfamily: Dolichoderinae
- Genus: Iridomyrmex
- Species: I. suchieri

Binomial name
- Iridomyrmex suchieri Forel, 1907

Synonyms
- Iridomyrmex obscurus Crawley, 1921

= Iridomyrmex suchieri =

Species of ant

Iridomyrmex suchieri is a species of ant in the genus Iridomyrmex. Described by Auguste-Henri Forel in 1907, the species is endemic to Australia, but has also been recorded from New Zealand.
