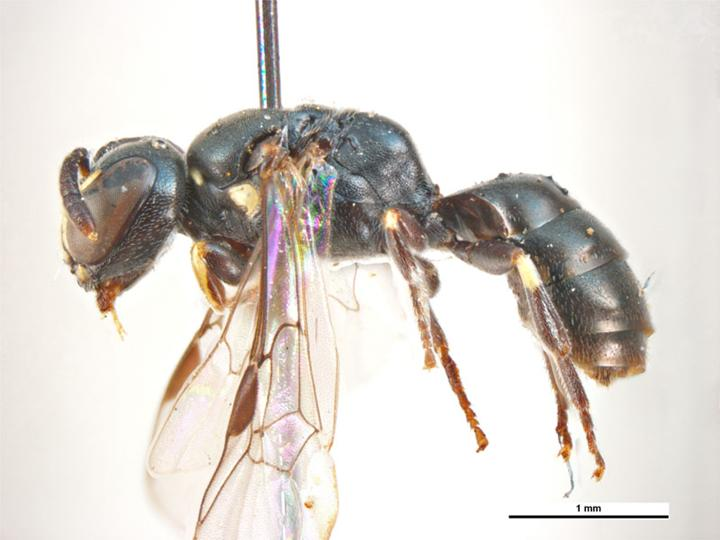
- Female

Scientific classification
- Kingdom: Animalia
- Phylum: Arthropoda
- Clade: Pancrustacea
- Class: Insecta
- Order: Hymenoptera
- Family: Colletidae
- Genus: Hylaeus
- Species: H. perhumilis

Binomial name
- Hylaeus perhumilis (Cockerell, 1914)

Synonyms
- Prosopis perhumilis Cockerell, 1914

= Hylaeus perhumilis =

Species of bee

Hylaeus perhumilis, or Hylaeus (Prosopisteron) perhumilis, is a species of bee in the family Colletidae and subfamily Hylaeinae. Originally endemic to Australia, it has been introduced to New Zealand. It was described by British-American entomologist Theodore Dru Alison Cockerell in 1914.

== Description ==
Male body length is about 4 mm. Integumental colouration is mainly black, with yellow markings.

== Distribution and habitat ==
The species occurs in both eastern and south-western Australia. The type locality is Yallingup, Western Australia.

== Behaviour ==
The adults are flying mellivores. Flowering plants visited by the bees include Angophora, Banksia, Callistemon, Eucalyptus, Leptospermum and Melaleuca species.

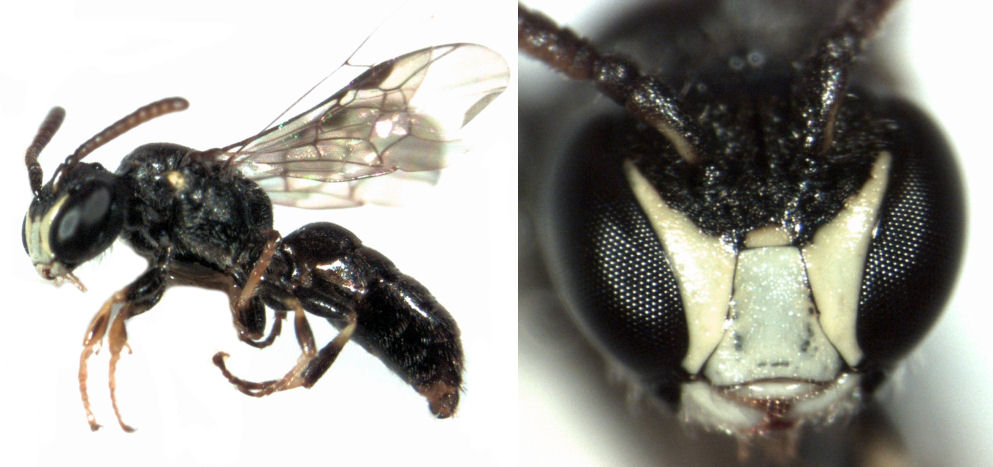
Male – lateral view and face
