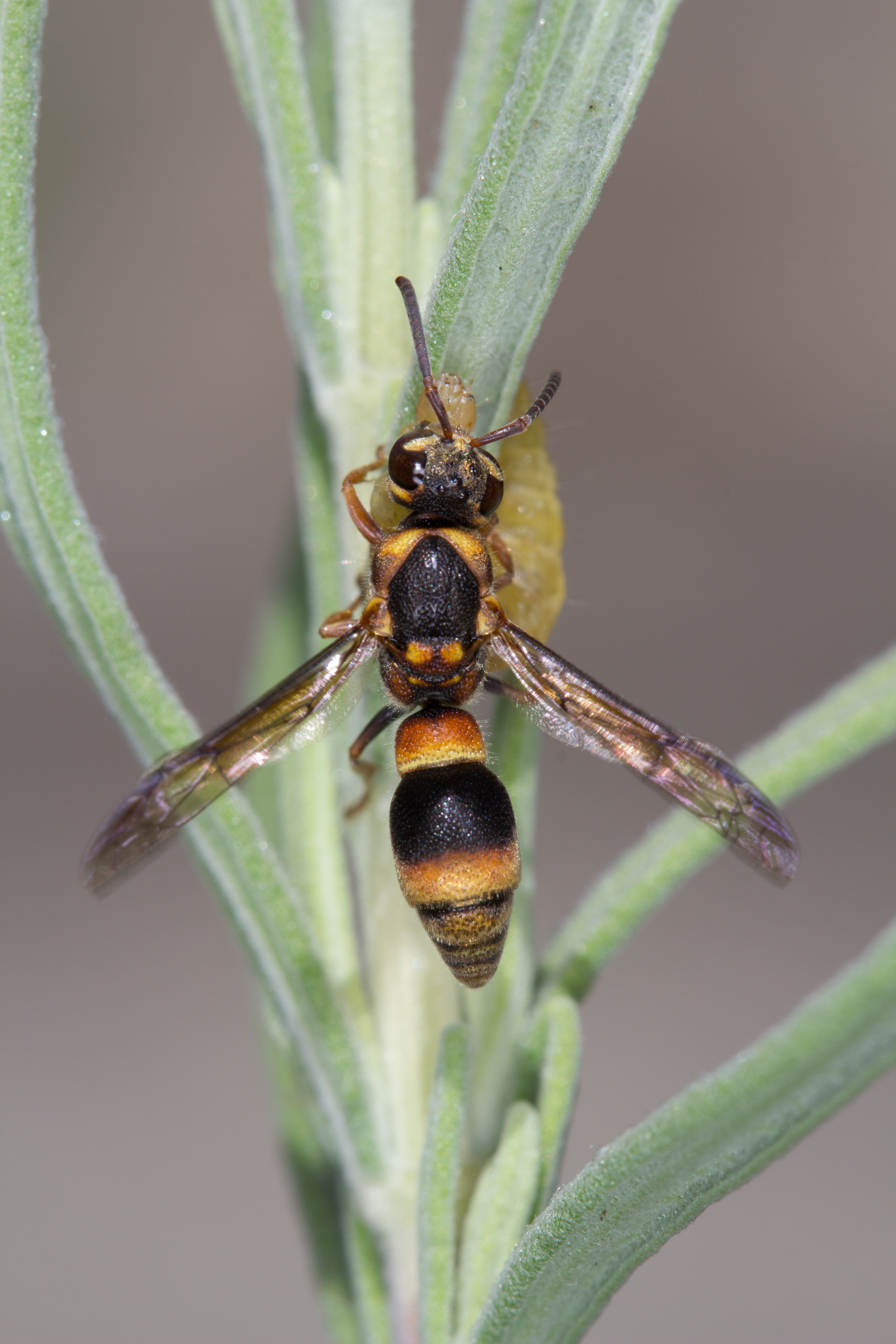
- Paralastor sp

Scientific classification
- Kingdom: Animalia
- Phylum: Arthropoda
- Clade: Pancrustacea
- Class: Insecta
- Order: Hymenoptera
- Family: Vespidae
- Subfamily: Eumeninae
- Genus: Paralastor; Saussure, 1856

Type species
- Paralastor tuberculatus (Saussure, 1853

Species
- See text

= Paralastor =

Genus of wasps

Paralastor is a large genus of potter wasps.

== Range and distribution ==
Paralastor species occur in Oceania and the Moluccas with the majority of the species being from Australia.

== Species ==
The following species are currently classified within the genus Paralastor:

- Paralastor abnormis (Bingham, 1912)
- Paralastor aequifasciatus Perkins, 1914
- Paralastor alastoripennis (Saussure, 1853)
- Paralastor albifrons (Fabricius, 1775)
- Paralastor alexandriae Perkins, 1914
- Paralastor anostreptus Perkins, 1914
- Paralastor arenicola Perkins, 1914
- Paralastor argentifrons (Smith, 1857)
- Paralastor argyrias Perkins, 1914
- Paralastor aterrimus Turner, 1919
- Paralastor atripennis Perkins, 1914
- Paralastor aurocinctus (Guérin, 1831)
- Paralastor auster Perkins, 1914
- Paralastor australis (Saussure, 1853)
- Paralastor bicarinatus Perkins, 1914
- Paralastor bischoffi Giordani Soika, 1961
- Paralastor brisbanensis Perkins, 1914
- Paralastor brunneus (Saussure, 1856)
- Paralastor caprai Giordani Soika, 1977
- Paralastor carinatus (Smith, 1857)
- Paralastor clotho (Lepeletier, 1841)
- Paralastor clypeopunctatus Schulthess-Rechberg, 1925
- Paralastor commutatus Perkins, 1914
- Paralastor comptus Perkins, 1914
  - Paralastor comptus comptus Perkins, 1914
  - Paralastor comptus rubescens Perkins, 1914
- Paralastor conspiciendus Perkins, 1914
- Paralastor conspicuus Perkins, 1914
- Paralastor constrictus Perkins, 1914
- Paralastor cruentatus (Saussure, 1867)
- Paralastor cruentus (Saussure, 1855)
- Paralastor darwinianus Perkins, 1914
- Paralastor debilis Perkins, 1914
- Paralastor debilitatus Perkins, 1914
- Paralastor dentiger Perkins, 1914
- Paralastor despectus Perkins, 1914
- Paralastor diabolicus Turner, 1919
- Paralastor diadema Rayment, 1954
- Paralastor donatus Perkins, 1914
- Paralastor dubiosus Perkins, 1914
- Paralastor dyscritias Perkins, 1914
- Paralastor emarginatus (Saussure, 1853)
- Paralastor eriurgus (Saussure, 1853)
- Paralastor euclidias Perkins, 1914
- Paralastor eugonias Perkins, 1914
- Paralastor eustomus Perkins, 1914
- Paralastor eutretus Perkins, 1914
- Paralastor fallax Perkins, 1914
- Paralastor flaviceps (Saussure, 1856)
- Paralastor frater Perkins, 1914
- Paralastor fraternus (Saussure, 1856)
- Paralastor hilaris Perkins, 1914
- Paralastor icarioides Perkins, 1914
- Paralastor ignotus Perkins, 1914
- Paralastor imitator Perkins, 1914
- Paralastor infernalis (Saussure, 1856)
- Paralastor infimus Perkins, 1914
- Paralastor insularis (Saussure, 1856)
- Paralastor katherinensis Borsato, 2003
- Paralastor lachesis (Saussure, 1853)
- Paralastor laetus Perkins, 1914
- Paralastor lateritius (Saussure, 1867)
- Paralastor leptias Perkins, 1914
- Paralastor mackayensis Perkins, 1914
- Paralastor maculiventris (Saussure, 1856)
- Paralastor medius Perkins, 1914
- Paralastor mesochlorus Perkins, 1914
  - Paralastor mesochlorus mesochloroides Perkins, 1914
  - Paralastor mesochlorus mesochlorus Perkins, 1914
- Paralastor microgonias Perkins, 1914
- Paralastor mimus Perkins, 1914
- Paralastor mutabilis Perkins, 1914
- Paralastor nautarum (Saussure, 1856)
- Paralastor neglectus (Saussure, 1855)
- Paralastor neochromus Perkins, 1914
- Paralastor occidentalis Perkins, 1914
- Paralastor odynericornis Giordani Soika, 1961
- Paralastor odyneripennis Perkins, 1914
- Paralastor odyneroides Perkins, 1914
- Paralastor oloris Perkins, 1914
- Paralastor optabilis Perkins, 1914
- Paralastor ordinarius Perkins, 1914
- Paralastor orientalis Perkins, 1914
- Paralastor pallidus Perkins, 1914
- Paralastor parca (Saussure, 1853)
- Paralastor perkinsi Borsato 2003
- Paralastor petiolatus Schulthess-Rechberg, 1925
- Paralastor picteti (Saussure, 1853)
- Paralastor placens Perkins, 1914
- Paralastor plebeius Perkins, 1914
- Paralastor princeps Perkins, 1914
- Paralastor pseudochromus Perkins, 1914
- Paralastor punctulatus (Saussure, 1853)
- Paralastor pusillus (Saussure, 1856)
- Paralastor roseotinctus Perkins, 1914
- Paralastor rubroviolaceus (Giordani Soika, 1941)
- Paralastor rufipes Perkins, 1914
- Paralastor sanguineus (Saussure, 1856)
- Paralastor saussurei Perkins, 1914
- Paralastor semirufus Schulthess-Rechberg, 1925
- Paralastor simillimus Perkins, 1914
- Paralastor simplex Perkins, 1914
- Paralastor simulator Perkins, 1914
- Paralastor smithii (Saussure, 1856)
- Paralastor solitarius Perkins, 1914
- Paralastor subhabilis Perkins, 1914
- Paralastor submersus Turner, 1919
- Paralastor subobscurus Perkins, 1914
- Paralastor suboloris Perkins, 1914
- Paralastor subplebeius Perkins, 1914
- Paralastor subpunctulatus Perkins, 1914
- Paralastor summus Perkins, 1914
- Paralastor synchromus Perkins, 1914
- Paralastor tasmaniensis (Saussure, 1853)
- Paralastor tricarinulatus Perkins, 1914
- Paralastor tricolor Perkins, 1914
- Paralastor tridentatus (von Schulthess 1935)
- Paralastor tuberculatus (Saussure, 1853)
- Paralastor victor Giordani Soika, 1977
- Paralastor viduus Perkins, 1914
- Paralastor vulneratus (Saussure, 1856)
- Paralastor vulpinus (Saussure, 1856)
  - Paralastor vulpinus excisus Perkins, 1914
  - Paralastor vulpinus vulpinus (Saussure, 1856)
- Paralastor xanthochromus Perkins, 1914
- Paralastor xanthus Giordani Soika, 1977
- Paralastor xerophilus Perkins, 1914
  - Paralastor xerophilus meesi Giordani Soika, 1977
  - Paralastor xerophilus xerophilus Perkins, 1914
