= Stenomacrus =

Scientific classification
- Domain: Eukaryota
- Kingdom: Animalia
- Phylum: Arthropoda
- Class: Insecta
- Order: Hymenoptera
- Family: Ichneumonidae
- Genus: Stenomacrus; Förster, 1869

Genus of insects

Stenomacrus is a genus of parasitoid wasps belonging to the family Ichneumonidae.

The distribution of this genus is cosmopolitan.

== Species ==
The following species are recognised in the genus Stenomacrus:

- Stenomacrus affinitor Aubert, 1981
- Stenomacrus americanus (Ashmead, 1896)
- Stenomacrus anceps Szepligeti, 1898
- Stenomacrus atratus (Holmgren, 1858)
- Stenomacrus binotatus (Holmgren, 1858)
- Stenomacrus bispinus (Holmgren, 1858)
- Stenomacrus brevicubitus Kolarov, 1986
- Stenomacrus brevipennis (Ashmead, 1902)
- Stenomacrus californicus (Ashmead, 1896)
- Stenomacrus carbonariae Roman, 1939
- Stenomacrus caudatus (Holmgren, 1858)
- Stenomacrus celer (Holmgren, 1858)
- Stenomacrus cephalotes (Holmgren, 1858)
- Stenomacrus clypeatus Varga 2024
- Stenomacrus cognatus (Holmgren, 1858)
- Stenomacrus columbianus (Ashmead, 1896)
- Stenomacrus communis Varga 2024
- Stenomacrus cubiceps (Thomson, 1897)
- Stenomacrus curvicaudatus (Brischke, 1871)
- Stenomacrus curvulus (Thomson, 1897)
- Stenomacrus deletus (Thomson, 1897)
- Stenomacrus dendrolimi (Matsumura, 1926)
- Stenomacrus difficilis Jussila, 1996
- Stenomacrus dubiosus (Ashmead, 1902)
- Stenomacrus exserens (Thomson, 1898)
- Stenomacrus exsertor Aubert, 1981
- Stenomacrus flaviceps (Gravenhorst, 1829)
- Stenomacrus glabratus Varga 2024
- Stenomacrus groenlandicus Jussila, 1996
- Stenomacrus hastatus (Holmgren, 1858)
- Stenomacrus hilaris (Holmgren, 1883)
- Stenomacrus holmgreni (Kirchner, 1867)
- Stenomacrus incisus (Gravenhorst, 1829)
- Stenomacrus inferior Aubert, 1981
- Stenomacrus innotatus (Thomson, 1897)
- Stenomacrus kincaidi (Ashmead, 1902)
- Stenomacrus laminatus Szepligeti, 1898
- Stenomacrus lankesterae Kittel, 2016
- Stenomacrus laricis (Haliday, 1838)
- Stenomacrus laticollis (Holmgren, 1883)
- Stenomacrus longipes Jussila, 1996
- Stenomacrus luteus Varga 2024
- Stenomacrus meijeri Woelke, Pham & Humala, 2020
- Stenomacrus mellipes (Provancher, 1888)
- Stenomacrus merula (Gravenhorst, 1829)
- Stenomacrus micropennis Jussila, 2006
- Stenomacrus minutissimus (Zetterstedt, 1838)
- Stenomacrus minutor Aubert, 1981
- Stenomacrus molestus (Holmgren, 1858)
- Stenomacrus monticola (Cushman, 1922)
- Stenomacrus nemoralis (Holmgren, 1858)
- Stenomacrus obliquus Statz, 1936
- Stenomacrus ochripes (Holmgren, 1858)
- Stenomacrus pallipes (Holmgren, 1858)
- Stenomacrus palustris (Holmgren, 1858)
- Stenomacrus payet Rousse & Villemant, 2012
- Stenomacrus pedestris (Holmgren, 1869)
- Stenomacrus pexatus (Holmgren, 1858)
- Stenomacrus premitus (Davis, 1897)
- Stenomacrus pusillator Aubert, 1981
- Stenomacrus pygmaeus Y.u.Horstmann, 1999
- Stenomacrus rivosus (Holmgren, 1883)
- Stenomacrus silvaticus (Holmgren, 1858)
- Stenomacrus solidatus (Brues, 1910)
- Stenomacrus solitarius (Holmgren, 1883)
- Stenomacrus superus (Thomson, 1897)
- Stenomacrus terebrator Roman, 1934
- Stenomacrus terrestris Roman, 1926
- Stenomacrus tuberculatus Kolarov, 1986
- Stenomacrus ulmicola (Ashmead, 1896)
- Stenomacrus undulatus (Davis, 1897)
- Stenomacrus ungula (Thomson, 1897)
- Stenomacrus vafer (Holmgren, 1858)
- Stenomacrus validicornis (Boheman, 1866)
- Stenomacrus variabilis (Ashmead, 1894)
- Stenomacrus varius (Holmgren, 1858)
- Stenomacrus vitripennis (Holmgren, 1858)
- Stenomacrus zaykovi Kolarov, 1986
- BOLD:AAB4997 (Stenomacrus sp.)
- BOLD:AAC1404 (Stenomacrus sp.)
- BOLD:AAC3396 (Stenomacrus sp.)
- BOLD:AAD0179 (Stenomacrus sp.)
- BOLD:AAD0219 (Stenomacrus sp.)
- BOLD:AAD0245 (Stenomacrus sp.)
- BOLD:AAD8052 (Stenomacrus sp.)
- BOLD:AAE2018 (Stenomacrus sp.)
- BOLD:AAE9001 (Stenomacrus sp.)
- BOLD:AAE9002 (Stenomacrus sp.)
- BOLD:AAF3467 (Stenomacrus sp.)
- BOLD:AAF3476 (Stenomacrus sp.)
- BOLD:AAF3664 (Stenomacrus sp.)
- BOLD:AAG0952 (Stenomacrus sp.)
- BOLD:AAG0974 (Stenomacrus sp.)
- BOLD:AAG0976 (Stenomacrus sp.)
- BOLD:AAG0980 (Stenomacrus sp.)
- BOLD:AAG0982 (Stenomacrus sp.)
- BOLD:AAG8257 (Stenomacrus sp.)
- BOLD:AAH1490 (Stenomacrus sp.)
- BOLD:AAH1493 (Stenomacrus sp.)
- BOLD:AAH1500 (Stenomacrus sp.)
- BOLD:AAH1508 (Stenomacrus sp.)
- BOLD:AAH1571 (Stenomacrus sp.)
- BOLD:AAH1609 (Stenomacrus sp.)
- BOLD:AAH1610 (Stenomacrus sp.)
- BOLD:AAH1623 (Stenomacrus sp.)
- BOLD:AAH1632 (Stenomacrus sp.)
- BOLD:AAH1710 (Stenomacrus sp.)
- BOLD:AAH1782 (Stenomacrus sp.)
- BOLD:AAH1785 (Stenomacrus sp.)
- BOLD:AAH1823 (Stenomacrus sp.)
- BOLD:AAH9934 (Stenomacrus sp.)
- BOLD:AAJ5372 (Stenomacrus sp.)
- BOLD:AAJ5384 (Stenomacrus sp.)
- BOLD:AAM7533 (Stenomacrus sp.)
- BOLD:AAP6689 (Stenomacrus sp.)
- BOLD:AAU8210 (Stenomacrus sp.)
- BOLD:AAU8582 (Stenomacrus sp.)
- BOLD:AAU8582 (Stenomacrus sp.)
- BOLD:AAU9772 (Stenomacrus sp.)
- BOLD:AAU9773 (Stenomacrus sp.)
- BOLD:AAU9777 (Stenomacrus sp.)
- BOLD:AAZ0181 (Stenomacrus sp.)
- BOLD:AAZ0832 (Stenomacrus sp.)
- BOLD:ABA6031 (Stenomacrus sp.)
- BOLD:ABX8297 (Stenomacrus sp.)
- BOLD:ACB2448 (Stenomacrus sp.)
- BOLD:ACC0639 (Stenomacrus sp.)
- BOLD:ACC1987 (Stenomacrus sp.)
- BOLD:ACC4455 (Stenomacrus sp.)
- BOLD:ACC6839 (Stenomacrus sp.)
- BOLD:ACC7160 (Stenomacrus sp.)
- BOLD:ACC7954 (Stenomacrus sp.)
- BOLD:ACD1949 (Stenomacrus sp.)
- BOLD:ACD6520 (Stenomacrus sp.)
- BOLD:ACD8497 (Stenomacrus sp.)
- BOLD:ACE4848 (Stenomacrus sp.)
- BOLD:ACF9868 (Stenomacrus sp.)
- BOLD:ACG2500 (Stenomacrus sp.)
- BOLD:ACG3877 (Stenomacrus sp.)
- BOLD:ACG4370 (Stenomacrus sp.)
- BOLD:ACG7128 (Stenomacrus sp.)
- BOLD:ACM2072 (Stenomacrus sp.)
- BOLD:ACN3086 (Stenomacrus sp.)
- BOLD:ACO0741 (Stenomacrus sp.)
- BOLD:ACO5469 (Stenomacrus sp.)
- BOLD:ACP7752 (Stenomacrus sp.)
- BOLD:ACP9744 (Stenomacrus sp.)
- BOLD:ACQ7194 (Stenomacrus sp.)
- BOLD:ACR0086 (Stenomacrus sp.)
- BOLD:ACS5323 (Stenomacrus sp.)
- BOLD:ACU2014 (Stenomacrus sp.)
- BOLD:ACU2214 (Stenomacrus sp.)
- BOLD:ACU9087 (Stenomacrus sp.)
- BOLD:ACV1717 (Stenomacrus sp.)
- BOLD:ACX8957 (Stenomacrus sp.)
- BOLD:ACY8214 (Stenomacrus sp.)
- BOLD:ADE2391 (Stenomacrus sp.)
- BOLD:ADK9855 (Stenomacrus sp.)
- BOLD:ADT5878 (Stenomacrus sp.)
- BOLD:ADT8836 (Stenomacrus sp.)
- BOLD:AEC6961 (Stenomacrus sp.)
