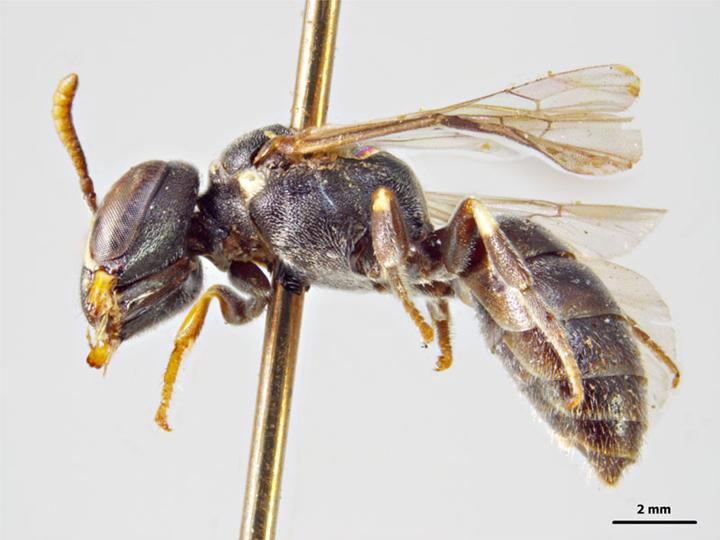
- Female

Scientific classification
- Kingdom: Animalia
- Phylum: Arthropoda
- Clade: Pancrustacea
- Class: Insecta
- Order: Hymenoptera
- Family: Colletidae
- Genus: Hylaeus
- Species: H. asperithorax

Binomial name
- Hylaeus asperithorax (Rayment, 1927)

Synonyms
- Euryglossa asperithorax Rayment, 1927

= Hylaeus asperithorax =

Species of bee

Hylaeus asperithorax, or Hylaeus (Prosopisteron) asperithorax, is a species of bee in the family Colletidae and subfamily Hylaeinae. It is endemic to Australia. It was described by Australian entomologist Tarlton Rayment in 1927.

== Description ==
Female body length is about 4 mm. Integumental colouration is mainly black, with paler markings. According to Rayment: "…the pale crescents, and the unique surface of the integument of the mesothorax, at once distinguishes this species."

== Distribution and habitat ==
The species occurs in south-eastern Australia. The type locality is Sandringham, Victoria. It has also been recorded from Woy Woy in New South Wales, as well as from Tasmania.

Goodenia ovata (hop goodenia), a forage plant of the bees

== Behaviour ==
The adults are flying mellivores. Flowering plants visited by the bees include Goodenia ovata and Olearia ramulosa, as well as Leptospermum, Melaleuca and Wahlenbergia species.

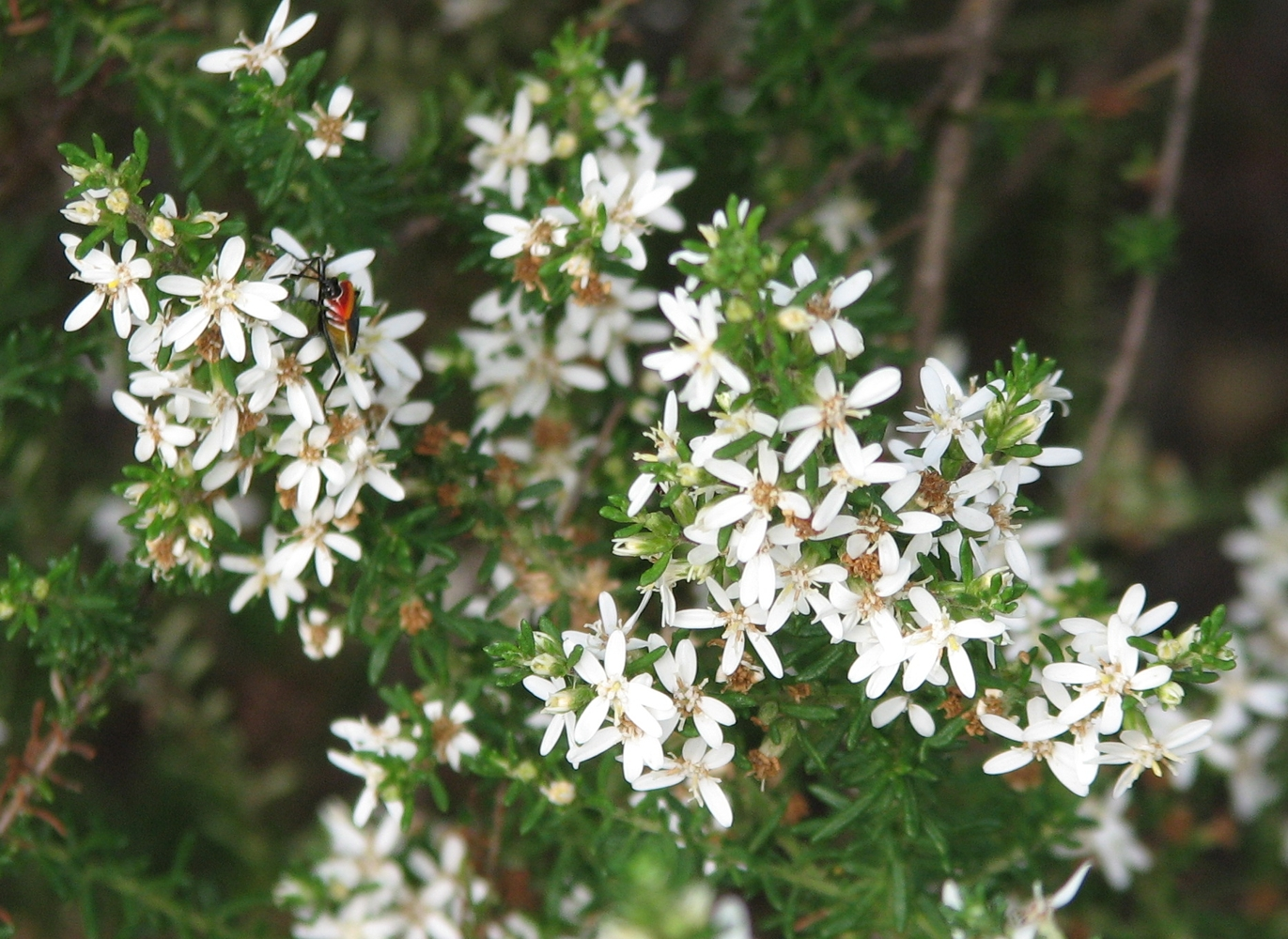
Olearia ramulosa (twiggy daisy-bush), a forage plant of the bees
