= Helictes =

Scientific classification
- Kingdom: Animalia
- Phylum: Arthropoda
- Clade: Pancrustacea
- Class: Insecta
- Order: Hymenoptera
- Family: Ichneumonidae
- Genus: Helictes; Haliday, 1837

Genus of insects

Helictes is a genus of parasitoid wasps belonging to the family Ichneumonidae.

The species of this genus are found in Europe, Northern America and New Zealand.

Species:

- Helictes borealis (Holmgren, 1857)
- Helictes carinalis Humala, 2007
