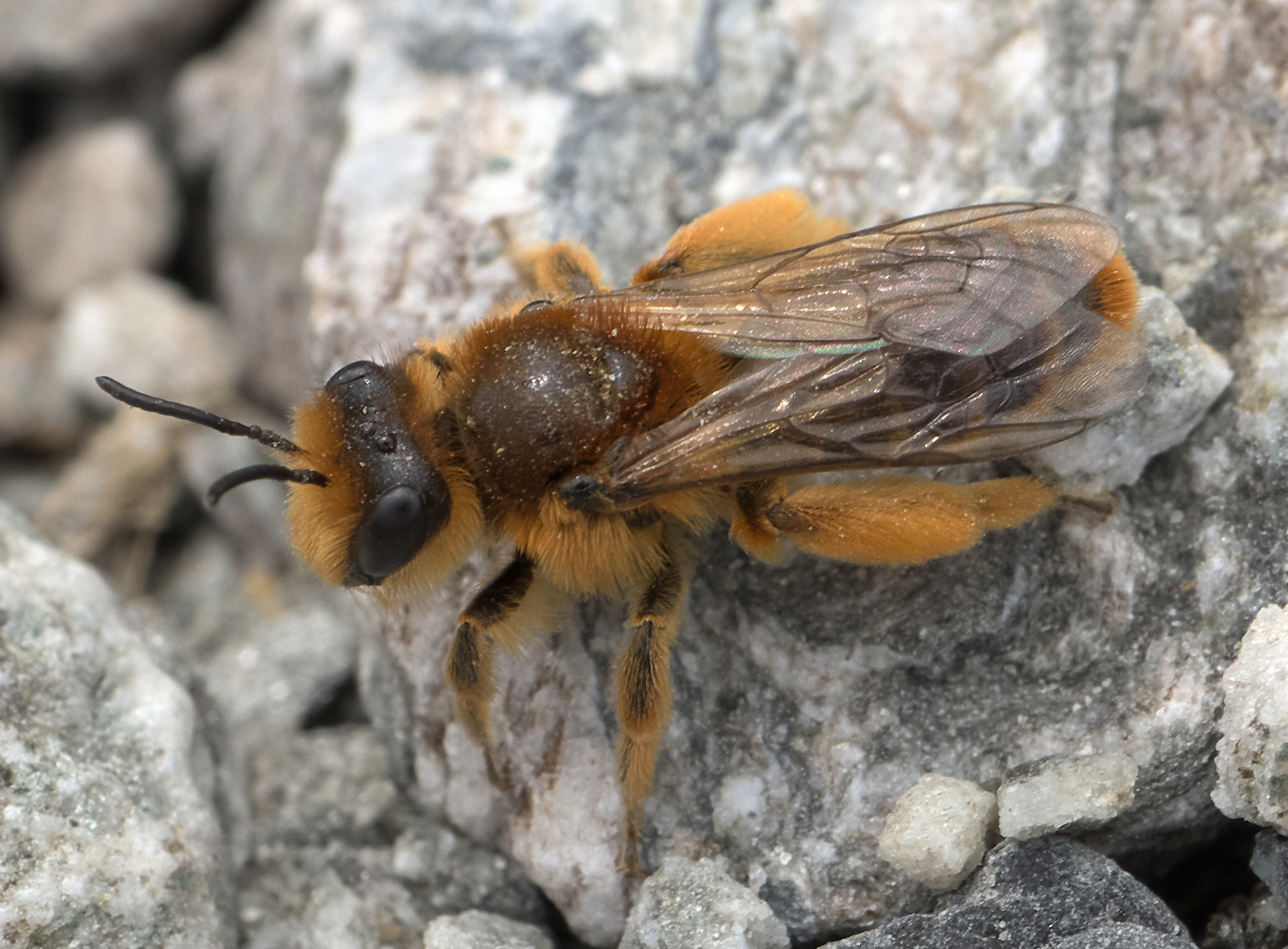

Scientific classification
- Kingdom: Animalia
- Phylum: Arthropoda
- Clade: Pancrustacea
- Class: Insecta
- Order: Hymenoptera
- Family: Colletidae
- Genus: Leioproctus
- Species: L. fulvescens

Binomial name
- Leioproctus fulvescens (Smith, 1876)

Synonyms
- Lamprocolletes fulvescens Smith, 1876; Dasycolletes hirtipes Smith, 1878; Paracolletes waterhousei Cockerell, 1905; Paracolletes hirtipes (Smith, 1878); Paracolletes fulvescens (Smith, 1876); Paracolletes opacior Cockerell, 1936; Leioproctus waterhousei (Cockerell, 1905)

= Leioproctus fulvescens =

Species of bee endemic to New Zealand

Leioproctus fulvescens is a species of solitary bee belonging to the family Colletidae. This bee is endemic to the South Island of New Zealand, and its yellow-orange hair distinguishes it from all other New Zealand species of Leioproctus.

== Name ==
The native solitary bees of pre-European New Zealand were collectively known by the Māori name ngaro huruhuru, ngaro being the generic word for wasp, bee, or large fly, and huruhuru the adjective for hairy or furry.

== Taxonomy ==
Leioproctus fulvescens was first formally described as Lamprocolletes fulvescens in 1876 by the English entomologist Frederick Smith. The types had been collected in the region of Canterbury by Charles Marcus Wakefield, son of Daniel Wakefield. This species is classified in the subgenus Nesocolletes of the large Australasian and temperate South American genus Leioproctus within the family Colletidae.

== Description ==
Leioproctus fulvescens adults are about 10 mm (0.39 in) long with a dense covering of hair, typically yellow to orange-brown in colour; this feature distinguishes them from other New Zealand Leioproctus species, which have white to cream hairs.

== Behaviour ==
Leioproctus fulvescens adults fly primarily in the spring and summer, with the majority of individuals being observed between November and March, though some have been observed as early as September. The bees nest underground in a variety of soil types, including beach sand, salt flats, dry river banks, clay, garden soil, and compacted dirt and shingle roads; nearly any soil type appears to be used so long as it is on relatively free of vegetation, has a relatively low level of moisture and a sunny aspect. Females prefer to build their nest tunnels in slightly sloping ground, and dig the main shaft anywhere from 100–500 mm (3.9–19.7 in) into the ground. Along the tunnel, there are often a number of side branches, each terminating in a single oval nesting chamber. The chamber is lined with a cellophane-like substance which reduces the amount of moisture that can enter the cell, providing a protective chamber for the larvae to develop. Each chamber is provisioned with a ball of pollen and nectar, on top of which a single egg is laid. Once completed, the chamber is sealed up with packed earth.

== Flower Visitors ==
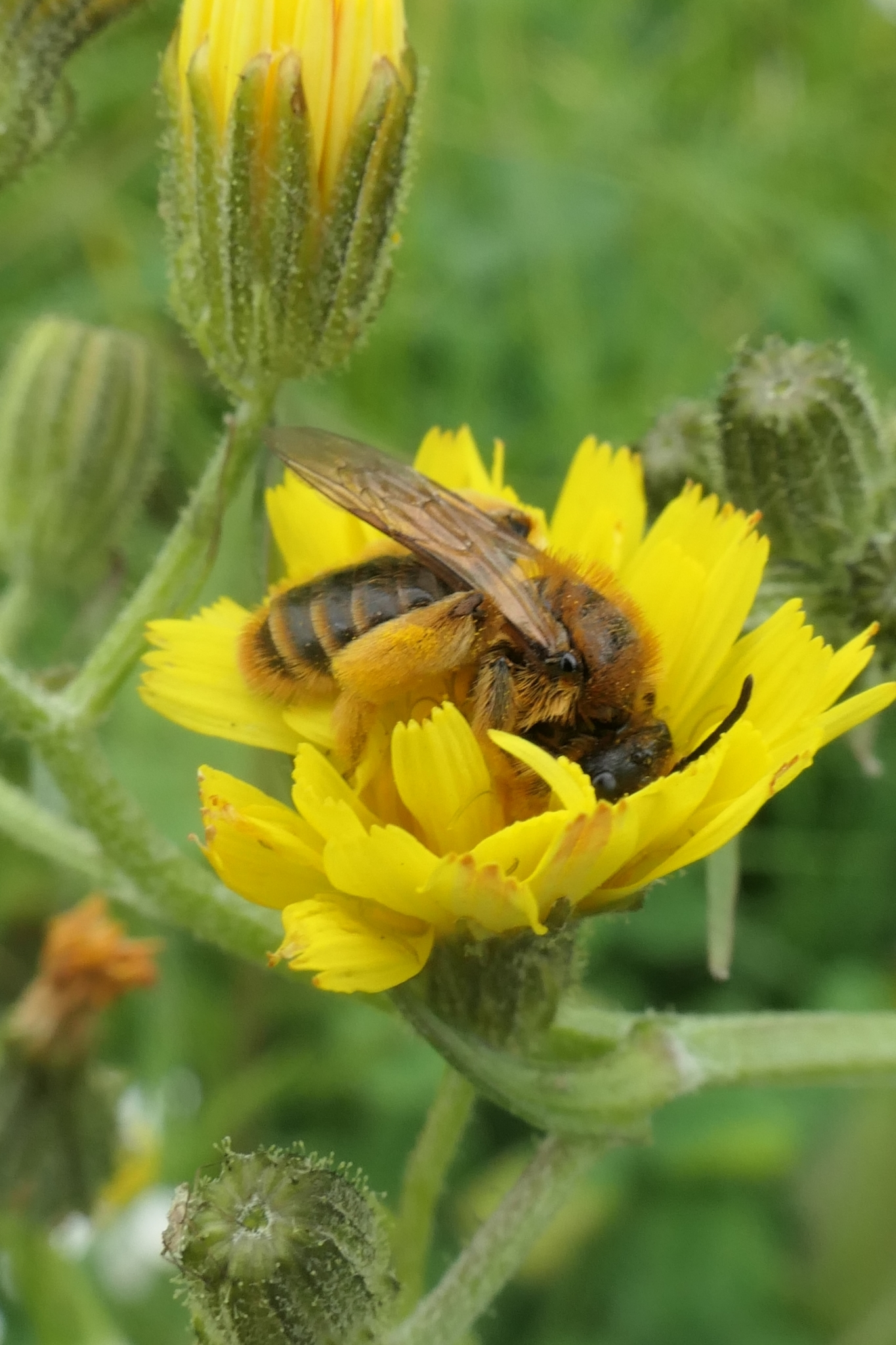

Like many other bees, Leioproctus fulvescens females are abundant flower visitors, using pollen and nectar as food source. They collect pollen onto a tuft of hair called a scopa on the hind tibia while on flowers and are able to forage up to 2 km from their nesting site if resources are limited. As this is a solitary bee species, they rely very heavily on this as a food source, in order to provide the nutrients essential for growth and development of bee larvae. Unlike many other bees, Leioproctus fulvescens are not generalist foragers, instead being more oligolectic leaning. While they do forage from a variety of floral species, including Raoulia, Olearia, Celmisia, as well as species such as Gentiana corymbifera (snow gentian) and some of the white flowered hebes such as Hebe subalpina, and even being found on in small numbers on carrot crops. However, they have been found to show a clear preference for Asteraceae species, both native, having been found only on two native Asteraceae plants, Brachyglottis greyi and Pachystegia insignis, and exotic, having been found only carrying Asteraceae pollen in a 2023 study with yarrow being their overall most preferred. There are multiple reasons for this, it reduces competition with other bees for food source, increases foraging efficiency on an abundant resource and improves reproduction through the protection of larvae from reduction in parasitism. While it is unknown how efficient Leioproctus fulvescens are as pollinators, it is likely they are vital to their local ecosystem. As there was a lack of what are seen as traditional pollinators, long tongued bees and butterflies, in New Zealand, short-tongued solitary bees like Leioproctus fulvescens are thought to play a vital role in pollination for native flora.

== Bug of the Year 2023 ==
Leioproctus fulvescens was awarded the title New Zealand Bug of the Year by the Entomological Society of New Zealand on 14 February 2023 after it gained the most votes in the inaugural Bug of the Year competition.
