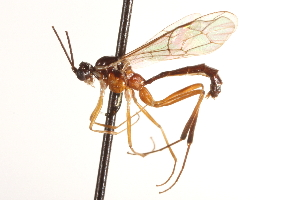
- Megastylus caseyi

Scientific classification
- Domain: Eukaryota
- Kingdom: Animalia
- Phylum: Arthropoda
- Class: Insecta
- Order: Hymenoptera
- Family: Ichneumonidae
- Genus: Megastylus; Schiodte, 1838

= Megastylus =

Genus of insects

Megastylus is a genus of parasitoid wasps belonging to the family Ichneumonidae.

The genus has cosmopolitan distribution.

Species:

- Megastylus aethiopicus Benoit, 1955
- Megastylus amoenus Dasch, 1992
