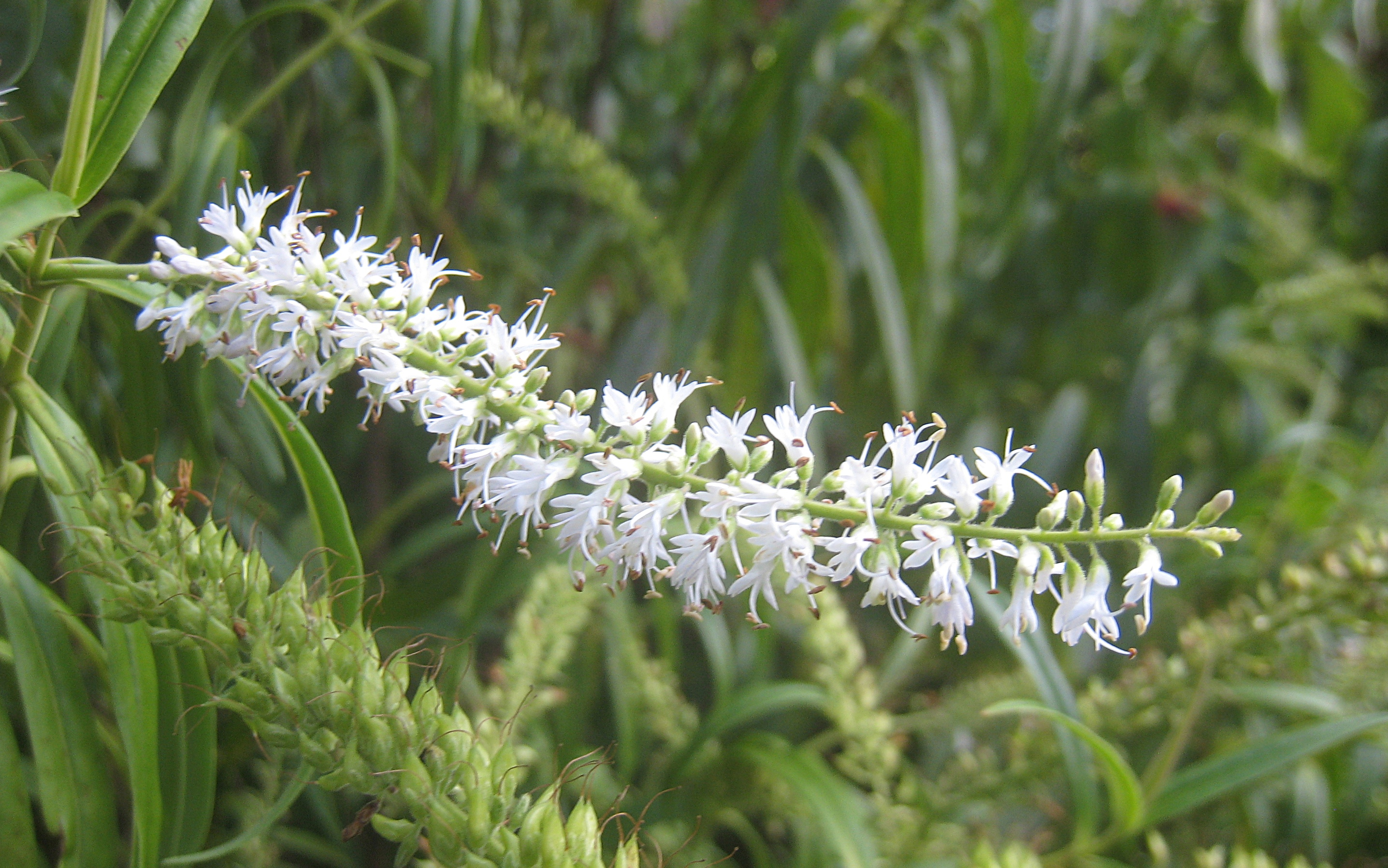

Scientific classification
- Kingdom: Plantae
- Clade: Tracheophytes
- Clade: Angiosperms
- Clade: Eudicots
- Clade: Asterids
- Order: Lamiales
- Family: Plantaginaceae
- Genus: Veronica
- Section: Veronica sect. Hebe
- Species: V. stricta

Binomial name
- Veronica stricta Banks & Sol. ex Benth.

Synonyms
- Of the species: Hebe salicifolia var. stricta (Banks & Sol. ex Benth.) Cockayne & Allan; Hebe stricta (Banks & Sol. ex Benth.) L.B.Moore; Veronica salicifolia var. stricta (Banks & Sol. ex Benth.) Hook.f.; Of V. stricta var. stricta: Hebe cookiana (Colenso) Cockayne & Allan; Hebe parkinsoniana (Colenso) Cockayne; Hebe salicifolia var. atkinsonii (Cockayne) Cockayne & Allan; Hebe salicifolia var. longiracemosa (Cockayne) Cockayne & Allan; Hebe stricta var. atkinsonii (Cockayne) L.B.Moore; Veronica cookiana Colenso; Veronica lindleyana Paxton; Veronica parkinsoniana Colenso; Veronica salicifolia var. atkinsonii Cockayne; Veronica salicifolia var. longiracemosa Cockayne

= Veronica stricta =

Koromiko

Species of flowering plant in the plantain family

Veronica stricta, synonym Hebe stricta, commonly called koromiko, is a flowering plant in the family Plantaginaceae, which is endemic to New Zealand.

Koromiko is a hebe found throughout the Mainland New Zealand, with long pale green leaves and tiny white flowers in summer formed into a dense inflorescence longer than the leaves. It is a hardy plant and does not tolerate shade. It prefers full sun and open habitats on edge of bush and wetlands as it tolerates wet areas.

Veronica stricta is the most commonly referred to plant that is called koromiko.

== Taxonomy ==
=== Varieties ===
As of October 2022, Plants of the World Online accepted four varieties:

- Veronica stricta var. egmontiana (L.B.Moore) Garn.-Jones – North Island
- Veronica stricta var. lata (L.B.Moore) Garn.-Jones – North Island
- Veronica stricta var. macroura (Hook.f. ex Benth.) Garn.-Jones – North Island
- Veronica stricta var. stricta – North and South Island

== Names ==
The plant is typically referred to as koromiko in Māori. Other regional names include kōkoromiko, koromuka, kōkoromuka and korohiko.

== Uses ==
Koromiko is a commonly used plant in traditional Māori rongoā medicine, by chewing or boiling leaf buds, or applied in balms. A sticky substance that is extruded from young leaf buds was traditionally mixed with blue pollen of Fuchsia excorticata for a form of make-up. During the early European colonial era, koromiko leaves or extract was sold under names such as Monk's Herbal Extract as an antidiarrheal remedy.

Other traditional uses included lining hāngī to impart a flavour to cooked meat, and using the twigs for fires to cook moa.

Koromiko is a pioneer plant useful to plant as a nurse crop for revegetation planting.
