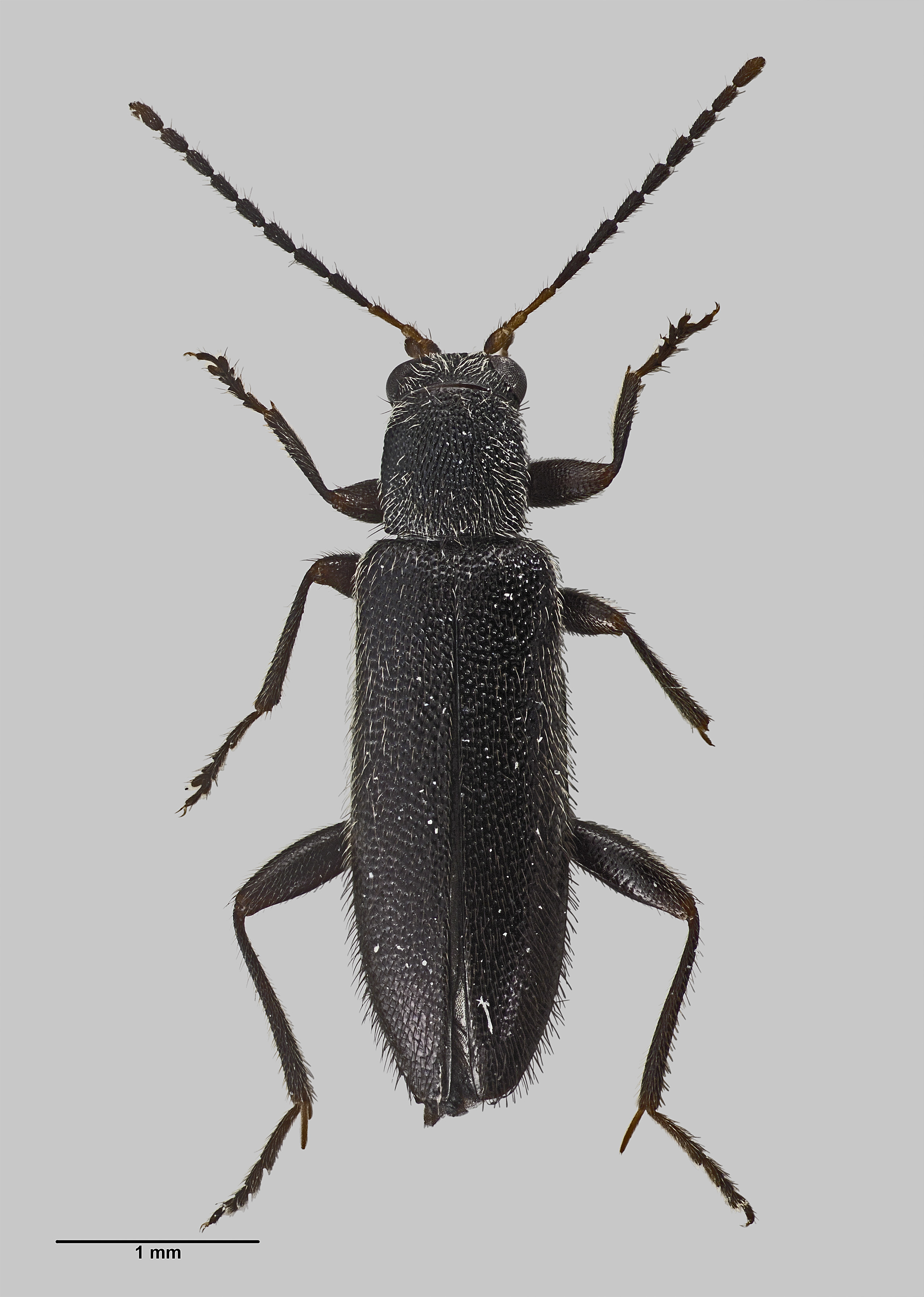
- Stenocyphon neozealandicus

Scientific classification
- Kingdom: Animalia
- Phylum: Arthropoda
- Clade: Pancrustacea
- Class: Insecta
- Order: Coleoptera
- Suborder: Polyphaga
- Infraorder: Elateriformia
- Family: Scirtidae
- Subfamily: Stenocyphoninae; Lawrence & Yoshitomi, 2007
- Genus: Stenocyphon; Lawrence, 2001

Species
- See text

= Stenocyphon =

Genus of beetles

Stenocyphon is a genus of marsh beetle belonging to the family Scirtidae. It is the only genus in the subfamily Stenocyphoninae. Two species are currently found within the genus, both of which are found in the Southern Hemisphere.

== Taxonomy ==
The genus was first identified by John F. Lawrence in 2001, who described a new species of marsh beetle native to inland Chile. The genus was monotypic until 2011, when a new species native to New Zealand, S. neozealandicus, was described by Rafał Ruta, Stephen Ernest Thorpe and Hiroyuki Yoshitomi. Undescribed members of this genus are also present in Australia.

== Species ==
- Stenocyphon neozealandicus Ruta, Thorpe & Yoshitomi, 2011
- Stenocyphon sasajii Lawrence, 2001
