= Adelurola =

Scientific classification
- Kingdom: Animalia
- Phylum: Arthropoda
- Clade: Pancrustacea
- Class: Insecta
- Order: Hymenoptera
- Family: Braconidae
- Subfamily: Alysiinae
- Genus: Adelurola; Strand, 1928

Genus of wasps

Adelurola is a genus of parasitoid wasps in the family Braconidae.

== Species ==
- Adelurola amplidens Fischer, 1966 (parasitoid of Pegomya hyoscyami, associated with Medicago sativa and Anethum graveolens)
- Adelurola asiatica Telenga, 1935
- Adelurola florimela Haliday, 1838 (parasitoid of Pegomya solennis, Tephritidae, and Anthomyiidae)
- Adelurola kamtshatica Belokobylskij, 1998
