= Xystus =

Xystus has several meanings:

- Xystus, a Greek architectural term denoting the covered portico of a gymnasium
- Xystus, another spelling for the Roman name Sixtus
- Pope Xystus I
- Pope Xystus II
- Pope Xystus III
- Pope Xystus IV
- Xystus, a Greek student of Pythagoreanism, author of the Sentences of Sextus
- Xystus, a taxonomic synonym of Alloxysta, a genus of wasps
- Xystus (weevil), a genus of beetles in the tribe Apostasimerini
