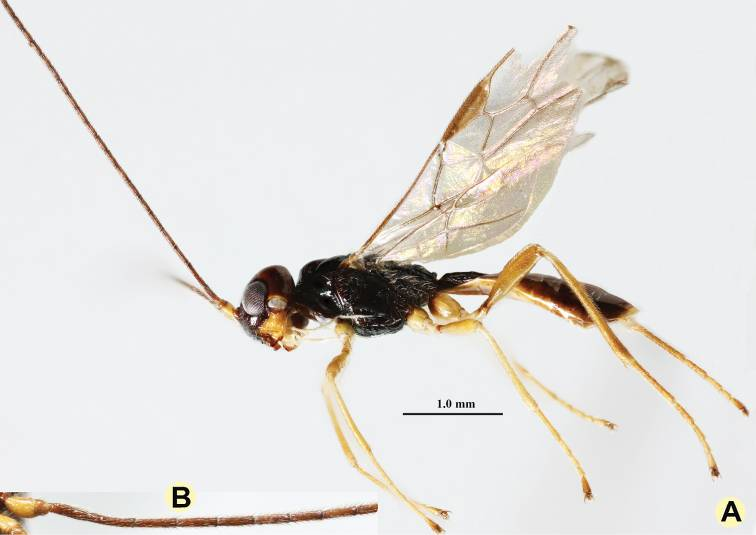
- Anamalysia vanhengstumi, a species of the genus

Scientific classification
- Kingdom: Animalia
- Phylum: Arthropoda
- Clade: Pancrustacea
- Class: Insecta
- Order: Hymenoptera
- Family: Braconidae
- Subfamily: Alysiinae
- Tribe: Alysiini
- Genus: Anamalysia van Achterberg, 2022

Type species
- Anamalysia idiastimorpha van Achterberg, 2022

Species
- Anamalysia idiastimorpha; Anamalysia knekosoma; Anamalysia mellipes; Anamalysia transversator; Anamalysia triangulum; Anamalysia urbana; Anamalysia vandervechti; Anamalysia vanhengstumi

Synonyms
- Alysiasta sensu Fischer (2006), in part; Coelalysia sensu Fischer (1988), in part

= Anamalysia =

Genus of parasitoid wasps

Anamalysia is a genus of parasitoid wasps in the family Braconidae and subfamily Alysiinae. It was established in 2022 for a group of alysiine wasps distributed across South and Southeast Asia, including India, Indonesia, Malaysia, Singapore, Thailand, Vietnam, and Laos. Members of the tribe Alysiini are typically koinobiont endoparasitoids of cyclorrhaphous dipteran larvae, although the biology of Anamalysia itself remains unknown.

== Taxonomy ==
The genus Anamalysia was described in 2022, with Anamalysia idiastimorpha designated as the type species. In the original description, six new species were described and two previously described species were transferred into the genus, bringing the total number of included species to eight. The generic name is derived from the Anamalai Hills in southern India, combined with the name Alysia.

=== Species ===
The genus includes the following species:

- Anamalysia idiastimorpha van Achterberg, 2022
- Anamalysia knekosoma van Achterberg & Yao, 2022
- Anamalysia mellipes van Achterberg & Yaakop, 2022
- Anamalysia transversator Yao & van Achterberg, 2022
- Anamalysia triangulum (Fischer, 2006)
- Anamalysia urbana (Papp, 1967)
- Anamalysia vandervechti van Achterberg & Yaakop, 2022
- Anamalysia vanhengstumi van Achterberg, 2022

== Description ==
Species of Anamalysia are small braconid wasps, approximately 3.3–5.5 mm in body length. They are generally dark brown, chestnut brown, or black, often with paler yellowish or brownish markings on the legs or metasoma. The genus is distinguished by a transverse head, a distinctly sculptured face, a narrow groove between the antennal socket and the eye, strongly widened mandibles, complete notauli, a narrow first subdiscal cell in the fore wing, and an ovipositor sheath that is rounded apically and lacks an apical spine.

== Biology ==
The biology of Anamalysia is unknown, but as a member of Alysiini it is likely associated with parasitoid development in cyclorrhaphous dipteran larvae.

== Distribution ==
Anamalysia is distributed in the Oriental realm. Recorded species localities include India, Indonesia, Malaysia, Singapore, Thailand, Vietnam, and Laos.

Known species distributions include:

- A. idiastimorpha – southern India
- A. knekosoma – Thailand
- A. mellipes – Malaysia and Indonesia
- A. transversator – Thailand
- A. triangulum – Malaysia, Laos, Indonesia, and Vietnam
- A. urbana – Singapore
- A. vandervechti – Indonesia (Sumatra)
- A. vanhengstumi – Vietnam

== Collection and study ==
Specimens used in the original description were collected mainly using Malaise traps, with some hand-collected material also examined. The study material is deposited in several institutions, including Naturalis Biodiversity Centre, Texas A&M University, Universiti Kebangsaan Malaysia, and the Queen Sirikit Botanic Garden.
