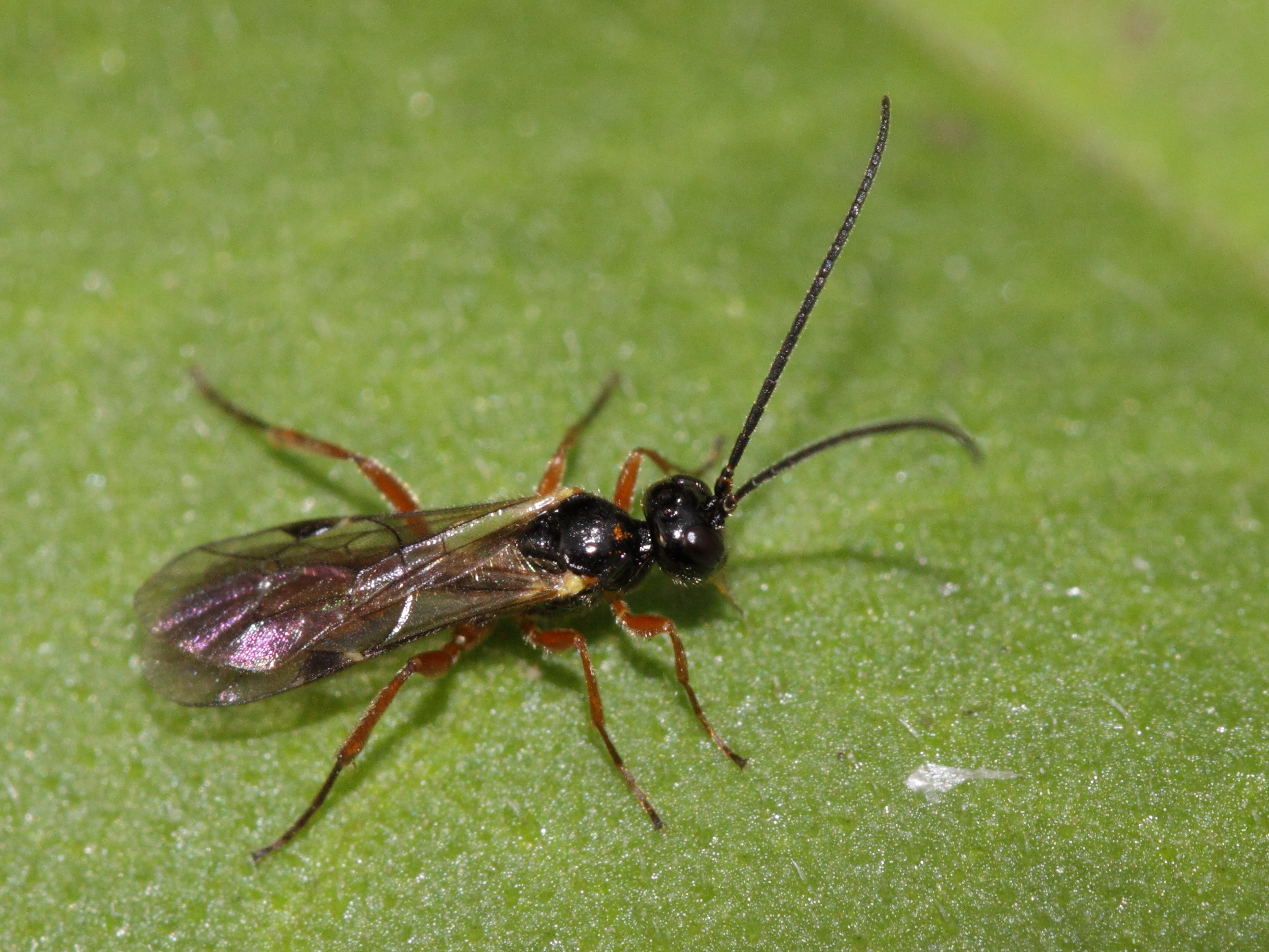

Scientific classification
- Kingdom: Animalia
- Phylum: Arthropoda
- Class: Insecta
- Order: Hymenoptera
- Family: Braconidae
- Subfamily: Alysiinae

Tribes
- Alysiini; Dacnusini

= Alysiinae =

Subfamily of wasps

The Alysiinae are a subfamily of braconid parasitoid wasps with over 1000 described species. Several species have been used in biocontrol programs. They are closely related to the Opiinae.

== Description and distribution ==
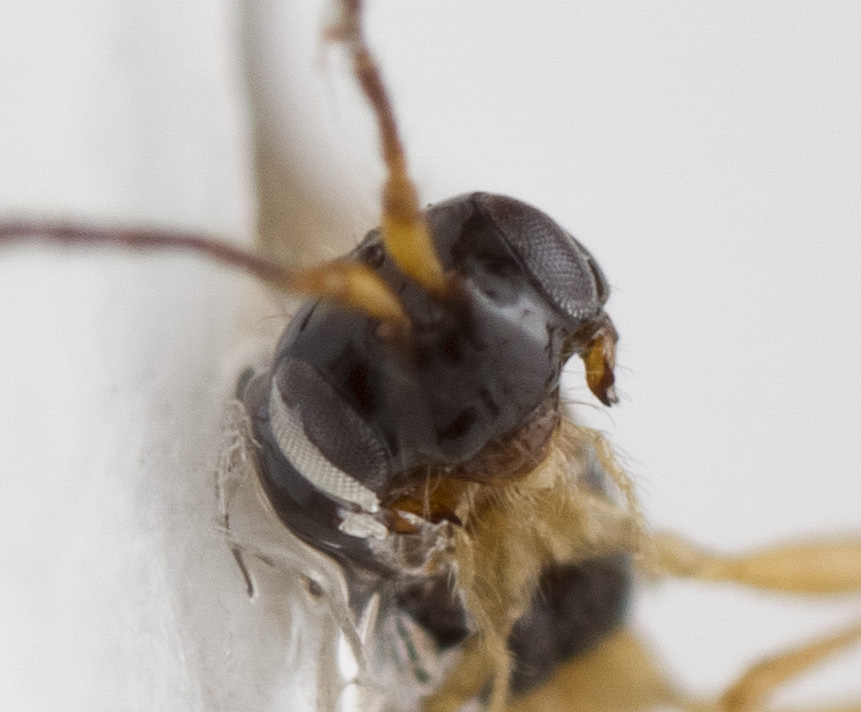
Head of an Alysiinae wasp. The exodont mandibles are visible.

Alysiinae are small wasps, usually under 5 mm long and black or brown in color. Their mandibles are exodont, opening outwards and not overlapping. This characteristic is essentially unique among braconids, with only a few rare exceptions (e.g., the genus Exodontiella in the subfamily Gnamptodontinae).

Alysiinae are found worldwide. They are "frequently seen whereever [sic?] decaying organic matter occurs."

== Biology ==
Alysiinae are koinobiont endoparasitoids of Cyclorrhapha Diptera. Females oviposit into host eggs or larvae. The host is allowed to develop until it forms a puparium, at which point it is killed by the wasp larva. The Alysiinae larva then pupates within the host puparium. Adults use their exodont mandibles to break free of the tough host puparium. Most species of Alysiinae are solitary, but a few are gregarious and lay multiple eggs within one host.

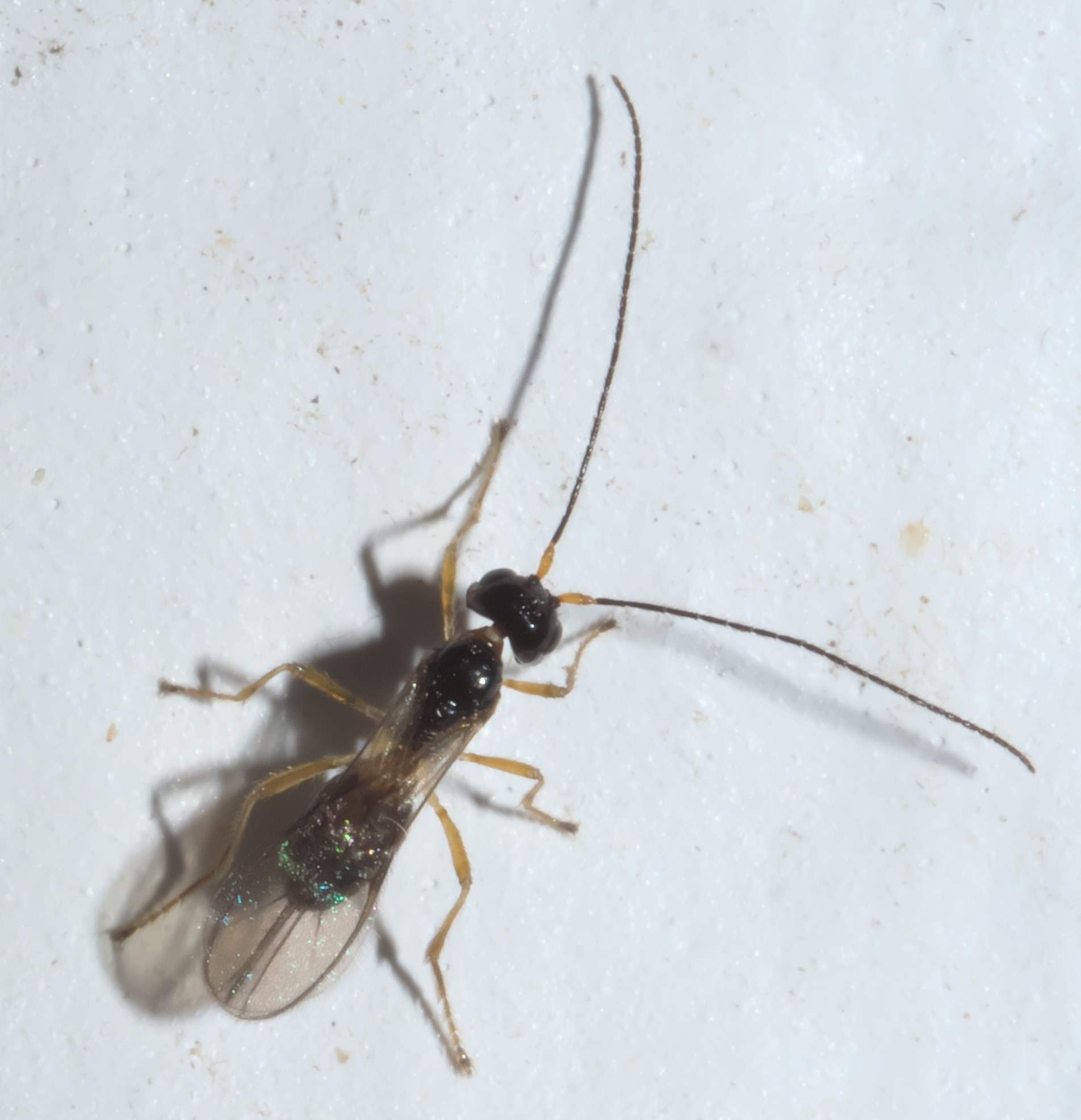

== Genera ==
These genera belong to the subfamily Alysiinae:

- Adelurola Strand, 1928
- Alloea Haliday, 1833^{c g}
- Alysia Latreille, 1804^{i c g b}
- Alysiasta Wharton, 1980^{c g b}
- Angelovia Zaykov, 1980^{c g}
- Aphaereta Förster, 1862^{c g b}
- Apronopa van Achterberg, 1980^{c g}
- Aristelix Nixon, 1943^{c g}
- Asobara Förster, 1862^{i c g b}
- Aspilota Foerster, 1863
- Asyntactus Marshall, 1896^{c g}
- Carinthilota Fischer, 1975^{c g}
- Chasmodon Haliday, 1838^{c g b}
- Chorebus Haliday, 1833^{i c g b}
- Coelinidea Viereck, 1913^{c g}
- Coelinius Nees von Esenbeck, 1818^{c g b} (coelinius nees)
- Coloneura Foerster, 1863
- Cratospila Förster, 1862^{c g}
- Dacnusa Haliday, 1833
- Dapsilarthra Förster, 1862^{c g b}
- Dinotrema Förster, 1862^{c g b}
- Epimicta Foerster, 1863
- Eucoelinidea Tobias, 1971^{c g}
- Eudinostigma Tobias, 1986^{c g}
- Exotela Foerster, 1863
- Grammospila Foerster, 1863
- Grandia Goidanich, 1936^{c g}
- Heterolexis Thomson, 1895
- Idiasta Foerster, 1863^{c g}
- Lodbrokia Hedqvist, 1962^{c g}
- Mesocrina Förster, 1862^{c g b}
- Oenonogastra Ashmead, 1900^{c g b}
- Orthostigma Ratzeburg, 1844^{c g b}
- Panerema Förster, 1862^{c g}
- Pentapleura Förster, 1862^{c g b}
- Phaenocarpa Förster, 1862^{i c g b}
- Phasmalysia Tobias, 1971^{c g}
- Polemochartus Shulz, 1911
- Protochorebus Perepetchayenko, 1997^{c g}
- Protodacnusa Griffiths, 1964^{c g}
- Pseudopezomachus Mantero, 1905^{c g}
- Pterusa Fischer, 1958^{c g}
- Regetus Papp, 1999^{c g}
- Sarops Nixon, 1942^{c g}
- Symphanes Förster, 1862^{c g}
- Synaldis Förster, 1862^{c g}
- Syncrasis Förster, 1862^{c g}
- Tanycarpa Förster, 1862^{c g}
- Tates Nixon, 1943^{c g}
- Terebrebus Tobias, 1999^{c g}
- Trachionus Haliday, 1833^{c g b}
- Trachyusa Ruthe, 1854^{c g}

Data sources: i = ITIS, c = Catalogue of Life, g = GBIF, b = Bugguide.net
