= Scorpiurus =

Scorpiurus may refer to:

- Scorpiurus, a genus of flies
- Scorpiurus, a genus of plants
