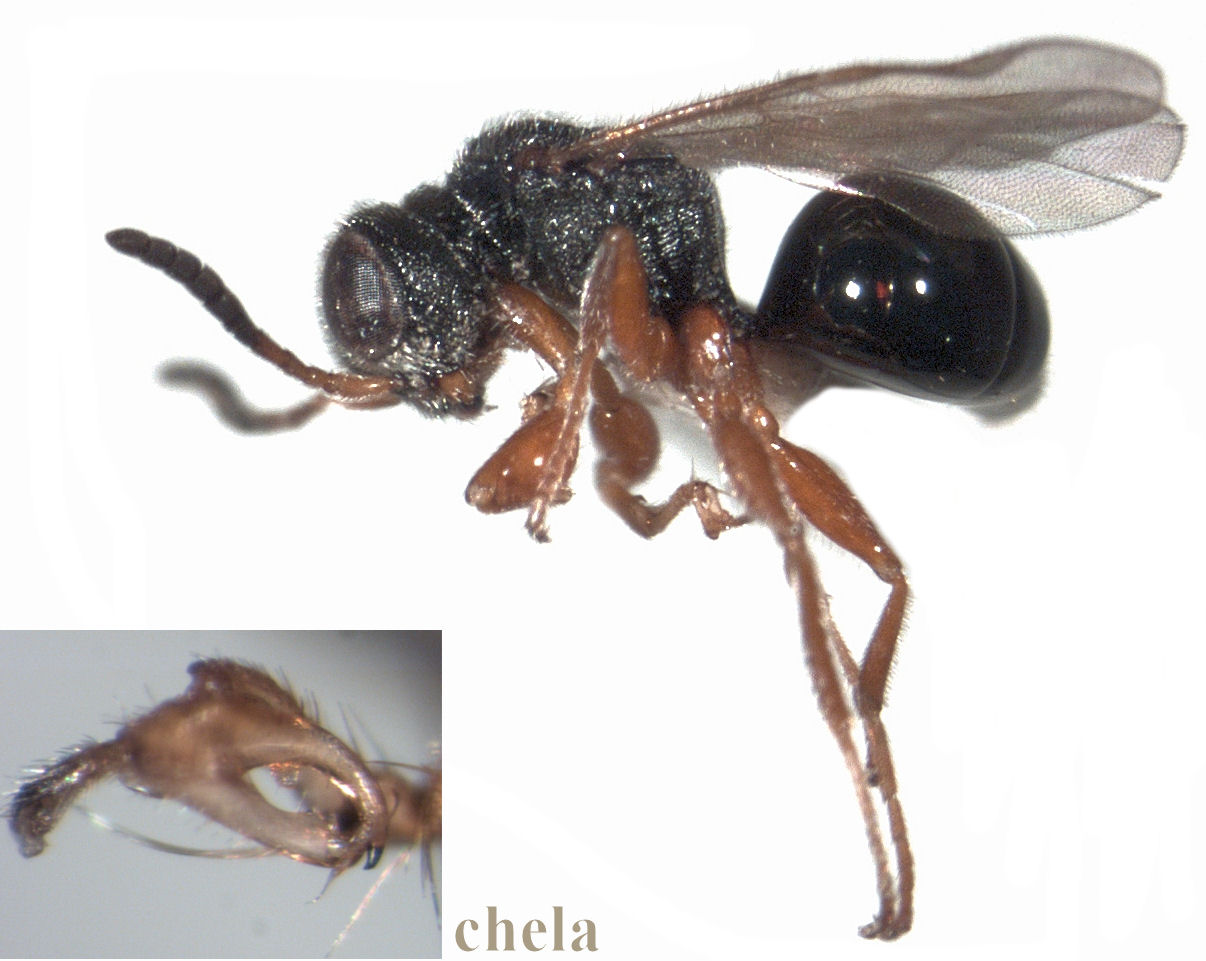
- Female specimen of Bocchus thorpei

Scientific classification
- Kingdom: Animalia
- Phylum: Arthropoda
- Clade: Pancrustacea
- Class: Insecta
- Order: Hymenoptera
- Family: Dryinidae
- Genus: Bocchus
- Species: B. thorpei

Binomial name
- Bocchus thorpei Olmi, 2007

= Bocchus thorpei =

Species of wasp

Bocchus thorpei is a species of wasp belonging to the family Dryinidae. The species was first described by Massimo Olmi in 2007, and is known to occur in New Zealand.

== Taxonomy ==
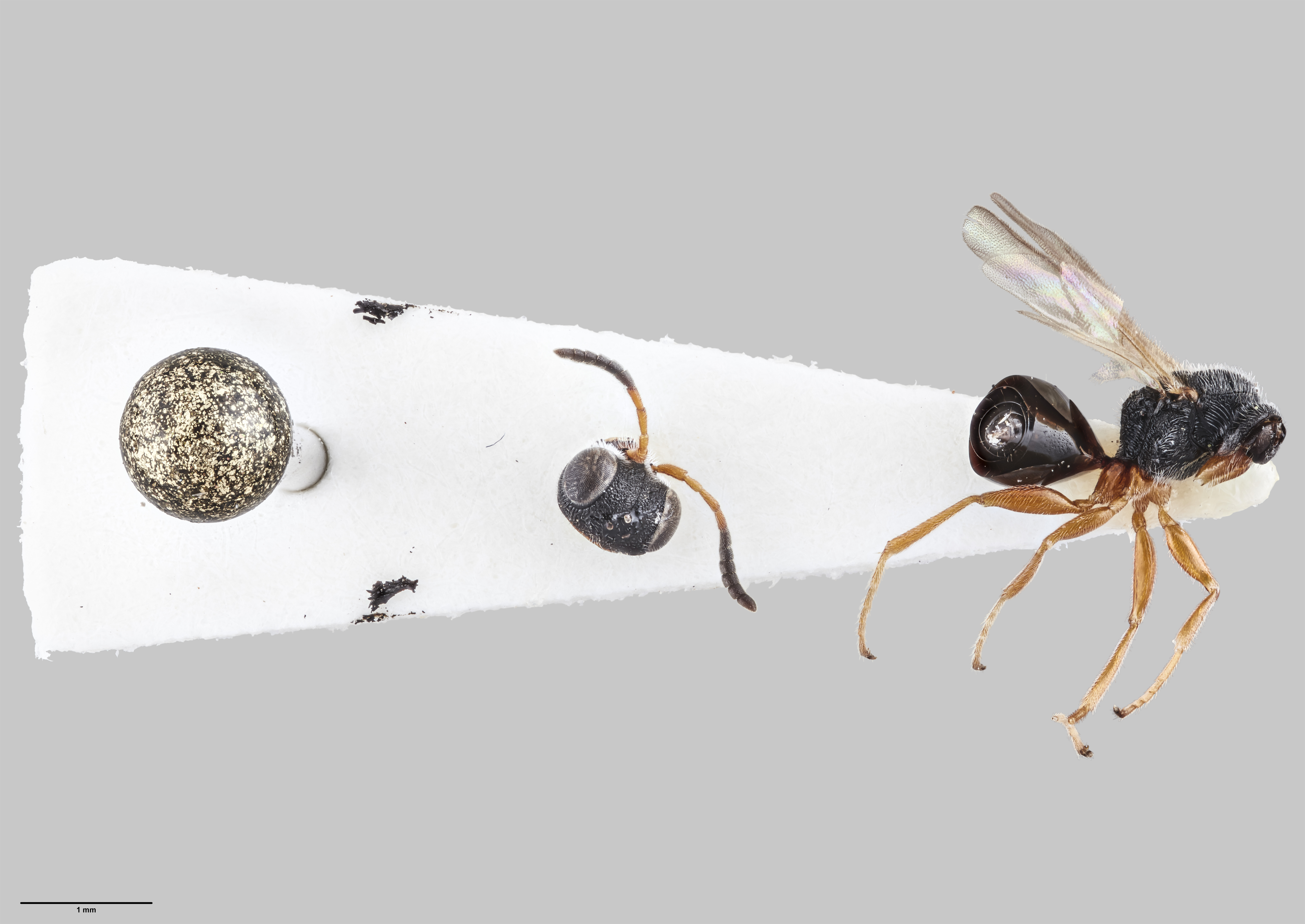
Holotype specimen from the Auckland War Memorial Museum collections

The species was described by Massimo Olmi in 2007, based on a holotype collected by Stephen E. Thorpe from the Auckland Domain in March 2005. Olmi named the species after Thorpe.

== Description ==
Females of the species measure between 2.81–3.50 mm (0.111–0.138 in), and have a black head and enlarged claws with a row of three subdistal teeth.

== Distribution and habitat ==
The species is found in the vicinity of Auckland, Tauranga and the Marlborough Sounds in New Zealand. As it is typically found in modified habitats near port cities, it is unclear whether the species is endemic or introduced to New Zealand, and it is suspected to be a species that originated in Australia. The host species of B. thorpei is unknown. Other species of Bocchus parasitise members of the family Issidae, however no species within this family have been recorded in New Zealand.
