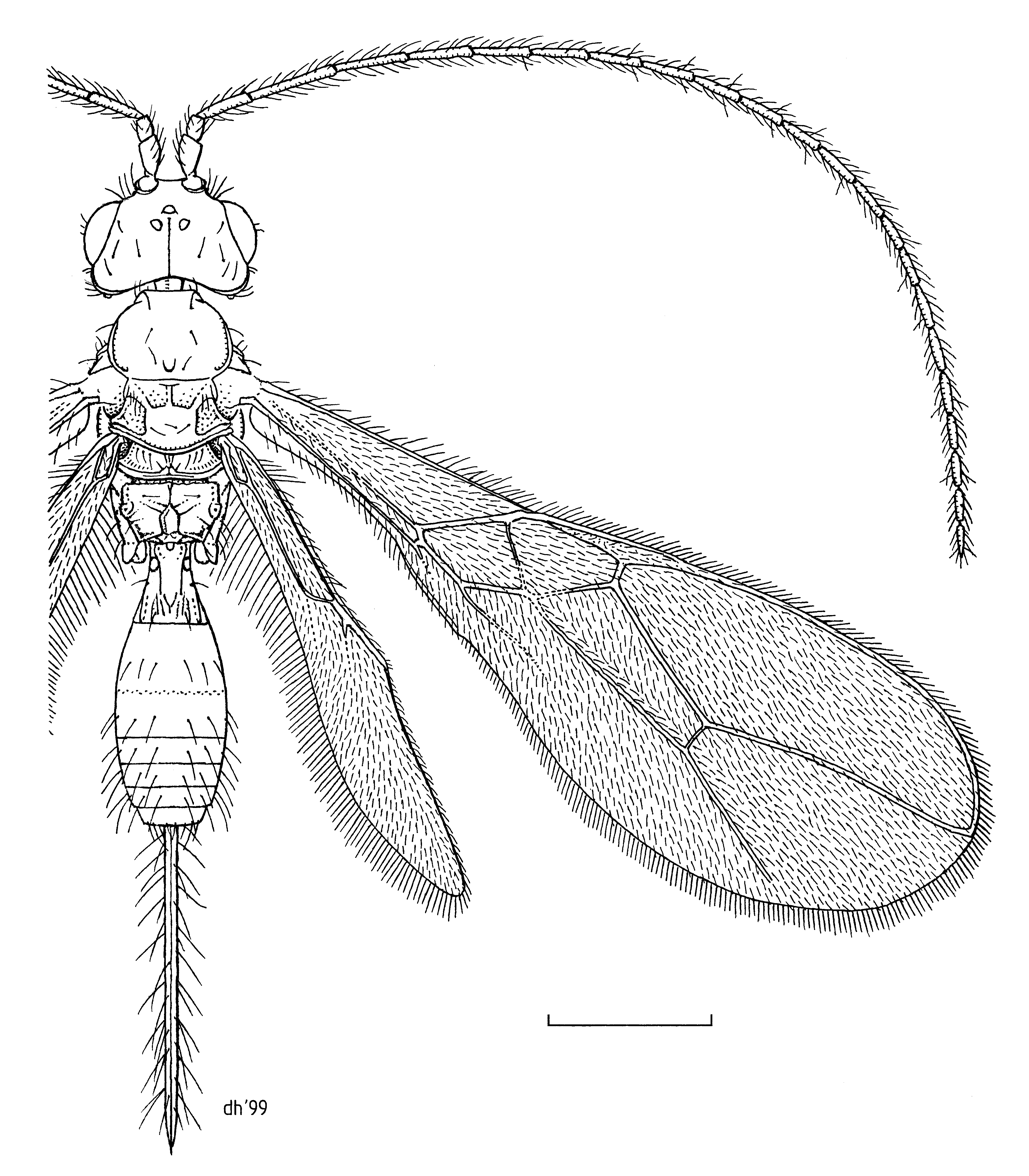
- Asobara ajbelli by Des Helmore

Scientific classification
- Kingdom: Animalia
- Phylum: Arthropoda
- Class: Insecta
- Order: Hymenoptera
- Family: Braconidae
- Subfamily: Alysiinae
- Tribe: Alysiini
- Genus: Asobara; Förster, 1862

= Asobara =

Genus of wasps

Asobara is a genus of parasitoid wasps in the family Braconidae. It contains around forty species. The genus is best known for the Drosophila parasitoid Asobara tabida, which is notable as both a model for parasitoid wasp infection in insects, and also as a representative of the hologenome theory of evolution. Asobara tabida is commensally infected with Wolbachia, and cannot reproduce in the absence of Wolbachia infection. As such, the genome of Asobara is directly tied to the genome of its commensal Wolbachia symbiont, and the two are considered to have a hologenome.
