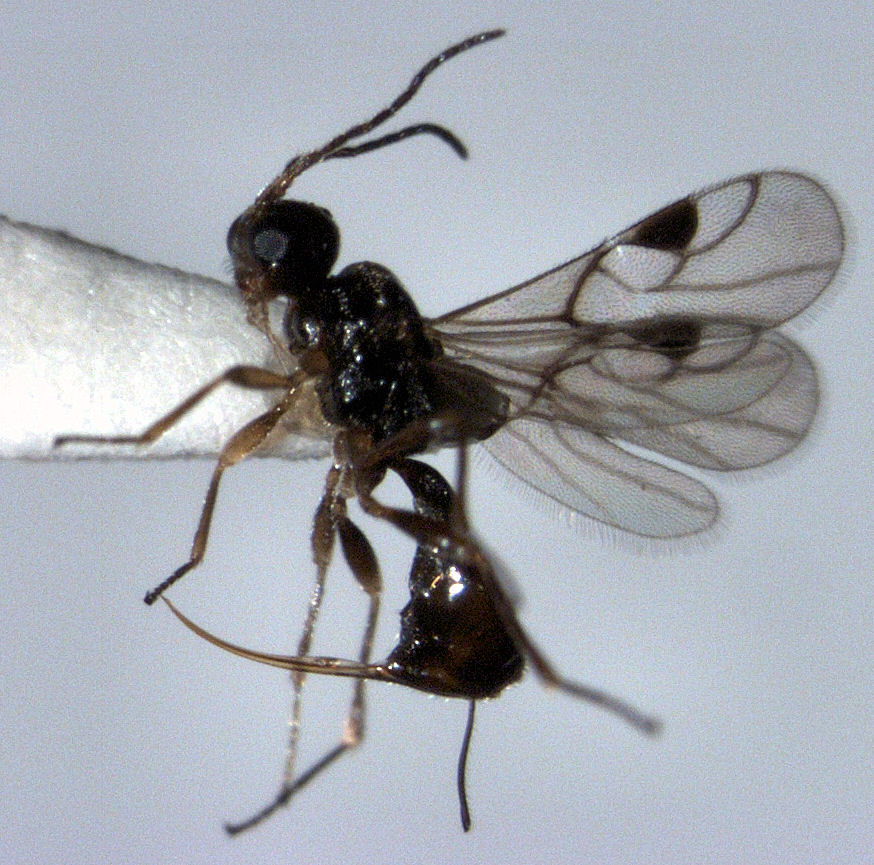
- Female specimen of Cryptoxilos thorpei

Conservation status
- Data Deficient (NZ TCS)

Scientific classification
- Domain: Eukaryota
- Kingdom: Animalia
- Phylum: Arthropoda
- Class: Insecta
- Order: Hymenoptera
- Family: Braconidae
- Genus: Cryptoxilos
- Species: C. thorpei

Binomial name
- Cryptoxilos thorpei Shaw & Berry, 2005

= Cryptoxilos thorpei =

Species of wasp

Cryptoxilos thorpei is a species of parasitoid wasp belonging to the family Braconidae. The species was first described by Scott R. Shaw and Jocelyn A. Berry in 2005, and is endemic to New Zealand.

== Taxonomy ==
The species was identified by Scott R. Shaw and Jocelyn A. Berry in 2005, based on a holotype collected by Stephen E. Thorpe from the Symonds Street Cemetery in central Auckland, New Zealand in 2003. The holotype was discovered on a dead species of Pittosporum infested by adult Chaetoptelius mundulus beetles. Shaw and Berry named the species after Thorpe.

== Description ==
Females of the species have a body length of 2.1 mm (0.083 in), and a forewing length of 1.7 mm (0.067 in). The species has wider eyes compared to C. convergens, and due to the propodeum of C. thorpei being covered with lacunose foveae.

== Behaviour ==
The species has a long ovipositor, which it uses to insert eggs directly forwards into host beetles. The species is also potentially protandrous, as males were observed emerging earlier than females.

== Distribution and habitat ==
The species is endemic to New Zealand, found in the vicinity of Auckland, New Zealand. Most specimens have been found in the vicinity of the Auckland City Centre, with some found in Kelston on the banks of the Whau River in West Auckland.
