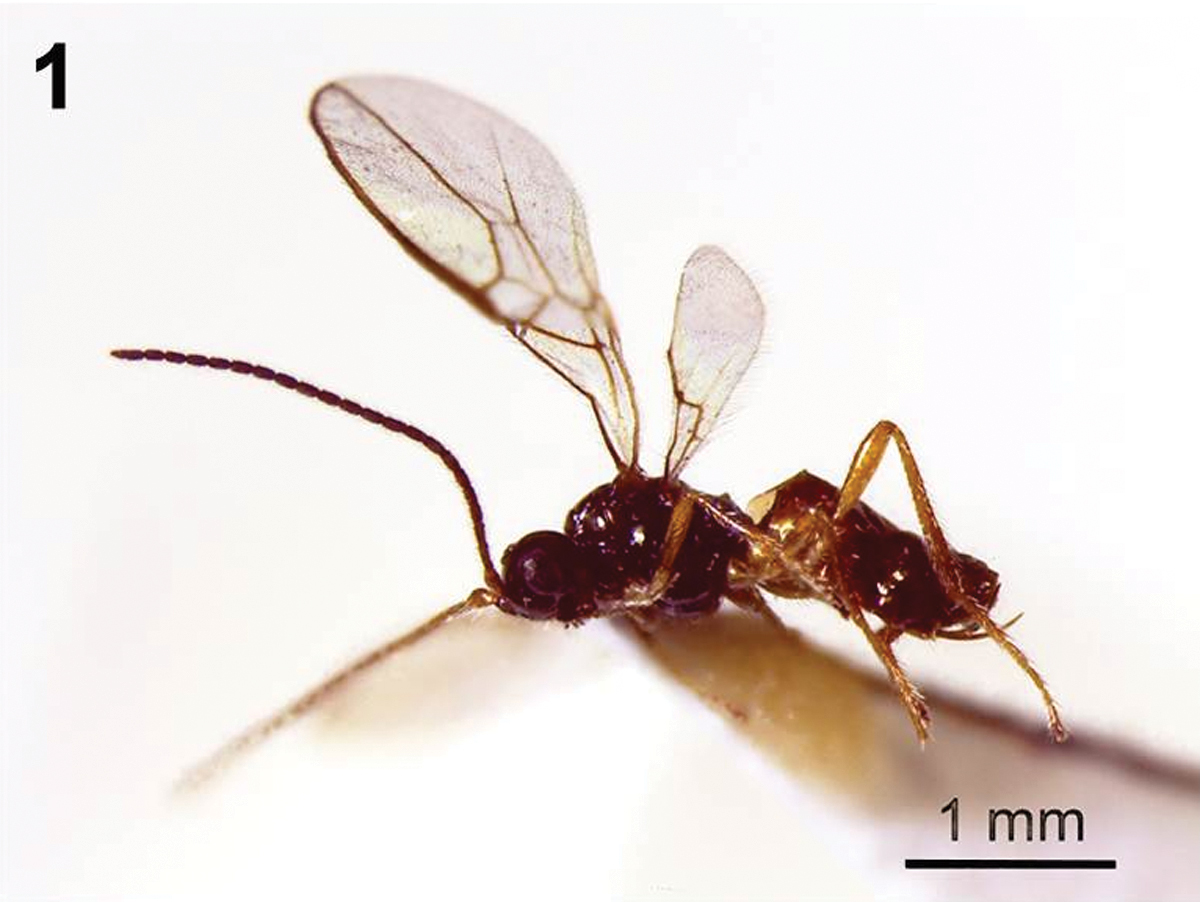
- Dinotrema alysiae female

Scientific classification
- Kingdom: Animalia
- Phylum: Arthropoda
- Class: Insecta
- Order: Hymenoptera
- Family: Braconidae
- Subfamily: Alysiinae
- Tribe: Alysiini
- Genus: Dinotrema; Foerster, 1862

= Dinotrema =

Genus of wasps

Dinotrema is a genus of wasps in the family Braconidae. Species are amongst the largest parasitoid wasps in the tribe Alysiini (Alysiinae). There are approximately 350 species described around worldwide.

== Economic significance ==
Generally, Dinotrema species are parasitoids of the larvae of Diptera predominantly from families Anthomyiidae, Phoridae and Platypezidae, groups considered as pests.

== Distribution ==
Dinotrema comprises a large number of species described from Afrotropical, Australasian, Nearctic, Neotropical, Oceanic, Oriental and Palaearctic (mainly from Western Europe) regions.

== Identification ==
This genus has tridentate and small mandibles, with paraclypeal fovea short, not reaching ventral edge of eyes. Vein cuqu1 (2-SR) present and sclerotized and nervulus (cu-a) postfurcal. It is differentiated from the genus Aspilota by the short size of the paraclypeal fovea far separated from the inner margin of the eye. Moreover, this genus can be differentiated from the genus Synaldis Foerster, 1862 by the presence of the vein cuqu1 (2-SR) and Adelphenaldis Fischer, 2003 by the short size of the paraclypeal fovea and the presence of the vein cuqu1 (2-SR).
