= Chorebus lateralis =

Scientific classification
- Kingdom: Animalia
- Phylum: Arthropoda
- Class: Insecta
- Order: Hymenoptera
- Family: Braconidae
- Genus: Chorebus
- Species: C. lateralis

Binomial name
- Chorebus lateralis Haliday 1839

Species of wasp

Chorebus lateralis is a species of diurnal parasitoid wasp.
