= Kaurimyia =

Conservation status
- Naturally Uncommon (NZ TCS)

Scientific classification
- Kingdom: Animalia
- Phylum: Arthropoda
- Class: Insecta
- Order: Diptera
- Family: Apsilocephalidae
- Genus: Kaurimyia; Winterton & Irwin, 2008
- Species: K. thorpei

Binomial name
- Kaurimyia thorpei Winterton & Irwin, 2008

Species of caddisfly

Kaurimyia is a monotypic genus of fly belonging to the family Apsilocephalidae. The sole species found in this genus is Kaurimyia thorpei. Both the genus and species were first described by Shaun L. Winterton and Michael Edward Irwin in 2008. Kaurimyia thorpei is endemic to New Zealand.

== Taxonomy ==
The genus and species were both identified by Shaun L. Winterton and Michael Edward Irwin in 2008, based on a holotype collected by Stephen E. Thorpe from Te Piringa / Cascade Kauri in the Waitākere Ranges west of Auckland, New Zealand. Winterton and Irwin named the genus after kauri forests, where the type species K. thorpei was found, and decided to name the species epithet after Thorpe.

== Description ==
The species has a dark coloured body, with frons wider than its ocellar tubercle, something seen in both males and females.

== Distribution and habitat ==
The species is endemic to New Zealand. Only two specimens have been found: one in the Waitākere Ranges of the Auckland Region on the North Island, and the other near Dunedin in the Otago Region of the South Island.
