= Aphaereta =

Scientific classification
- Kingdom: Animalia
- Phylum: Arthropoda
- Class: Insecta
- Order: Hymenoptera
- Family: Braconidae
- Subfamily: Alysiinae
- Tribe: Alysiini
- Genus: Aphaereta; Förster, 1862

Synonyms
- Aphaerete Dalla Torre, 1898

Genus of wasps

Aphaereta is a genus of wasp in the family Braconidae. There are more than 40 described species in Aphaereta.

== Species ==
These 41 species belong to the genus Aphaereta:

- Aphaereta alkonost Belokobylskij, 1998
- Aphaereta aotea Hughes & Woolcock, 1976
- Aphaereta apicalis Ashmead, 1895
- Aphaereta basirufa Granger, 1949
- Aphaereta brevis Tobias, 1962
- Aphaereta ceratitivora van Achterberg, Oliveiraan Achterberg, Teixeira & Oliveira, 2012
- Aphaereta colei Marsh, 1969
- Aphaereta confusa Wharton, 1994
- Aphaereta difficilis Nixon, 1939 (Europe)
- Aphaereta dipterica Fischer, 1966
- Aphaereta elegans Tobias, 1962
- Aphaereta elongata Peris-Felipo, 2015
- Aphaereta excavata McComb, 1960
- Aphaereta falcigera Graham, 1960
- Aphaereta flavidens (Ratzeburg, 1844)
- Aphaereta genevensis Fischer, 1966
- Aphaereta hararensis Peris-Felipo, 2015
- Aphaereta ithacensis Fischer, 1966
- Aphaereta kroshka Belokobylskij, 1998
- Aphaereta laeviuscula (Spinola, 1851)
- Aphaereta lonchaeae Wharton, 1977
- Aphaereta major (Thomson, 1895) (Europe)
- Aphaereta marshi Wharton, 1977
- Aphaereta masoni McComb, 1960
- Aphaereta megalops Wharton, 1977
- Aphaereta melanura Schrottky, 1902
- Aphaereta minuta (Nees, 1811) (Europe)
- Aphaereta mosselensis Peris-Felipo, 2015
- Aphaereta muesebecki Marsh, 1969
- Aphaereta palea (Papp, 1990)
- Aphaereta pallidinotum Wharton, 2002
- Aphaereta pallipes (Say, 1829) (Parasitoid wasp)
- Aphaereta rubicunda Tobias, 1962
- Aphaereta sarcophagensis Shenefelt, 1974
- Aphaereta scaptomyzae Fischer, 1966
- Aphaereta subtropicalis Wharton, 1977
- Aphaereta sylvia Belokobylskij, 1998
- Aphaereta tenuicornis Nixon, 1939
- Aphaereta tricolor Papp, 1994
- Aphaereta varipedis Fischer, 1966
- Aphaereta vondelparkensis Achterberg, Schilthuizen, Meer, Delval, Dias, Hoynck, Köster, Maarschall, Peeters, Venema, Zaremba & Be
