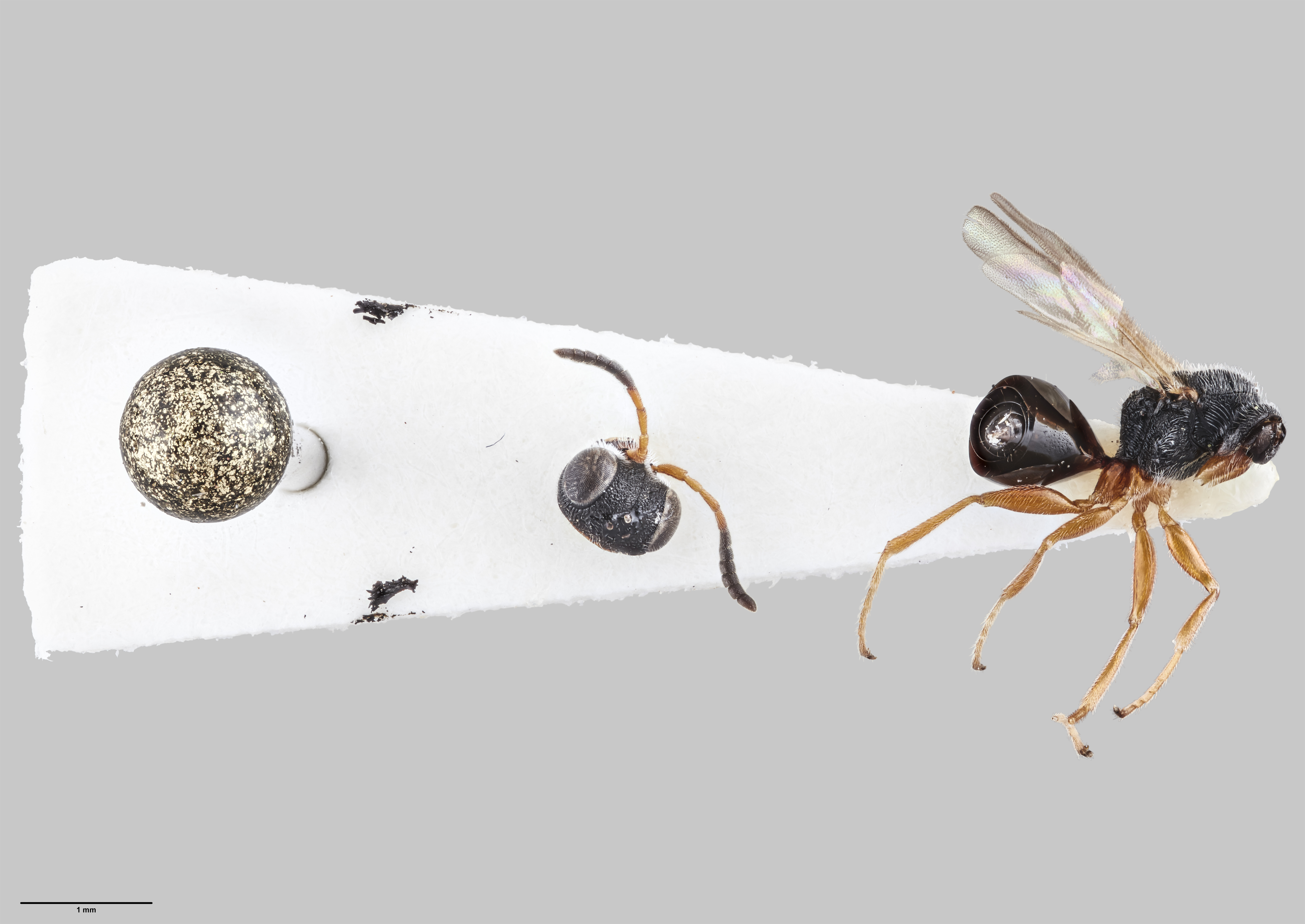
- Bocchus thorpei

Scientific classification
- Kingdom: Animalia
- Phylum: Arthropoda
- Class: Insecta
- Order: Hymenoptera
- Family: Dryinidae
- Subfamily: Bocchinae
- Genus: Bocchus; Ashmead, 1893

Species
- See text

Synonyms
- Anteonella Dodd, 1913; Eukoebeleia R.Perkins, 1905; Hymenodryinus Benoit, 1953; Neoanteon Fouts, 1922; Phorbas Ashmead, 1893; Phorbasia Kieffer, 1913; Tetradryinus Kieffer, 1913

= Bocchus (wasp) =

Genus of wasp

Bocchus is a genus of wasps belonging to the family Dryinidae. The genus was described by American entomologist William Harris Ashmead in 1892.

== Taxonomy ==
Ashmead described the genus in 1893. It was originally a monotypic genus, with the only member (the current type species) being B. flavicollis.

== Description ==
Ashmead's original text (the type description) reads as follows:

Head large, broad, shaped much as in Dryinus, but the vertex not impressed, the occiput very slightly concave; eyes large oval, prominent; ocelli small, close together in a triangle. Antennae 10-jointed, subfiliform, very slightly thickened toward tips, inserted Just above the clypeus, the scape longer than the first flagellar joint.

Maxillary palpi 4-jointed.

Mandibles 3-dentate, nearly equal, the inner tooth a little the smallest.

Thorax not much lengthened, much narrowed anteriorly and truncate posteriorly, the angles of the truncature rounded; the pronotum is almost as long as the mesonotum but much narrower, a little wider anteriorly than at base, only about half the width of the very broad head; mesonotum wider than long, with furrows; scutellum semicircular with a transverse furrow all across the base; metathorax much shorter than high, abruptly truncate.

Front wings with a lanceolate stigma, two basal cells, and an open marginal cell, the radius being long and curved.

Abdomen globose, distinctly petiolate, the petiole blender, cylindrical, as long as the hind coxae.

Legs as in Dryinus, the anterior tarsi chelate, the fourth Joint not much larger than the third.

== Distribution ==
The genus has a cosmopolitan distribution.

== Species ==
- Bocchus adebratti Olmi, 1993
- Bocchus asper Olmi, 1987
- Bocchus banianus Olmi, 1993
- Bocchus beckeri Olmi, 1991
- Bocchus bini Olmi, 1984
- Bocchus brooksi Olmi, 2003
- Bocchus confusus Olmi & van Harten, 2006
- Bocchus europaeus (Bernard, 1939)
- Bocchus flavicollis Ashmead, 1893
- Bocchus forestalis Olmi, Copeland & Noort, 2019
- Bocchus fynbosensis Olmi, 2006
- Bocchus granulatus Olmi, Copeland & Noort, 2019
- Bocchus haladai Olmi, 2008
- Bocchus harinhalai Olmi, Copeland & Noort, 2019
- Bocchus hova Olmi, 2004
- Bocchus hyalinus Olmi, 1998
- Bocchus incompletus Olmi, 2005
- Bocchus indicus Olmi, 1987
- Bocchus irwini Olmi & Guglielmino, 2013
- Bocchus italicus Olmi, 1984
- Bocchus johanssoni Olmi, Copeland & Guglielmino, 2015
- Bocchus kibalensis Olmi, van Noort & Guglielmino, 2016
- Bocchus kirkspriggsi Olmi, 2005
- Bocchus kogelbergensis Olmi, 2007
- Bocchus krombeini Olmi.B, 1991
- Bocchus laotianus Olmi, 1984
- Bocchus lautereri Olmi, 1998
- Bocchus levis Olmi, 1991
- Bocchus madagascolus Olmi, 1994
- Bocchus martellii Olmi.C, 2002
- Bocchus mkomazianus Olmi, 2005
- Bocchus muluensis Olmi, 1984
- Bocchus niger Olmi.D, 2004
- Bocchus nigroflavus Olmi, Copeland & Noort, 2019
- Bocchus obscurus Olmi, 1994
- Bocchus paglianoi Olmi, 1984
- Bocchus parkeri Olmi, Copeland & Noort, 2019
- Bocchus pedunculatus Nagy, 1969
- Bocchus piceus Olmi, 2008
- Bocchus pratti Guglielmino, Olmi, Capradossi & Speranza, 2020
- Bocchus primaevus Martins & Melo, 2019
- Bocchus rassitus Olmi & van Harten.Scale, 2006
- Bocchus reticulatus Xu, Olmi & He, 2003
- Bocchus rex Olmi, Eggs, Capradossi, van de Kamp, Perkovsky, Guglielmino & Vasilenko, 2022
- Bocchus rubricus (Fouts, 1922)
- Bocchus rubrithorax Olmi, 2005
- Bocchus ruvidus Olmi, Copeland & Noort, 2019
- Bocchus scaramozzinoi Olmi, 1984
- Bocchus schmalhauseni Perkovsky, Olmi, Vasilenko, Capradossi & Guglielmino, 2020
- Bocchus scobiolae Nagy, 1967
- Bocchus seyrigi (Benoit, 1954)
- Bocchus slovacus Strejcek, 1964
- Bocchus thai Olmi, 2005
- Bocchus thorpei Olmi, 2007
- Bocchus turneri Olmi, Copeland & Guglielmino.E, 2011
- Bocchus umber Olmi, 1984
- Bocchus vernieri Olmi, 1995
- Bocchus vetustus Olmi, 1989
- Bocchus viet Olmi, 1991
- Bocchus watshami Olmi, 1987
- Bocchus whiteleyi Olmi, 2007
- Bocchus zimbabwensis Olmi, 1991
