= Chorebus claripennis =

Scientific classification
- Kingdom: Animalia
- Phylum: Arthropoda
- Clade: Pancrustacea
- Class: Insecta
- Order: Hymenoptera
- Family: Braconidae
- Genus: Chorebus
- Species: C. claripennis

Binomial name
- Chorebus claripennis Griffiths, 1984

Species of wasp

Chorebus claripennis is a genus of wasps in the family Braconidae. It was described in a 1984 publication by Griffiths. It can be found in Germany.
