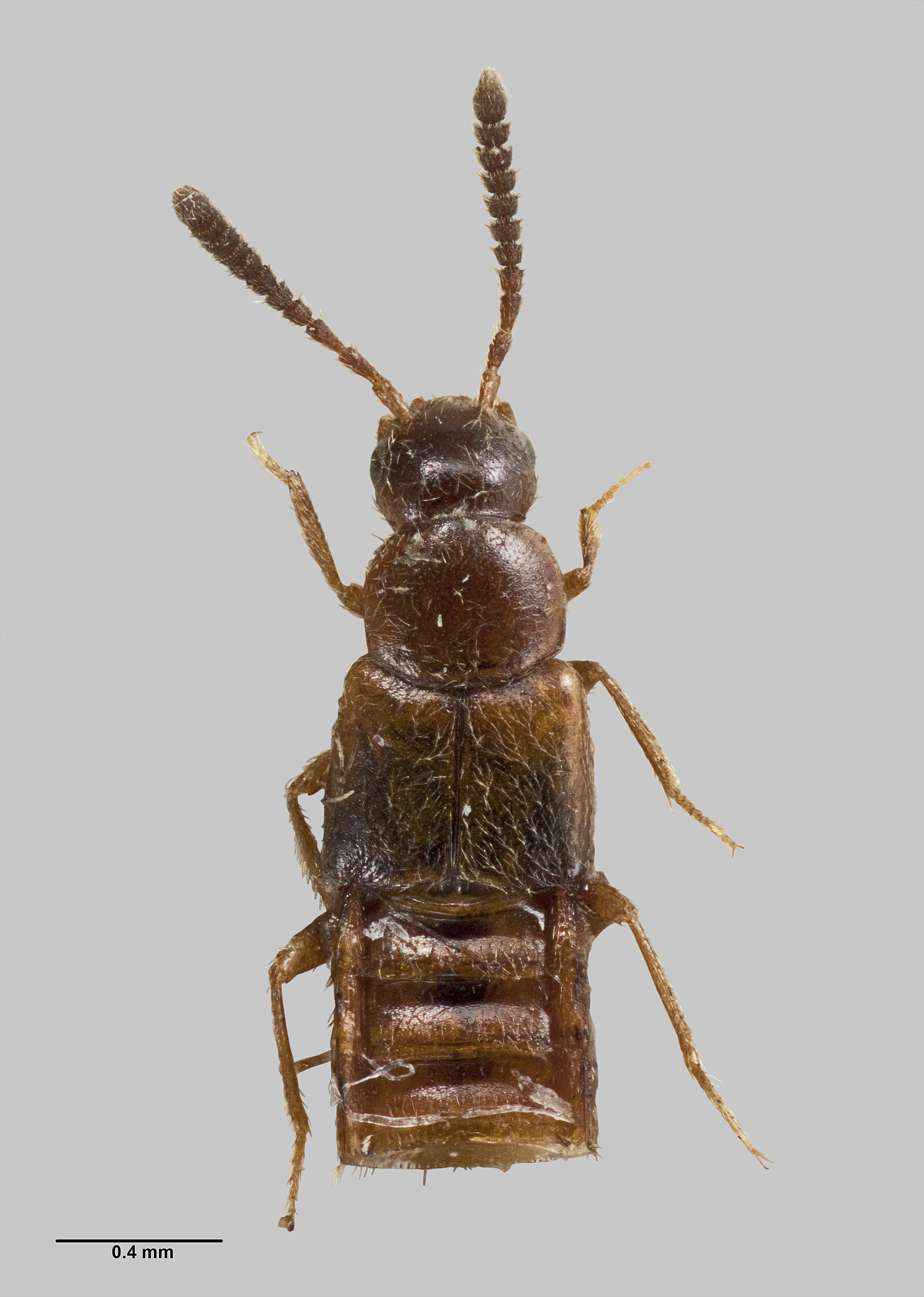
- Neodoxa secreta

Scientific classification
- Domain: Eukaryota
- Kingdom: Animalia
- Phylum: Arthropoda
- Class: Insecta
- Order: Coleoptera
- Suborder: Polyphaga
- Infraorder: Staphyliniformia
- Family: Staphylinidae
- Subfamily: Aleocharinae
- Tribe: Oxypodini
- Subtribe: Oxypodina
- Genus: Neodoxa; Klimaszewski, Marris & Thorpe, 2003

Species
- See text

Synonyms
- Heterodoxa Cameron, 1950

= Neodoxa =

Genus of beetles

Neodoxa is a genus of beetles belonging to the family Staphylinidae. The genus was described by Jan Klimaszewski, John Marris and Stephen Ernest Thorpe in 2003, and is found in New Zealand, Australia and Tonga.

== Taxonomy ==
The genus was first identified by Jan Klimaszewski, John Marris and Stephen Ernest Thorpe in 2003. The type species of the genus is Neodoxa secreta; a species described by Malcolm Cameron in 1950 and originally placed in the genus Heterodoxa. The name is Latin for "new opinion".

The genus was monotypic until 2008, when Roberto Pace identified N. giachinoi at Onepoto Cave in Te Urewera.

== Distribution ==
The genus is found on the North Island of New Zealand, Manawatāwhi / Three Kings Islands, Australia and in Tonga.

== Species ==
- Neodoxa giachinoi Pace, 2008
- Neodoxa laversensis Pace, 2016
- Neodoxa secreta (Cameron, 1950)
- Neodoxa tapuensis Pace, 2015
- Neodoxa tongarirensis Pace, 2015
