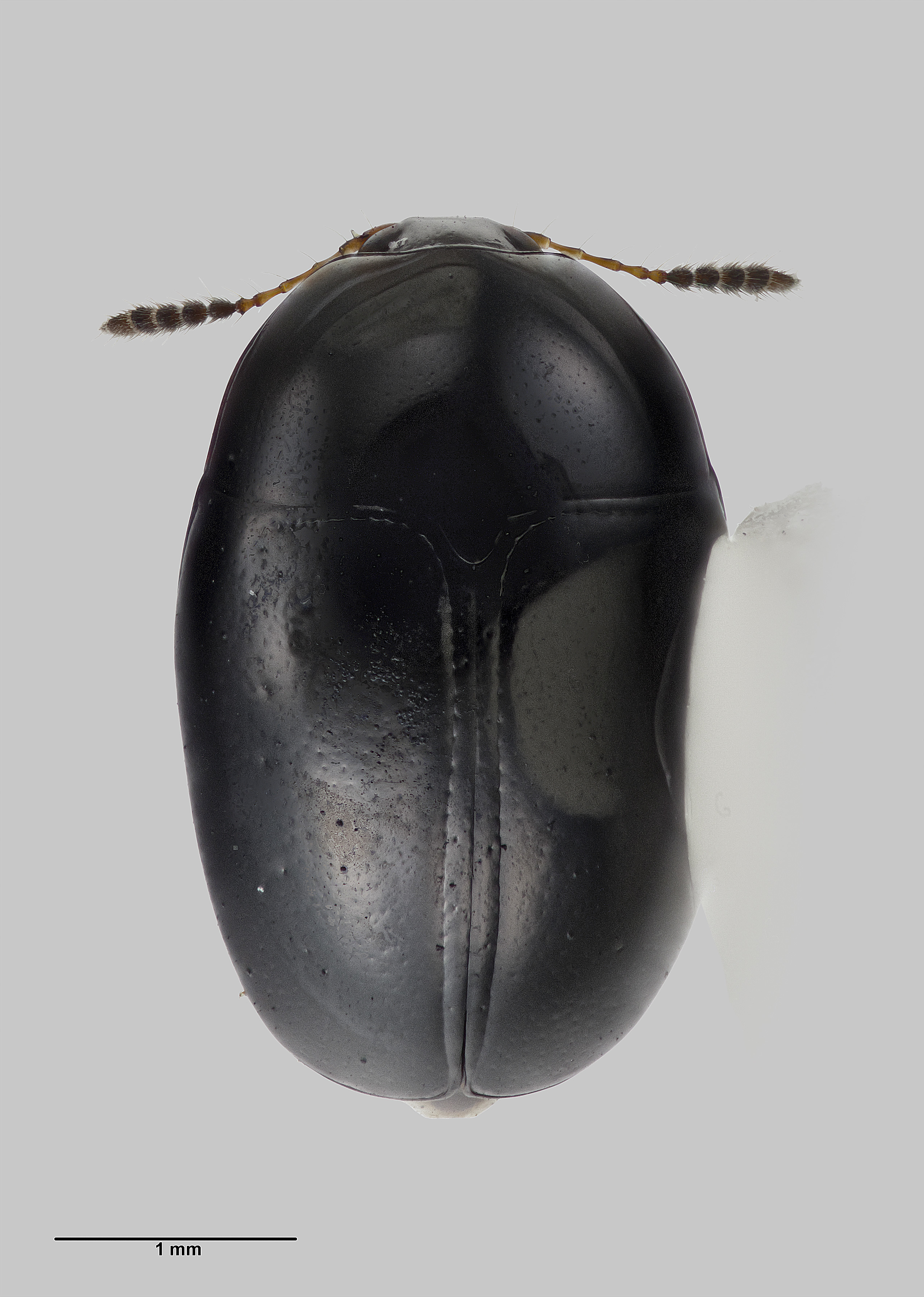
- Holotype specimen from the Auckland War Memorial Museum collections

Conservation status
- Data Deficit (NZ TCS)

Scientific classification
- Kingdom: Animalia
- Phylum: Arthropoda
- Class: Insecta
- Order: Coleoptera
- Suborder: Polyphaga
- Infraorder: Staphyliniformia
- Family: Staphylinidae
- Genus: Cyparium
- Species: C. thorpei

Binomial name
- Cyparium thorpei Löbl & Leschen, 2003

Synonyms
- Cyparium sp. "Mangamuka"

= Cyparium thorpei =

Species of beetle

Cyparium thorpei is a species of rove beetle belonging to the family Staphylinidae. The species was first described by Ivan Löbl and Richard A. B. Leschen in 2003, and is endemic to New Zealand.

== Taxonomy ==
The species was identified by Slovakian entomologist Ivan Löbl and New Zealand entomologist Richard A. B. Leschen in 2003, based on a holotype collected by Stephen E. Thorpe in March 2002 in association with Nothofagus forest, in the vicinity of Whakapapa Village in the central North Island. Löbl and Leschen named the species after Thorpe.

== Description ==
C. thorpei has an elongate body coloured uniformly black or reddish-black, and measures between 3.05–3.15 mm (0.120–0.124 in).

== Distribution and habitat ==
The species is endemic to New Zealand, known to occur in the Northland Region and the central North Island.

== Gallery ==
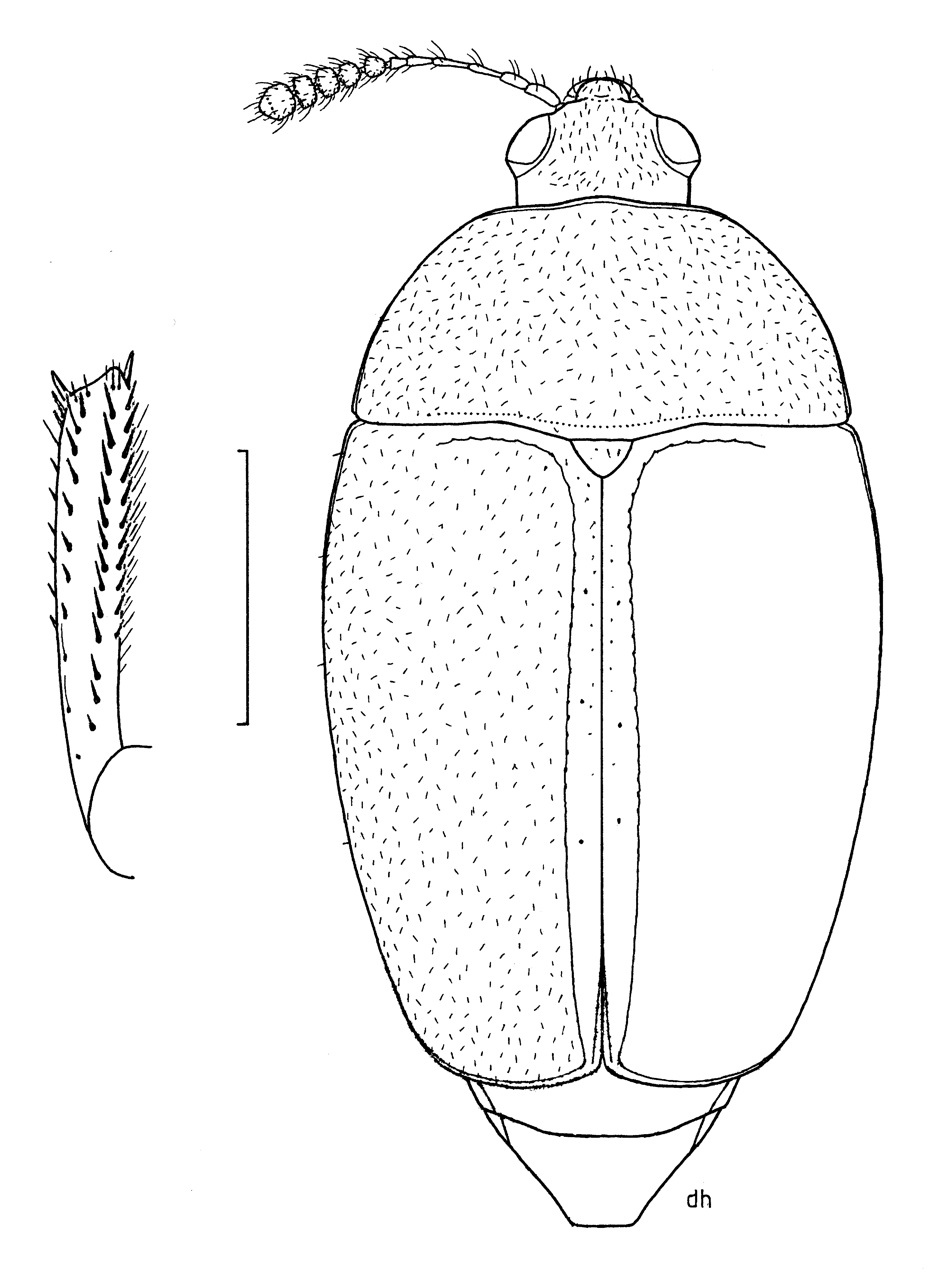
C. thorpei illustration by Des Helmore

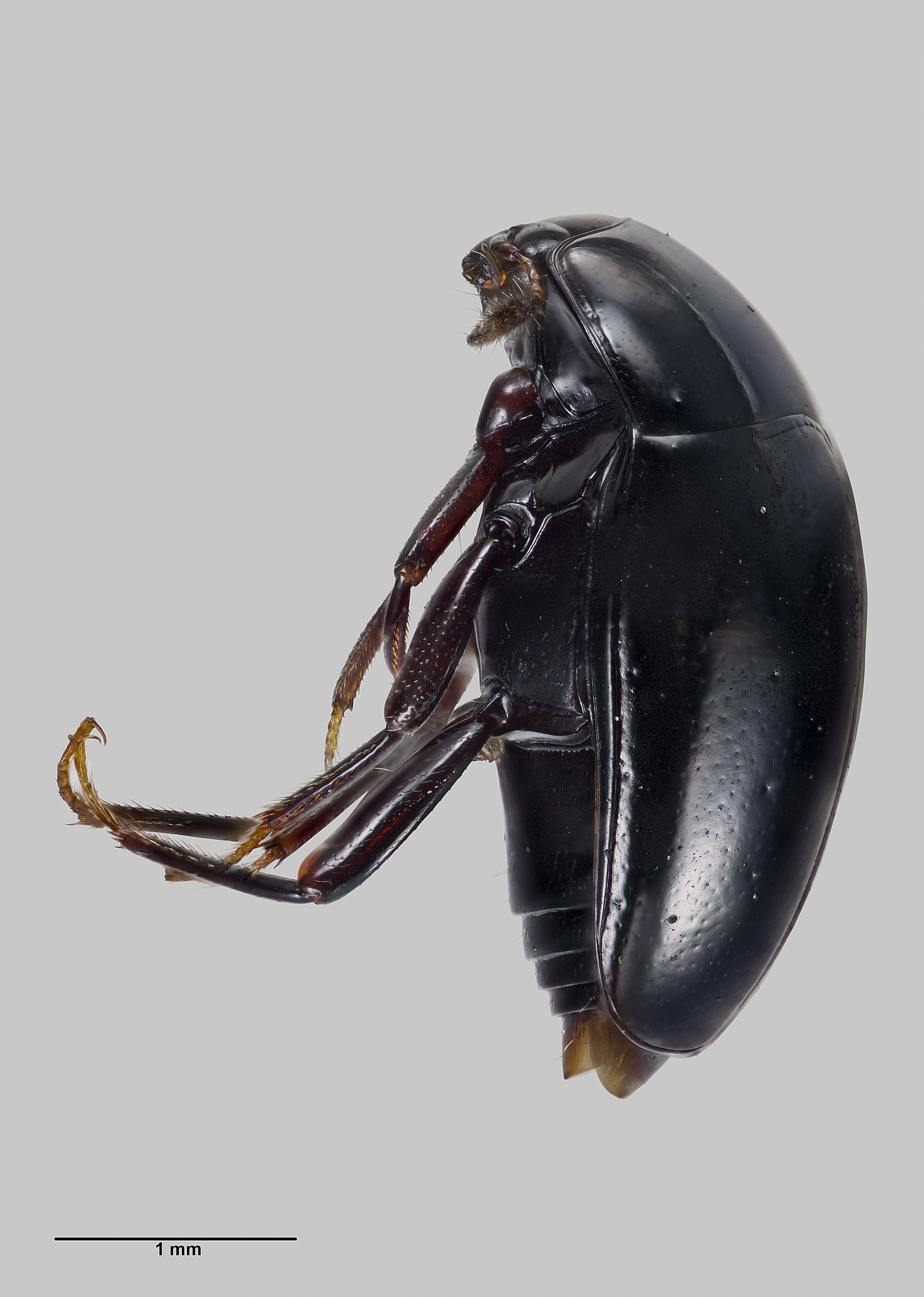
Side view of C. thorpei
