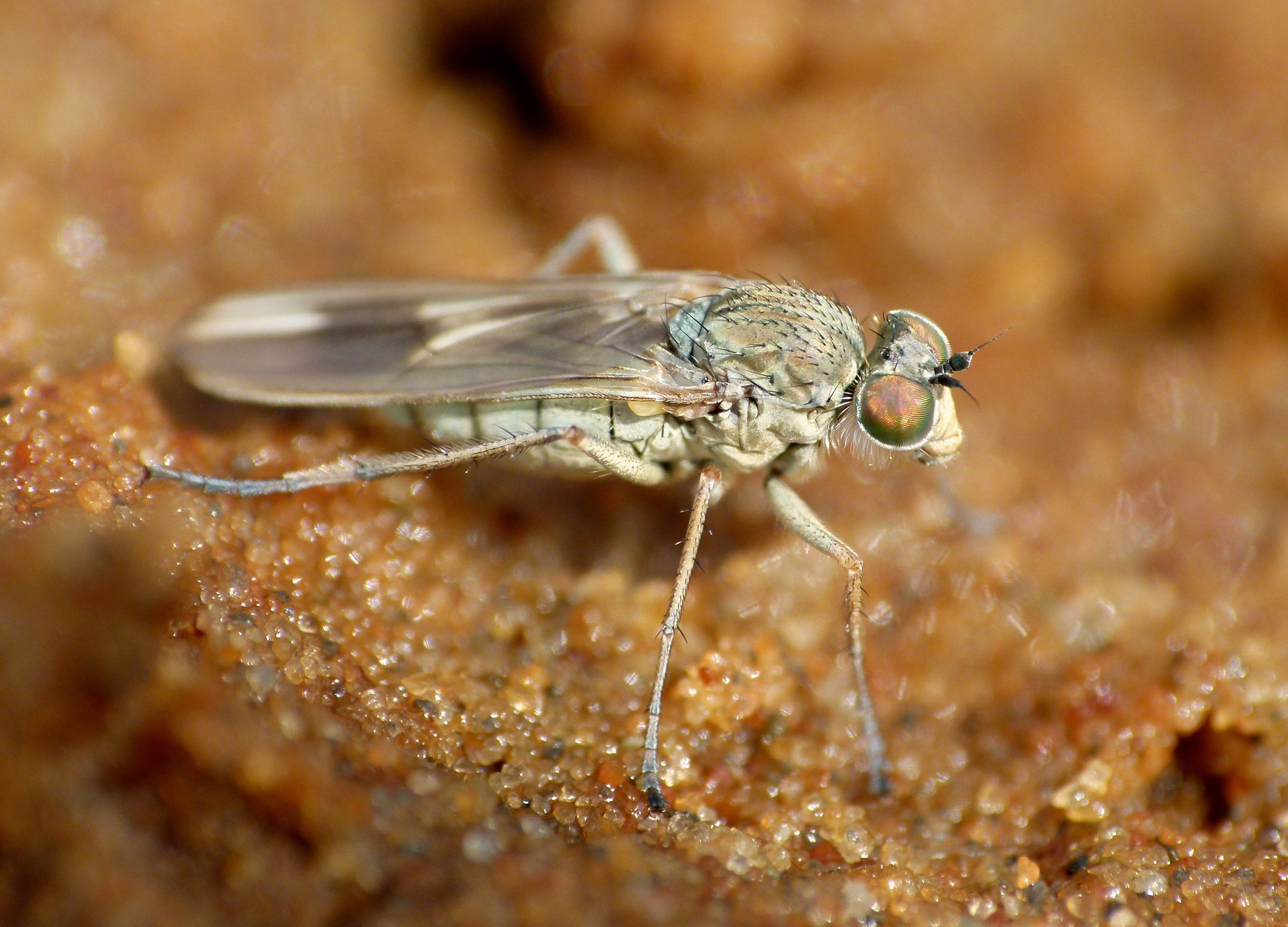
- Female Scorpiurus aramoana photographed in situ on mudflats at Aramoana

Scientific classification
- Kingdom: Animalia
- Phylum: Arthropoda
- Clade: Pancrustacea
- Class: Insecta
- Order: Diptera
- Family: Dolichopodidae
- Subfamily: Hydrophorinae
- Tribe: Hydrophorini
- Genus: Scorpiurus
- Species: S. aramoana

Binomial name
- Scorpiurus aramoana Bickel & Kerr, 2018

= Scorpiurus aramoana =

Species of fly

Scorpiurus aramoana is a species of fly in the family Dolichopodidae. It is endemic to New Zealand. The species was first discovered in December 2017 on the saltmarsh mudflats of Aramoana near Dunedin in the South Island of New Zealand, and later found further south in the Catlins.
