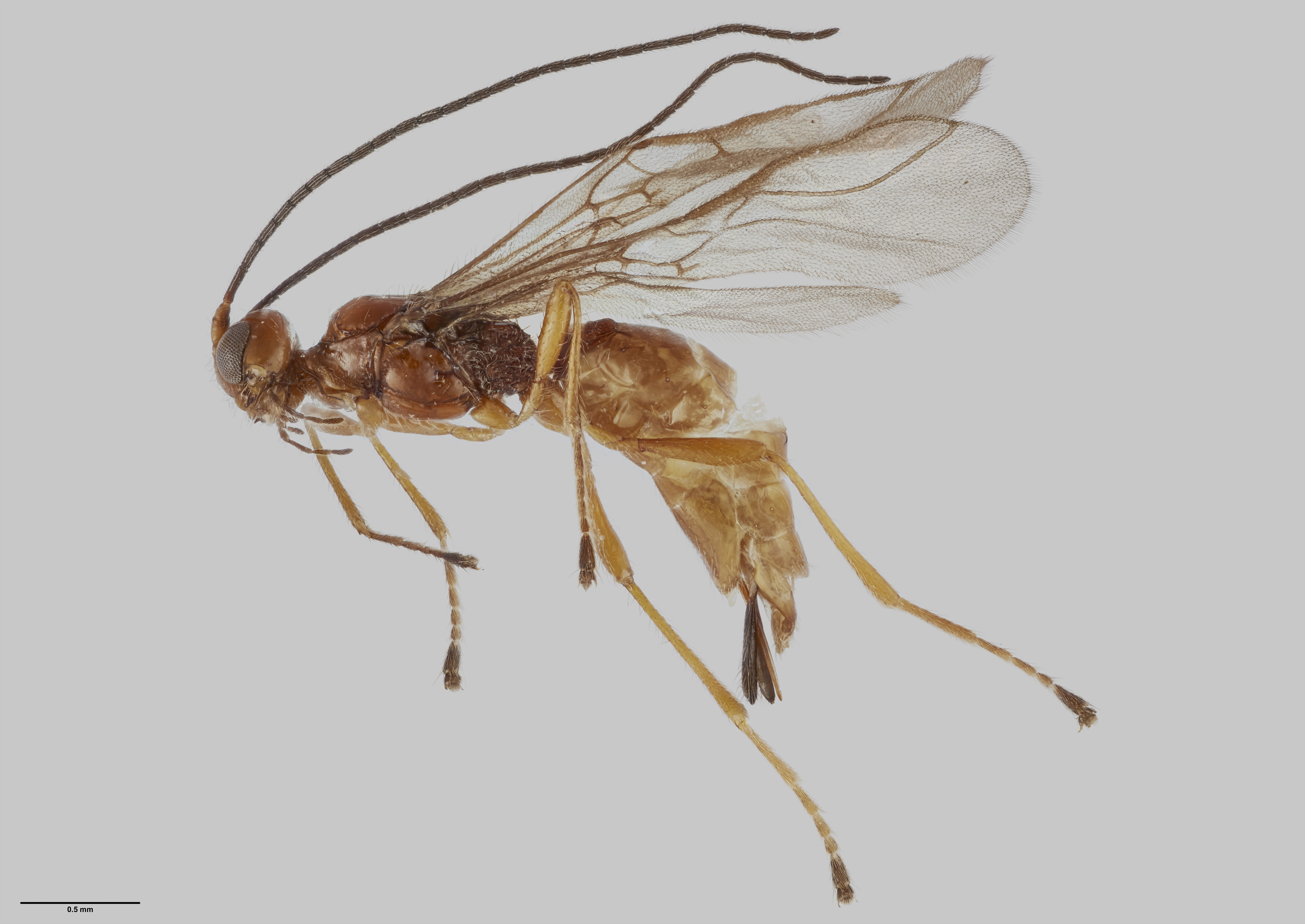
- Female holotype specimen from the collections of Auckland War Memorial Museum

Conservation status
- Data Deficit (NZ TCS)

Scientific classification
- Kingdom: Animalia
- Phylum: Arthropoda
- Clade: Pancrustacea
- Class: Insecta
- Order: Hymenoptera
- Family: Braconidae
- Genus: Chorebus
- Species: C. thorpei

Binomial name
- Chorebus thorpei Berry, 2007

= Chorebus thorpei =

Species of wasp

Chorebus thorpei is a species of parasitoid wasp belonging to the family Braconidae. The species was first described by Jocelyn A. Berry in 2007, and is endemic to New Zealand.

== Taxonomy ==
The species was identified by Jocelyn A. Berry in 2007, based on a holotype collected by Stephen E. Thorpe from Little Windy Hill on Great Barrier Island in the Auckland Region, New Zealand in February 2002. The first known specimen of this species was collected in 1982, but was only recognised as a member of this species in 2007. Berry named the species after Thorpe.

== Description ==
Females of the species have a forewing length of 2.6 mm (0.10 in), while males range between 2.4–2.6 mm (0.094–0.102 in). The species has dark-brown antennae with an orange-brown head. The species can be distinguished from other members of Chorebus due to the presence of two submarginal cells, a fourth tooth on the species' mandible, an unsculptured and linear sternaulus, long antennae, and a predominantly uniform orange-brown colour.

== Distribution and habitat ==
The species is endemic to New Zealand, found on Great Barrier Island and the North Island as far south as the Waikato Region. Adults tend to be collected from between December and February, and the host species of C. thorpei is unknown.
