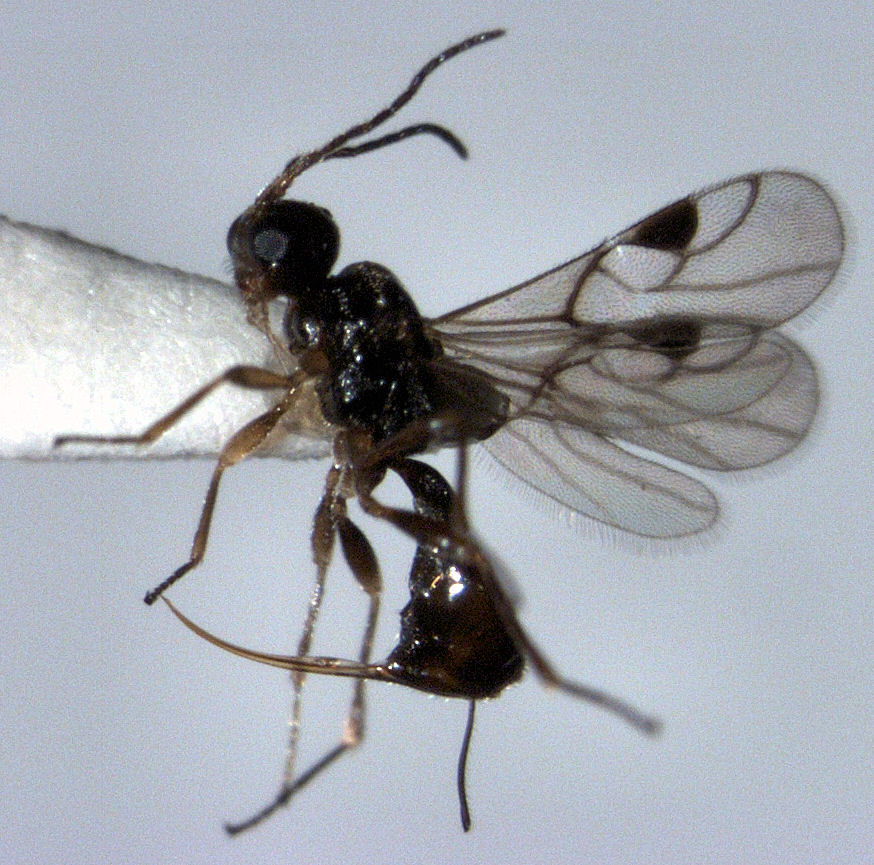
- Cryptoxilos thorpei

Scientific classification
- Domain: Eukaryota
- Kingdom: Animalia
- Phylum: Arthropoda
- Class: Insecta
- Order: Hymenoptera
- Family: Braconidae
- Tribe: Cryptoxilonini
- Genus: Cryptoxilos; Viereck, 1911

Species
- See text

= Cryptoxilos =

Genus of wasp

Cryptoxilos is a genus of parasitoid wasp belonging to the family Braconidae. The genus was described by American entomologist Henry Lorenz Viereck in 1911.

== Taxonomy ==
Viereck chose Cryptoxilos dichromorphus as the type species.

== Distribution ==
The genus likely has a cosmopolitan distribution.

== Species ==
- Cryptoxilos beaveri Shaw & Berry, 2005
- Cryptoxilos convergens Muesebeck, 1936
- Cryptoxilos cracoviensis (Capek & Capecki, 1979)
- Cryptoxilos dichromorphus Viereck, 1911
- Cryptoxilos lymantori Deyrup, 1981
- Cryptoxilos pallipes Chen, He, van Achterberg & Ma, 2001
- Cryptoxilos thorpei Shaw & Berry, 2005
- Cryptoxilos ulleungus Belokobylskij & Ku, 2023
