= Chorebus =

Scientific classification
- Kingdom: Animalia
- Phylum: Arthropoda
- Class: Insecta
- Order: Hymenoptera
- Family: Braconidae
- Subfamily: Alysiinae
- Tribe: Dacnusini
- Genus: Chorebus; Haliday 1833

Genus of wasps

Chorebus is a genus of parasitoid wasps in the family Braconidae. There are around 430 accepted species in the genus.

The genus was first described in 1833 by Alexander Henry Haliday.

== Selected species ==
- Chorebus axillaris
- Chorebus claripennis
- Chorebus lateralis
- Chorebus longiarticulis
- Chorebus nigridiremptus
- Chorebus paranigricapitis
- Chorebus properesam
- Chorebus rodericki
- Chorebus thorpei
- Chorebus zarghanensis
