= Alloxysta thorpei =

Scientific classification
- Domain: Eukaryota
- Kingdom: Animalia
- Phylum: Arthropoda
- Class: Insecta
- Order: Hymenoptera
- Family: Figitidae
- Genus: Alloxysta
- Species: A. thorpei

Binomial name
- Alloxysta thorpei Ferrer-Suay & Pujade-Villar, 2012

Species of wasp

Alloxysta thorpei is a species of parasitoid wasp belonging to the family Figitidae. The species was first described by Mar Ferrer-Suay and Juli Pujade-Villar in 2012, and is found in Australia and New Zealand.

== Taxonomy ==
The species was identified by Mar Ferrer-Suay and Juli Pujade-Villar in 2012, based on a holotype collected by J.S. Noyes in October 1980 from the Omahuta Forest Park kauri sanctuary in the Northland Region, later recognised by Stephen E. Thorpe as a distinct species. Ferrer-Suay and Pujade-Villar named the species after Thorpe. Originally thought to be endemic to New Zealand, the species was later identified in Queensland, Australia in 2014, and is suspected to be an adventive species that originated from Australia.

== Description ==
A. thorpei measured between 0.8–1.2 mm (0.031–0.047 in) in length. It is yellowish brown in colour. It can be differentiated from A. rubidus and A. darci due to proportions of flagellomeres, and the shape of pronotal carinae.

== Distribution and habitat ==
The species is found in Australia and New Zealand. In Australia the species has been found in Queensland, and in New Zealand it has been found on the North Island and the South Island as far south as Christchurch. The species is typically found in association with Nothofagus forests, however the host species for this insect is not known.
