= Alloea (wasp) =

Scientific classification
- Kingdom: Animalia
- Phylum: Arthropoda
- Class: Insecta
- Order: Hymenoptera
- Family: Braconidae
- Subfamily: Alysiinae
- Genus: Alloea; Haliday, 1833

Genus of wasps

Alloea is a genus of parasitoid wasp in the family Braconidae.

== Species ==
- Alloea ampla Wharton & Chou, 1985
- Alloea artus Chen & Wu, 1994
- Alloea bonessi Fischer, 1966
- Alloea contracta Haliday, 1833
- Alloea eleophila Wharton, 1980
- Alloea kostroma Belokobylskij, 1998
- Alloea kupala Belokobylskij, 1998
- Alloea lineata Wharton & Chou, 1985
- Alloea lonchopterae Fischer, 1966
- Alloea mesostenos Chen & Wu, 1994
- Alloea sadko Belokobylskij, 1998
- Alloea sparsa Wharton & Chou, 1985
- Alloea striata Wharton & Chou, 1985
- Alloea veles Belokobylskij, 1997
