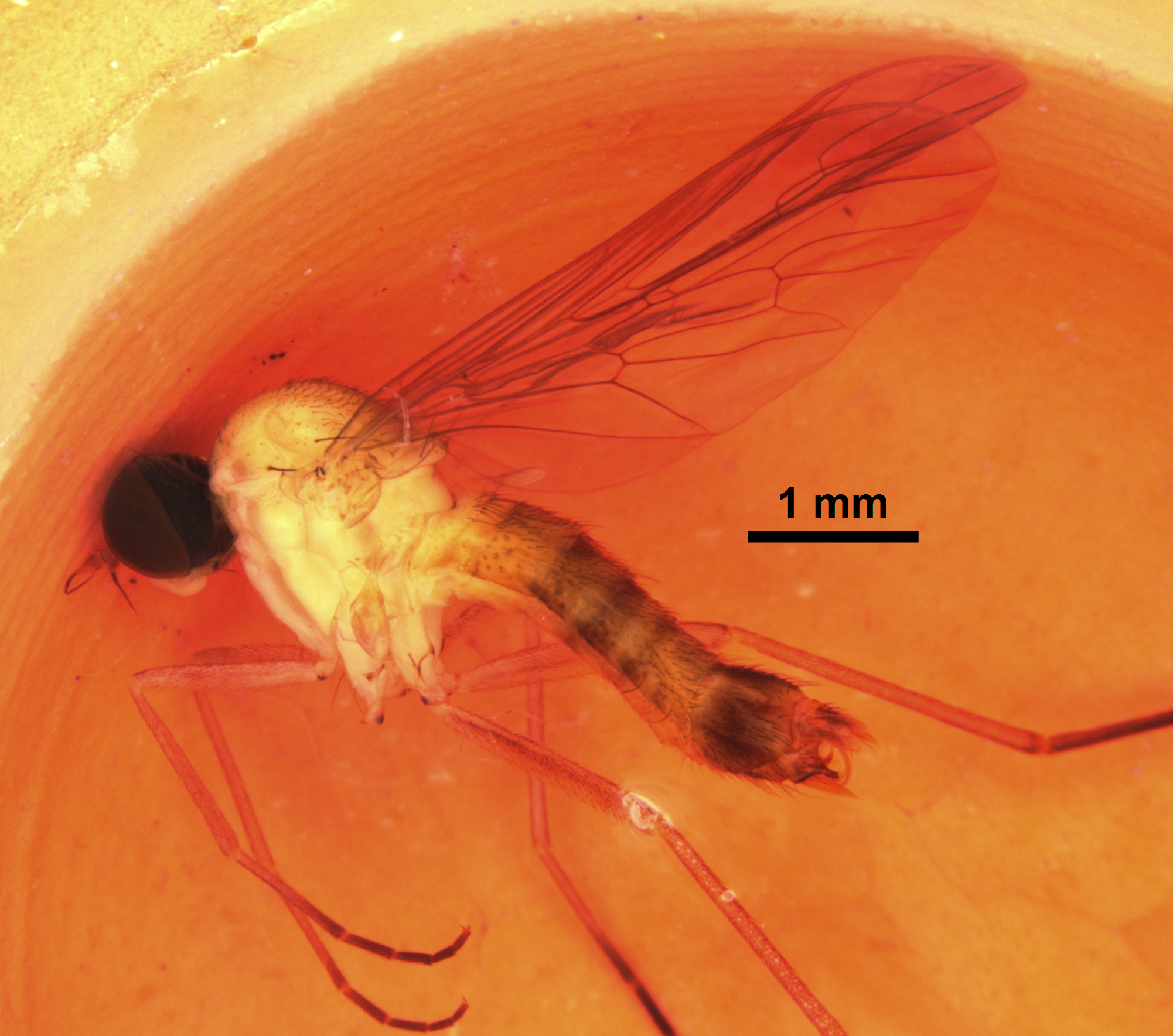
- male specimen of Apsilocephala, from Nevada, USA
- Apsilocephalidae wing venation

Scientific classification
- Domain: Eukaryota
- Kingdom: Animalia
- Phylum: Arthropoda
- Class: Insecta
- Order: Diptera
- Superfamily: Asiloidea
- Family: Apsilocephalidae; Nagatomi et al., 1991

Genera
- see text

= Apsilocephalidae =

Apsilocephalidae Temporal range: Cenomanian–Recent

Family of flies

Apsilocephalidae is a family of flies in the superfamily Asiloidea. It was historically treated as a subfamily within Therevidae, but placed in a separate family in 1991, and subsequently recognized as more distantly related. The family contains three extant genera and at least five extinct genera described from the fossil record.

== Genera ==
These six genera belong to the family Apsilocephalidae:

- Apsilocephala Kröber, 1914
- †Burmapsilocephala Gaimari & Mostovski, 2000 (Cenomanian, Burmese amber)
- Clesthentia White, 1915
- Clesthentiella Nagatomi, Saigusa, Nagatomi & Lyneborg, 1991
- †Irwinimyia Zhang et al., 2018 (Cenomanian, Burmese amber)
- †Kaurimyia Winterton & Irwin, 2008
- †Kumaromyia Grimaldi & Hauser, 2011
- †Myanmarpsilocephala Zhang et al., 2018 (Cenomanian, Burmese amber)

The Burmese amber genus Kuhwahldyia described in 2019 is suggested to be a relative of the family.

- Therevoid clade
  - Apsilocephalidae
  - - Evocoidae
    - - Scenopinidae
      - Therevidae
