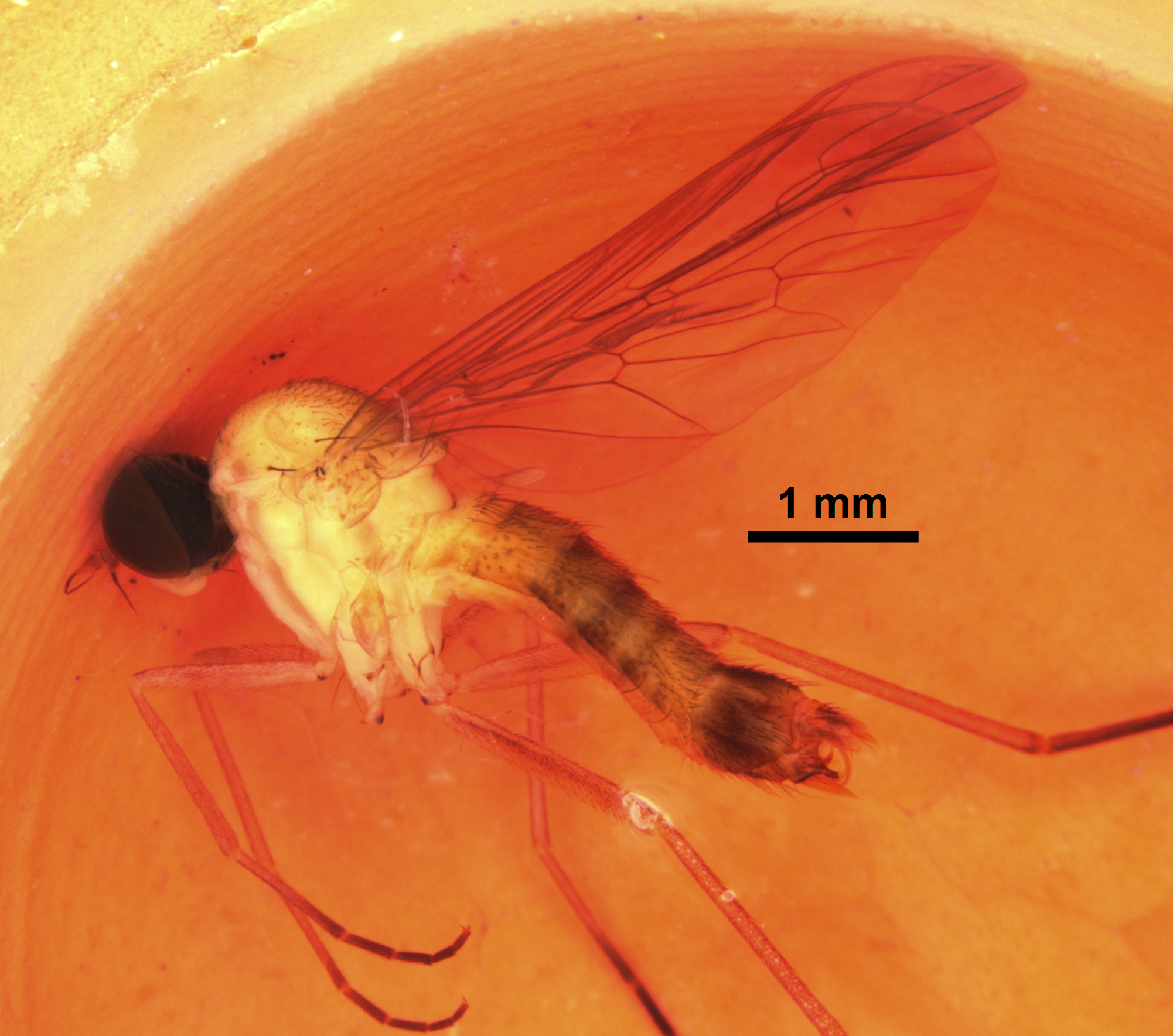
- male specimen of Apsilocephala, from Nevada, USA

Scientific classification
- Domain: Eukaryota
- Kingdom: Animalia
- Phylum: Arthropoda
- Class: Insecta
- Order: Diptera
- Family: Apsilocephalidae
- Genus: Apsilocephala; Kröber, 1914

= Apsilocephala =

Genus of flies

Apsilocephala is a genus of flies in the family Apsilocephalidae. There is only one extant described species in Apsilocephala, but there are also two fossil species.

== Species ==
- Apsilocephala longistyla Krober, 1914
- †Apsilocephala pusilla (Hennig, 1967)
- †Apsilocephala vagabunda (Cockerell, 1927)
