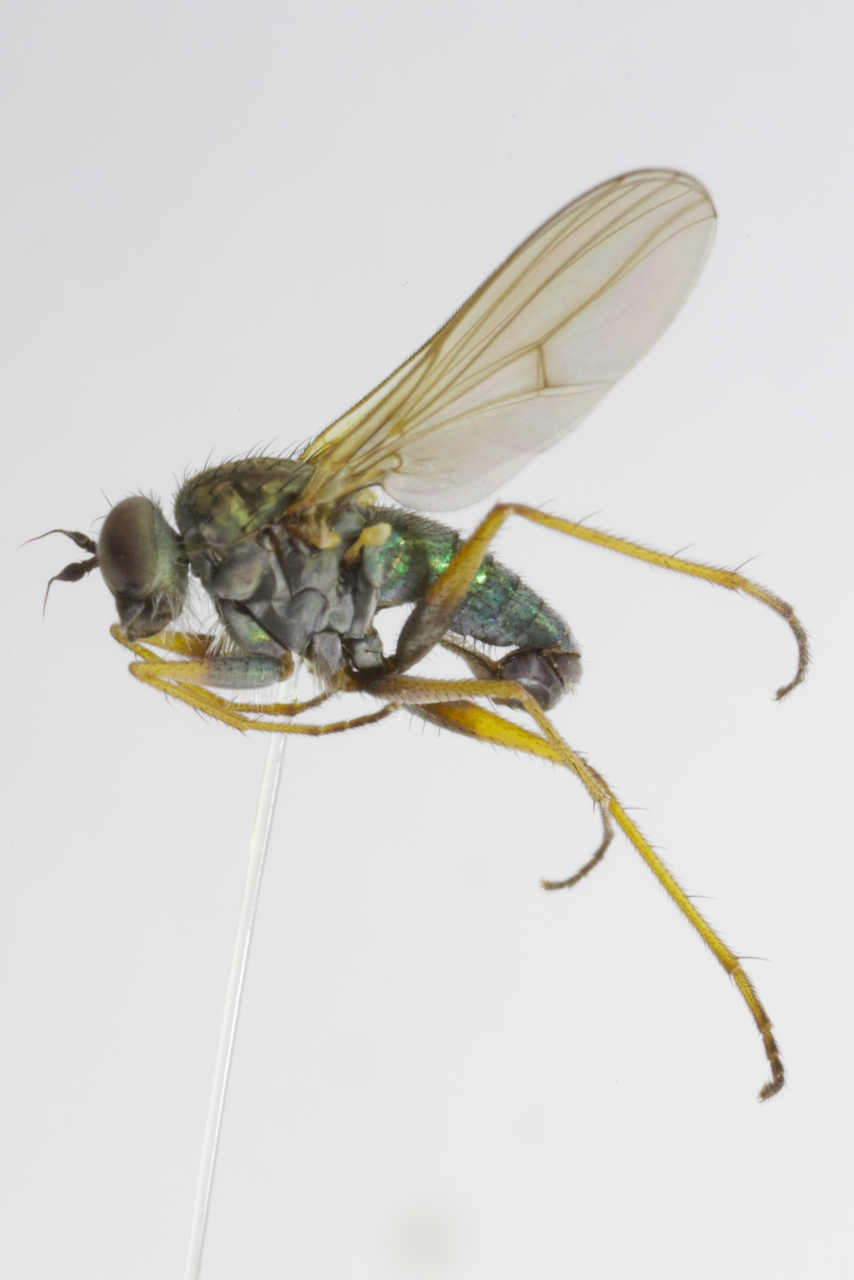

Scientific classification
- Kingdom: Animalia
- Phylum: Arthropoda
- Class: Insecta
- Order: Diptera
- Family: Dolichopodidae
- Genus: Scorpiurus
- Species: S. thorpei

Binomial name
- Scorpiurus thorpei Masunaga, 2017

= Scorpiurus thorpei =

Species of fly

Scorpiurus thorpei is a species of fly belonging to the family Dolichopodidae. First described by Kazuhiro Masunaga in 2017, it is endemic to New Zealand.

== Taxonomy ==
The species was identified by Japanese entomologist Kazuhiro Masunaga in 2017, based on a holotype he collected 3 km (1.9 mi) west of Linkwater in the Marlborough District in 2007. Masunaga named the species after entomologist Stephen E. Thorpe, who collected many paratypes of the species and assisted in the collection process.

== Description ==
Males of S. thorpei have a body length ranging between 3.2–4.1 mm (0.13–0.16 in), and a wing length of between 3.9–4.1 mm (0.15–0.16 in), while females' body lengths range between 3.1–4.5 mm (0.12–0.18 in), and have wing lengths of between 3.6–4.5 mm (0.14–0.18 in). The species is morphologically similar to S. aenescens, but differs as S. thorpei has pale brown legs and relatively straight posterior adbominal segments, meaning the species does not have a scorpion-like appearance.

== Distribution ==
The species is endemic to New Zealand, found on both the North Island and the northern South Island.
