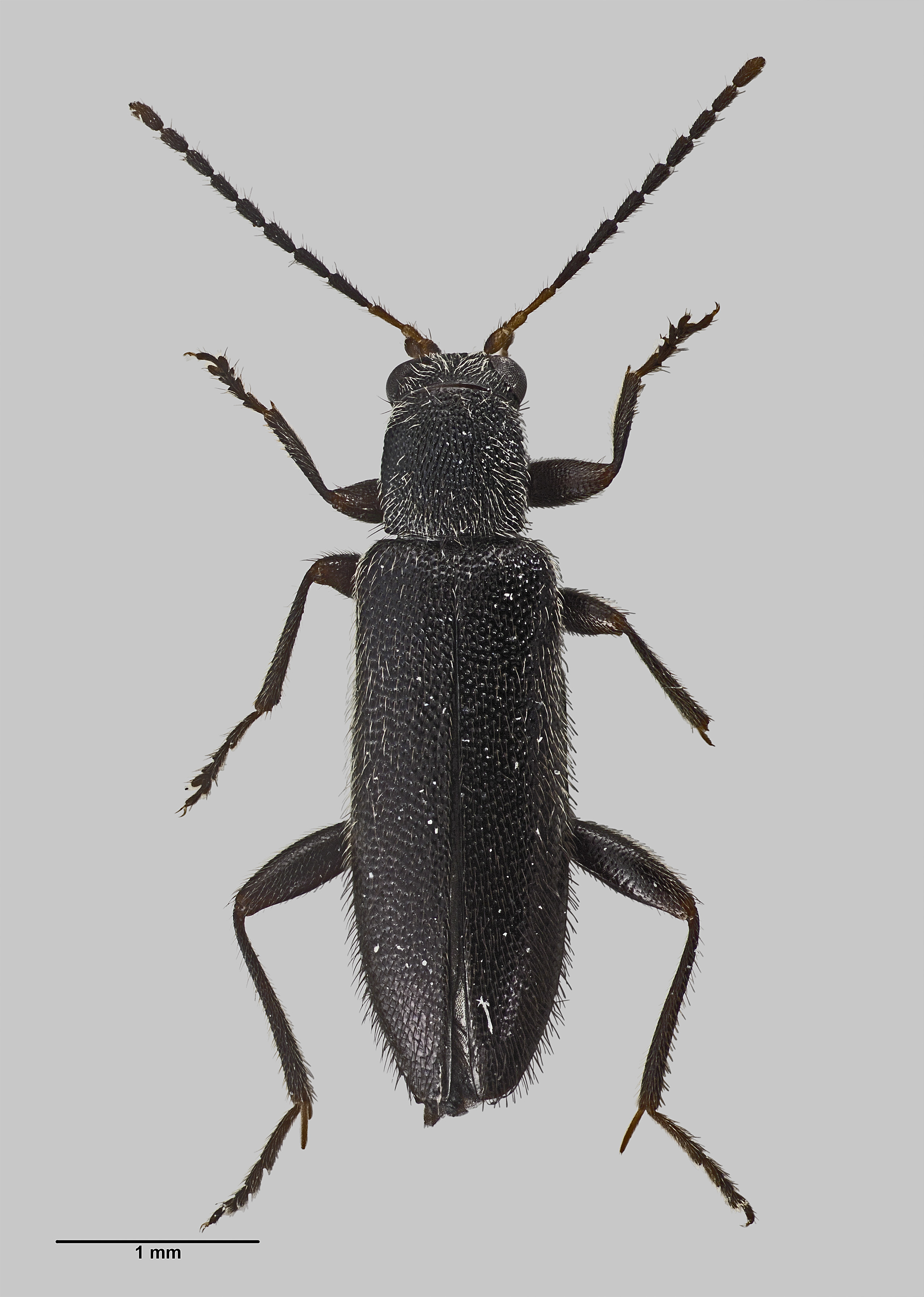
- Holotype specimen from the Auckland War Memorial Museum collections

Scientific classification
- Domain: Eukaryota
- Kingdom: Animalia
- Phylum: Arthropoda
- Class: Insecta
- Order: Coleoptera
- Suborder: Polyphaga
- Infraorder: Elateriformia
- Family: Scirtidae
- Genus: Stenocyphon
- Species: S. neozealandicus

Binomial name
- Stenocyphon neozealandicus Ruta, Thorpe & Yoshitomi, 2011

= Stenocyphon neozealandicus =

Species of beetle

Stenocyphon neozealandicus is a species of marsh beetle belonging to the family Scirtidae. The species was first described by Rafał Ruta, Stephen E. Thorpe and Hiroyuki Yoshitomi in 2011, and is endemic to New Zealand.

== Taxonomy ==
The species was identified by Rafał Ruta, Stephen E. Thorpe and Hiroyuki Yoshitomi in 2011. Thorpe identified the species as novel when examining unsorted insect specimens at the Auckland War Memorial Museum in the mid-2000s, however as the specimen was destroyed in the post, no formal description could be made until early 2011, when a second specimen was identified by Thorpe, having been collected from the Warawara Forest in the Far North District by David S. Seldon in 2008. The genus Stenocyphon had previously been monotypic, with one known species occurring in Chile.

== Description ==
S. neozealandicus has a uniformly black dorsum with an elongated body. The head of the species is covered in dense punctures.

== Distribution and habitat ==
The species is endemic to New Zealand, found in the Far North District.
