= Synaldis =

Scientific classification
- Domain: Eukaryota
- Kingdom: Animalia
- Phylum: Arthropoda
- Class: Insecta
- Order: Hymenoptera
- Family: Braconidae
- Genus: Synaldis; Förster, 1862

Genus of insects

Synaldis is a genus of insects belonging to the family Braconidae.

The species of this genus are found in Europe and Northern America.

Species:

- Synaldis acutidens Fischer, 1967
- Synaldis alfalfae Fischer, 1967
