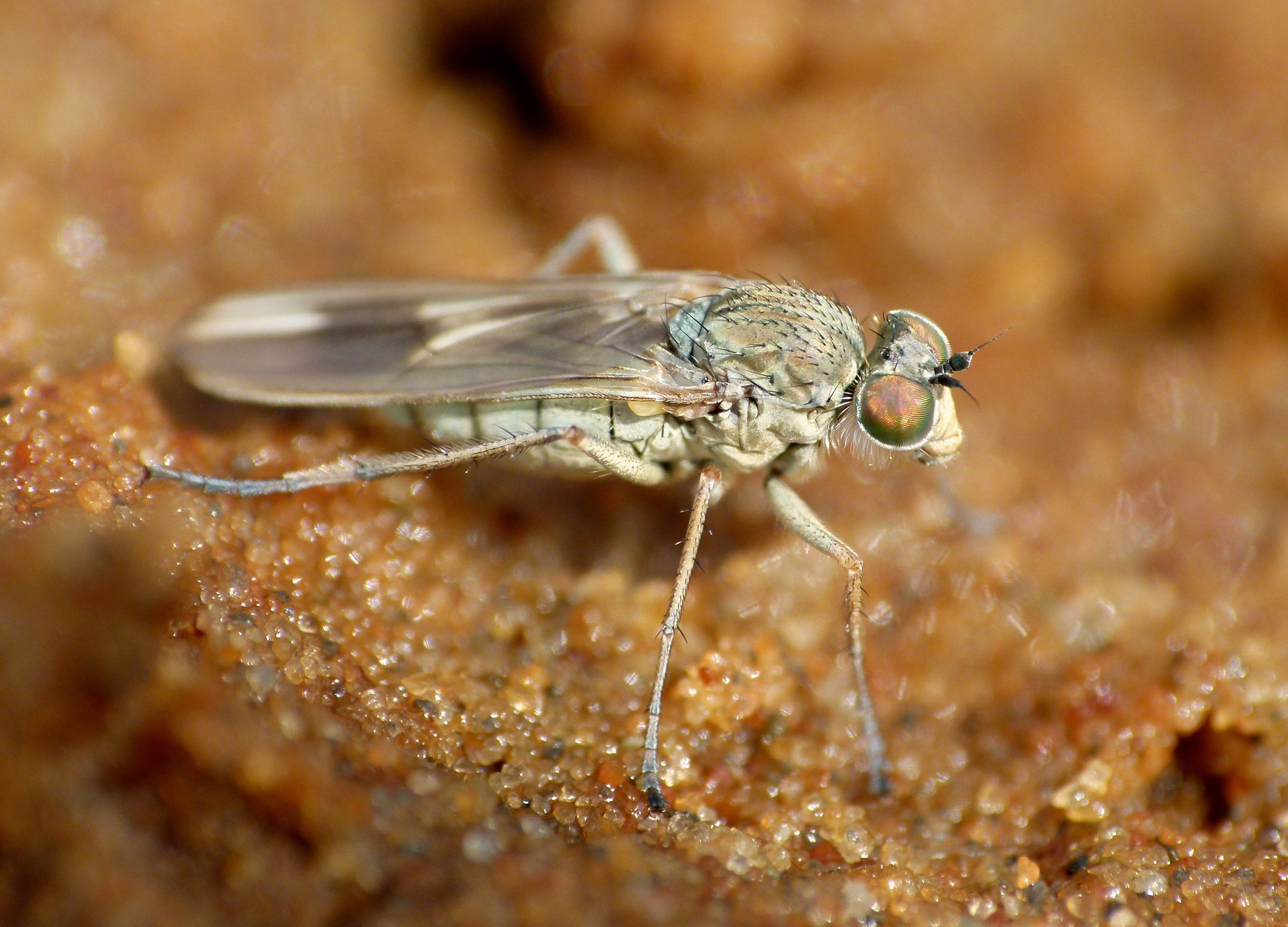
- Female Scorpiurus aramoana photographed in situ on mudflats at Aramoana

Scientific classification
- Kingdom: Animalia
- Phylum: Arthropoda
- Clade: Pancrustacea
- Class: Insecta
- Order: Diptera
- Family: Dolichopodidae
- Subfamily: Hydrophorinae
- Tribe: Hydrophorini
- Genus: Scorpiurus; Parent, 1933

Type species
- Scorpiurus aenescens Parent, 1933

= Scorpiurus (fly) =

Genus of flies

Scorpiurus is a genus of flies in the family Dolichopodidae, endemic to New Zealand. Members of the genus are found in marine littoral habitats.

== Species ==
- Scorpiurus aenescens Parent, 1933 – North Island (Auckland), northern South Island (Marlborough Sounds, Nelson)
- Scorpiurus aramoana Bickel & Kerr, 2018 – South Island (Aramoana, The Catlins)
- Scorpiurus thorpei Masunaga, 2017 – North Island (Auckland), northern South Island (Marlborough Sounds, Nelson)
