= Trachionus =

Scientific classification
- Kingdom: Animalia
- Phylum: Arthropoda
- Class: Insecta
- Order: Hymenoptera
- Family: Braconidae
- Tribe: Dacnusini
- Genus: Trachionus; Haliday, 1833

Genus of wasps

Trachionus is a genus of wasp in the family Braconidae. Larvae are parasitoids of larvae from the genus Phytobia.

There are 17 described species in Trachionus.

== Species ==
These species belong to the genus Trachionus:

- Trachionus acarinatus Cui & van Achterberg, 2015
- Trachionus agromyzae (Rohwer, 1914)^{c g}
- Trachionus albitibialis Cui & van Achterberg, 2015
- Trachionus belfragei (Ashmead, 1889)^{c g}
- Trachionus brevisulcatus Cui & van Achterberg, 2015
- Trachionus hians (Nees, 1816)^{c g}
- Trachionus kotenkoi (Perepechayenko, 1997)^{c g}
- Trachionus lucidus (Rohwer, 1914)^{c g}
- Trachionus mandibularis (Nees, 1816)^{c g}
- Trachionus mandibularoides Cui & van Achterberg, 2015
- Trachionus microcephalus (Tobias, 1970)^{c g}
- Trachionus nigricornis (Rohwer, 1914)^{c g}
- Trachionus pappi (Zaykov, 1982)^{c g}
- Trachionus portlandicus (Rohwer, 1914)^{c g}
- Trachionus ringens (Haliday, 1839)^{c g}
- Trachionus rugosus (Zaykov, 1982)^{c g}
- Trachionus sericeus (Provancher, 1888)^{c g}

Data sources: i = ITIS, c = Catalogue of Life, g = GBIF, b = Bugguide.net
