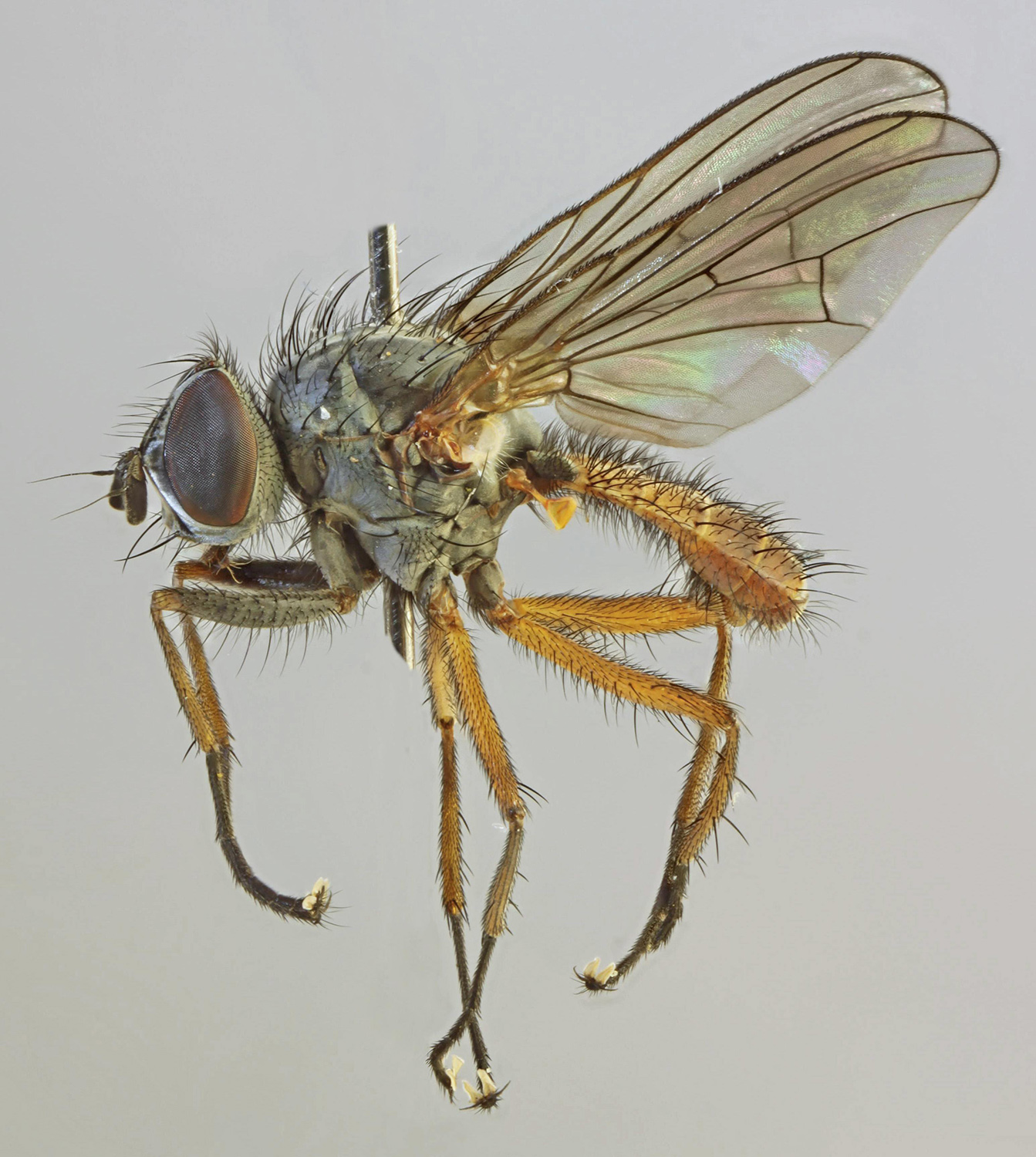
- Pegomya solennis North Wales.

Scientific classification
- Kingdom: Animalia
- Phylum: Arthropoda
- Class: Insecta
- Order: Diptera
- Family: Anthomyiidae
- Genus: Pegomya
- Species: P. solennis

Binomial name
- Pegomya solennis (Meigen, 1826)

= Pegomya solennis =

Species of fly

Pegomya solennis is a species of fly in the family Anthomyiidae. It is found in the Palearctic. For identification see:
