= Stephen E. Thorpe =

New Zealand entomologist (1970–2024)

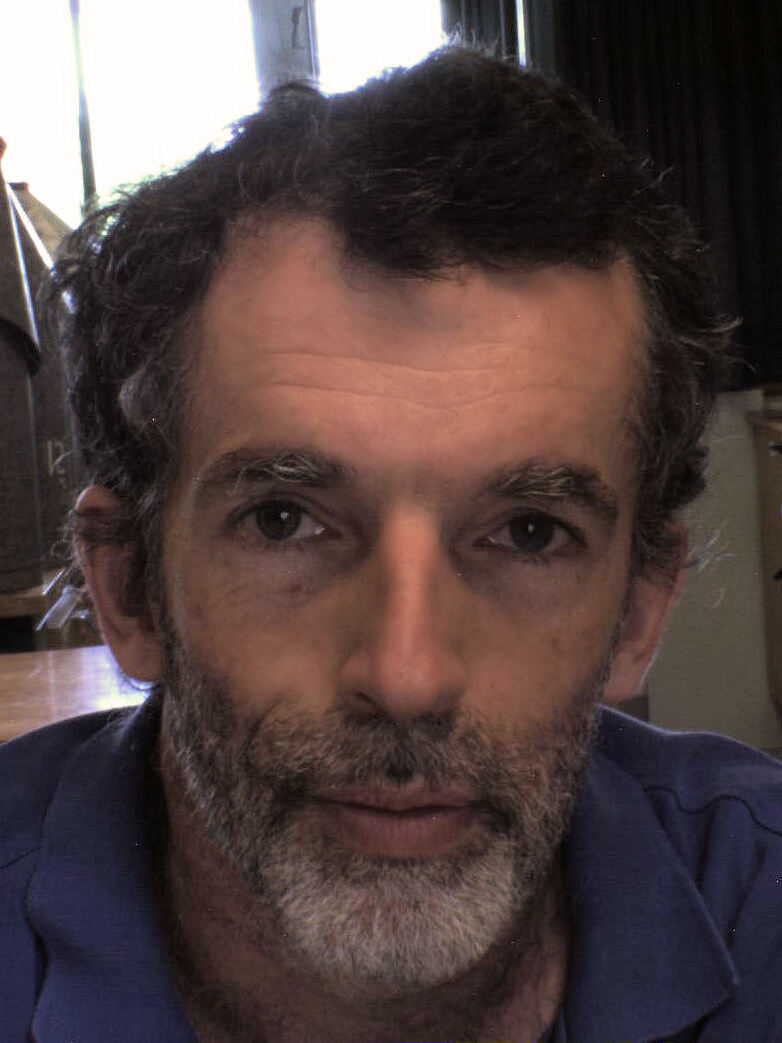
- Thorpe at the University of Auckland in 2012
- Born: 27 January 1970; Coventry, England, UK
- Died: 24 August 2024 (aged 54); Blockhouse Bay, Auckland, New Zealand
- Education: University of Auckland
- Scientific career
- Fields: Entomology
- Workplaces: University of Auckland; Auckland War Memorial Museum

Stephen Ernest Thorpe (27 January 1970 – 24 August 2024) was an English-born entomologist in New Zealand. He contributed vast amounts of data and analysis in many contexts, particularly to iNaturalist. Thorpe was a member of the research group that described the beetle genus Neodoxa in 2003. In 2011, he helped with describing the New Zealand marsh beetle species Stenocyphon neozealandicus by recognising the species among unsorted insect specimens at Auckland War Memorial Museum while he was volunteering. Fourteen species were named after Thorpe.

Thorpe was murdered on 24 August 2024 during his daily walk to search for insects and plants.

== Early life and education ==
Stephen Ernest Thorpe was born in England on 27 January 1970. He held a degree in chemistry and an MA in philosophy from the University of Auckland.

== Career ==
Thorpe became an independent entomologist from the late 1990s. He worked as a Research Associate at the University of Auckland from 2008 to 2011 and did contract work for Landcare Research and other organisations. In his latter years he was based at the Whau River Catchment Trust offices at the Blockhouse Bay Tennis Club in Auckland, and had told acquaintances that he thought he was on the autism spectrum.

Thorpe contributed 12,000 specimens to Auckland War Memorial Museum. He was a part of the research group who described the beetle genus Neodoxa in 2003, and in the same year, collected a specimen of gecko from Muriwai that would later become the holotype for the korowai gecko, when the species was formally described in 2023. A new species of New Zealand beetle, Cyparium thorpei, was named after him in 2004. In 2011, Thorpe was instrumental in describing the New Zealand marsh beetle species Stenocyphon neozealandicus, having recognised the species among unsorted insect specimens at Auckland War Memorial Museum as a volunteer. He contributed to biosecurity in New Zealand by reporting 39 species not previously found in the country to the Ministry for Primary Industries. He was a contributor to a number of taxonomic projects, including iNaturalist, Taxacom, Wikispecies, and ZooBank.

== Death ==
On 24 August 2024 Thorpe was murdered by an apparent intruder at the Blockhouse Bay Tennis Club and recreation area where he used an office for his work as he left on his daily walk to look for insects and plants. Police said that there was a "violent struggle" between Thorpe and his attacker. Thorpe was aged 54 at the time of his death. His only living family was his elderly father who lived in Brisbane. A 26-year-old local man was arrested on 28 August 2024 and charged with the murder. A karakia that was attended by dozens of community members was held at the scene where Thorpe was killed.

Thorpe's funeral service was held on 2 September 2024 at the same tennis club where he had worked and died. It was attended by around 200 people.

In 2025, the suspect was found unfit to stand trial, for reasons that were ordered by the judge to be suppressed, under section 10 of New Zealand's Criminal Procedure (Mentally Impaired Persons) Act. The judge also found that on the balance of probabilities he had killed Thorpe. He was ordered to be detained indefinitely at a secure psychiatric facility.

== Eponymy ==
Thorpe had thirteen species named in his honour before his death, with another subsequently.

- Alloxysta thorpei Ferrer-Suay & Pujade-Villar, 2012
- Bocchus thorpei Olmi, 2007
- Chorebus thorpei Berry, 2007
- Cryptoxilos thorpei Shaw & Berry, 2005
- Cyparium thorpei Löbl & Leschen, 2003
- Kaurimyia thorpei Winterton & Irwin, 2008
- Micromegistus thorpei Seeman, 2025
- Sagola thorpei Park & Carlton, 2014
- Scorpiurus thorpei Masunaga, 2017
- Sierola thorpei Magnacca, 2019
- Spathius thorpei Belokobylskij & Austin, 2013
- Uropoda thorpei Kontschán, 2012
- Zealantha thorpei Roháček, 2007
- Zelostemma thorpei Buhl, 2017

== Selected publications ==
- Klimaszewski, J.; Marris, J. W. M.; Thorpe, S. E. (January 2003). "The aleocharine rove beetle fauna of the Three Kings Islands, New Zealand (Coleoptera: Staphylinidae), with descriptions of two new species". New Zealand Journal of Zoology. 30 (2): 115–126. doi:10.1080/03014223.2003.9518330. ISSN 0301-4223. Wikidata Q54555452.
- Leschen, R.A.B.; Lawrence, J.F.; Kuschel, G.; Thorpe, S.; Wang, Q. (December 2003). "Coleoptera genera of New Zealand". New Zealand Entomologist. 26 (1): 15–28. doi:10.1080/00779962.2003.9722105. ISSN 0077-9962. Wikidata Q54588073.
- Ewers, Robert M.; Thorpe, Stephen; Didham, Raphael K. (1 January 2007). "Synergistic interactions between edge and area effects in a heavily fragmented landscape". Ecology. 88 (1): 96–106. doi:10.1890/0012-9658(2007)88[96:sibeaa]2.0.co;2. ISSN 0012-9658. PMID 17489458. Wikidata Q33284109.
- Ruta, Rafał; Thorpe, Stephen; Yoshitomi, Hiroyuki (29 November 2011). "Stenocyphon neozealandicus, a new species from New Zealand of a previously monotypic subfamily from Chile (Coleoptera: Scirtidae: Stenocyphoninae)". Zootaxa. 3113 (1): 65–68. doi:10.11646/zootaxa.3113.1.4. ISSN 1175-5334. Wikidata Q129806544.
- Campbell, Rebecca E.; Harding, Jon S.; Ewers, Robert M.; Thorpe, Stephen; Didham, Raphael K. (December 2011). "Production land use alters edge response functions in remnant forest invertebrate communities". Ecological Applications. 21 (8): 3147–3161. doi:10.1890/10-2390.1. ISSN 1051-0761. Wikidata Q54588064.
- Thorpe, Stephen E. (26 January 2017). "Is photography-based taxonomy really inadequate, unnecessary, and potentially harmful for biological sciences? A reply to Ceríaco et al. (2016)". Zootaxa. 4226 (3): 449–450. doi:10.11646/zootaxa.4226.3.9. ISSN 1175-5334. PMID 28187627. Wikidata Q28938028.
