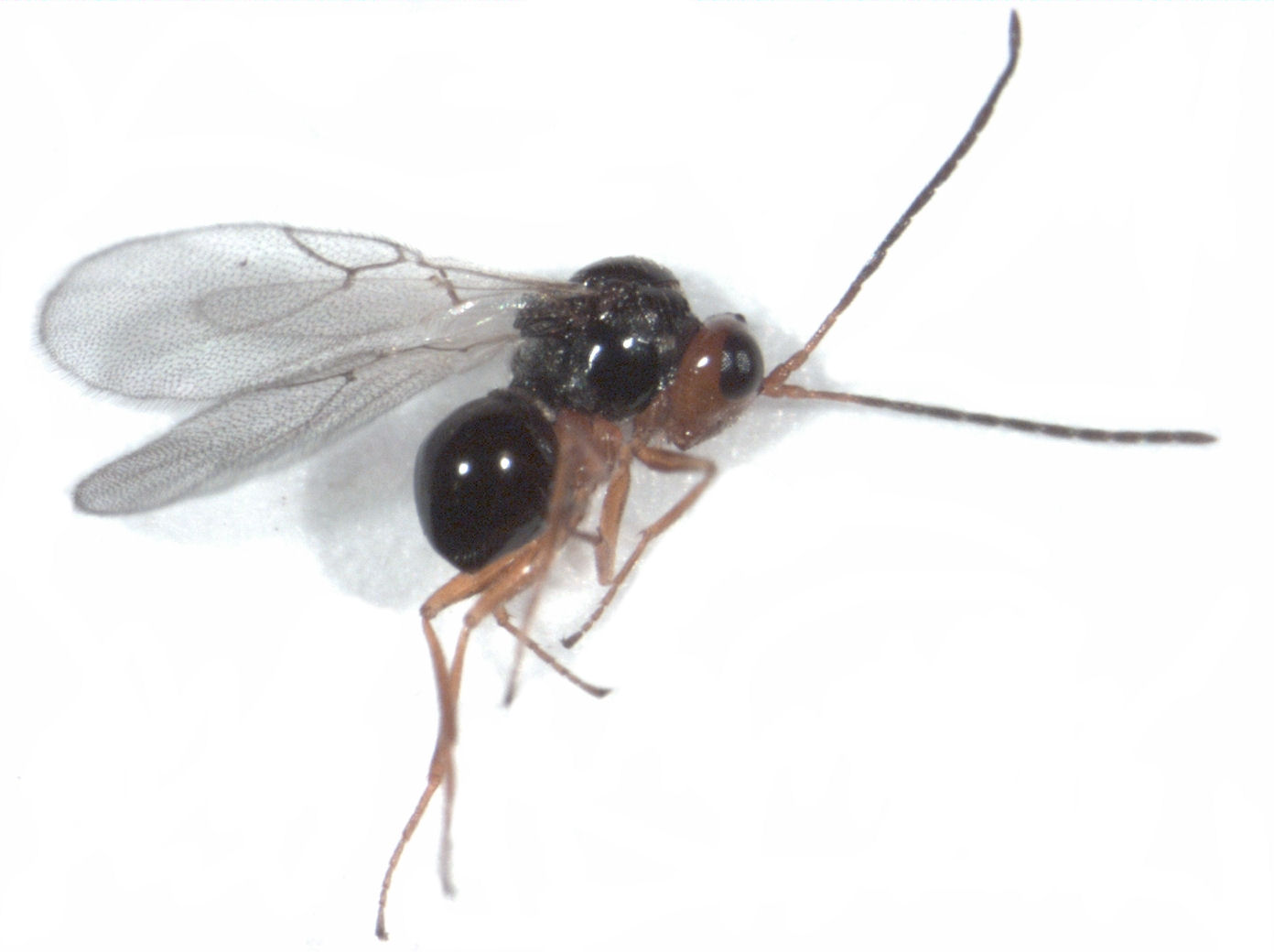
- Alloxysta victrix

Scientific classification
- Kingdom: Animalia
- Phylum: Arthropoda
- Class: Insecta
- Order: Hymenoptera
- Family: Figitidae
- Subfamily: Charipinae
- Genus: Alloxysta; Förster, 1869

Species
- See text

Synonyms
- Adelixysta Kierych, 1988; Allotria Westwood, 1833; Charips; Nephycta Forster, 1869; Pezophycta Forster, 1869; Thoreauana Girault, 1930; Xystus Hartig, 1840

= Alloxysta =

Genus of wasp

Alloxysta is a genus of wasps belonging to the family Figitidae. The genus was described by German entomologist Arnold Förster in 1869.

== Taxonomy ==
Förster described the genus in 1863, naming A. macrophadna as the type species..

== Distribution ==
The genus has a cosmopolitan distribution.

== Species ==
There are over a hundred species recognised in the genus Alloxysta:

- Alloxysta abdera Fergusson, 1986
- Alloxysta alpina Ferrer-Suay & Pujade-Villar, 2015
- Alloxysta andrewsi Ferrer-Suay & Pujade-Villar, 2011
- Alloxysta antananarivoi Ferrer-Suay & Pujade-Villar, 2012
- Alloxysta antsirananae Ferrer-Suay & Pujade-Villar, 2012
- Alloxysta aperta (Hartig, 1841)
- Alloxysta apteroidea Hellén, 1963
- Alloxysta arcuata (Kieffer, 1902)
- Alloxysta areeluckator Ferrer-Suay & Pujade-Villar, 2014
- Alloxysta asiatica Ferrer-Suay & Pujade-Villar, 2014
- Alloxysta aurata Belizin, 1968
- Alloxysta australiae (Ashmead, 1900)
- Alloxysta barbotini Ferrer-Suay & Pujade-Villar, 2016
- Alloxysta basimacula (Cameron, 1886)
- Alloxysta brachycera Hellén, 1963
- Alloxysta brachyptera (Hartig, 1840)
- Alloxysta brevis (Thomson, 1862)
- Alloxysta brevitarsis (Thomson, 1862)
- Alloxysta buffingtoni Ferrer-Suay & Pujade-Villar, 2014
- Alloxysta carinata Carver, 1992
- Alloxysta castanea (Hartig, 1841)
- Alloxysta centroamericana Ferrer-Suay & Pujade-Villar,2013
- Alloxysta circumscripta (Hartig, 1841)
- Alloxysta citripes (Thomson, 1862)
- Alloxysta commensuratus Andrews, 1978
- Alloxysta consobrina (Zetterstedt, 1840)
- Alloxysta costaricensis Ferrer-Suay & Pujade-Villar, 2011
- Alloxysta crassa (Cameron, 1890)
- Alloxysta crassicornis (Thomson, 1862)
- Alloxysta darci (Girault, 1933) Mary Carver
- Alloxysta desantisi Pujade-Villar & Díaz, 2002
- Alloxysta evenhuisi Ferrer-Suay & Pujade-Villar, 2013
- Alloxysta fracticornis (Thomson, 1862)
- Alloxysta franca Ferrer-Suay & Pujade-Villar, 2015
- Alloxysta fuscipes (Thomson, 1862)
- Alloxysta glebaria Hellén, 1963
- Alloxysta halterata (Thomson, 1862)
- Alloxysta hansoni Ferrer-Suay & Pujade-Villar, 2011
- Alloxysta hendrickxi (Benoit, 1956)
- Alloxysta heptatoma Hellen, 1963
- Alloxysta huberi Ferrer-Suay & Pujade-Villar, 2014
- Alloxysta japonicus (Ashmead, 1904)
- Alloxysta kovilovica Ferrer-Suay & Pujade-Villar, 2013
- Alloxysta lachni (Ashmead, 1885)
- Alloxysta leunisii (Hartig, 1841)
- Alloxysta longipennis (Hartig, 1841)
- Alloxysta longipennis (Hartig, 1841)
- Alloxysta longiventris Baker, 1896
- Alloxysta luismii Ferrer-Suay, 2011
- Alloxysta macrophadna (Hartig, 1841)
- Alloxysta mara Paretas-Martinez & Pujade-Villar, 2005
- Alloxysta marshalliana (Kieffer, 1900)
- Alloxysta medinae Ferrer-Suay & Pujade-Villar, 2012
- Alloxysta melanogaster (Hartig, 1840)
- Alloxysta mexicana Ferrer-Suay & Pujade-Villar, 2013
- Alloxysta minuscula Andrews, 1978
- Alloxysta mullensis (Cameron, 1883)
- Alloxysta nearctica Ferrer-Suay & Pujade-Villar, 2014
- Alloxysta nepalica Ferrer-Suay & Pujade-Villar, 2014
- Alloxysta nigricans Hellen, 1963
- Alloxysta nigrita (Thomson, 1862)
- Alloxysta nippona Ferrer-Suay & Pujade-Villar, 2014
- Alloxysta nothofagi Andrews, 1976
- Alloxysta nottoni Ferrer-Suay & Pujade-Villar, 2015
- Alloxysta obscurata (Hartig, 1840)
- Alloxysta palearctica Ferrer-Suay & Pujade-Villar, 2018
- Alloxysta pallidicornis (Curtis, 1838)
- Alloxysta paretasmartinezi Ferrer-Suay & Pujade-Villar, 2014
- Alloxysta pascuali Ferrer-Suay, 2018
- Alloxysta patens Hellen, 1963
- Alloxysta pedestris (Curtis, 1838)
- Alloxysta petchabunensis Ferrer-Suay & Pujade-Villar, 2015
- Alloxysta piceomaculata (Cameron, 1883)
- Alloxysta pilae Ferrer-Suay, 2015
- Alloxysta pilipennis (Hartig, 1840)
- Alloxysta pilosa Ferrer-Suay & Pujade-Villar, 2014
- Alloxysta pleuralis (Cameron, 1879)
- Alloxysta postica (Hartig, 1841)
- Alloxysta proxima Belizin, 1962
- Alloxysta pseudoconsobrina Ferrer-Suay, 2017
- Alloxysta pusilla (Kieffer, 1902)
- Alloxysta quedenfeldti (Kieffer, 1909)
- Alloxysta ramulifera (Thomson, 1862)
- Alloxysta rubidus Ferrer-Suay & Pujade-Villar, 2012
- Alloxysta rufiventris (Hartig, 1840)
- Alloxysta salicicola Belizin, 1973
- Alloxysta samurai Ferrer-Suay & Pujade-Villar, 2014
- Alloxysta sarae Ferrer-Suay & Pujade-Villar, 2013
- Alloxysta sawoniewiczi (Kierych, 1988)
- Alloxysta semiaperta Fergusson, 1986
- Alloxysta sharkeyi Ferrer-Suay & Pujade-Villar, 2014
- Alloxysta simplex (Watanabe, 1950)
- Alloxysta slovenica Ferrer-Suay & Pujade-Villar, 2013
- Alloxysta soluta Hellen, 1963
- Alloxysta staryi Ferrer-Suay & Pujade-Villar, in prep
- Alloxysta texanae Ferrer-Suay & Pujade-Villar, 2014
- Alloxysta thorpei Ferrer-Suay & Pujade-Villar, 2012
- Alloxysta tscheki (Giraud, 1860)
- Alloxysta torresi Ferrer-Suay & Pujade-Villar, 2012
- Alloxysta vandenboschi Andrews, 1978
- Alloxysta versicolor (Kieffer, 1904)
- Alloxysta vicenti Ferrer-Suay & Pujade-Villar, 2014
- Alloxysta victrix (Westwood, 1833)
- Alloxysta viellae Ferrer-Suay & Pujade-Villar, 2013
- Alloxysta xanthocera (Thomson, 1862)
- Alloxysta xanthopa (Thomson, 1862)
- Alloxysta xanthopsis (Ashmead, 1896)
