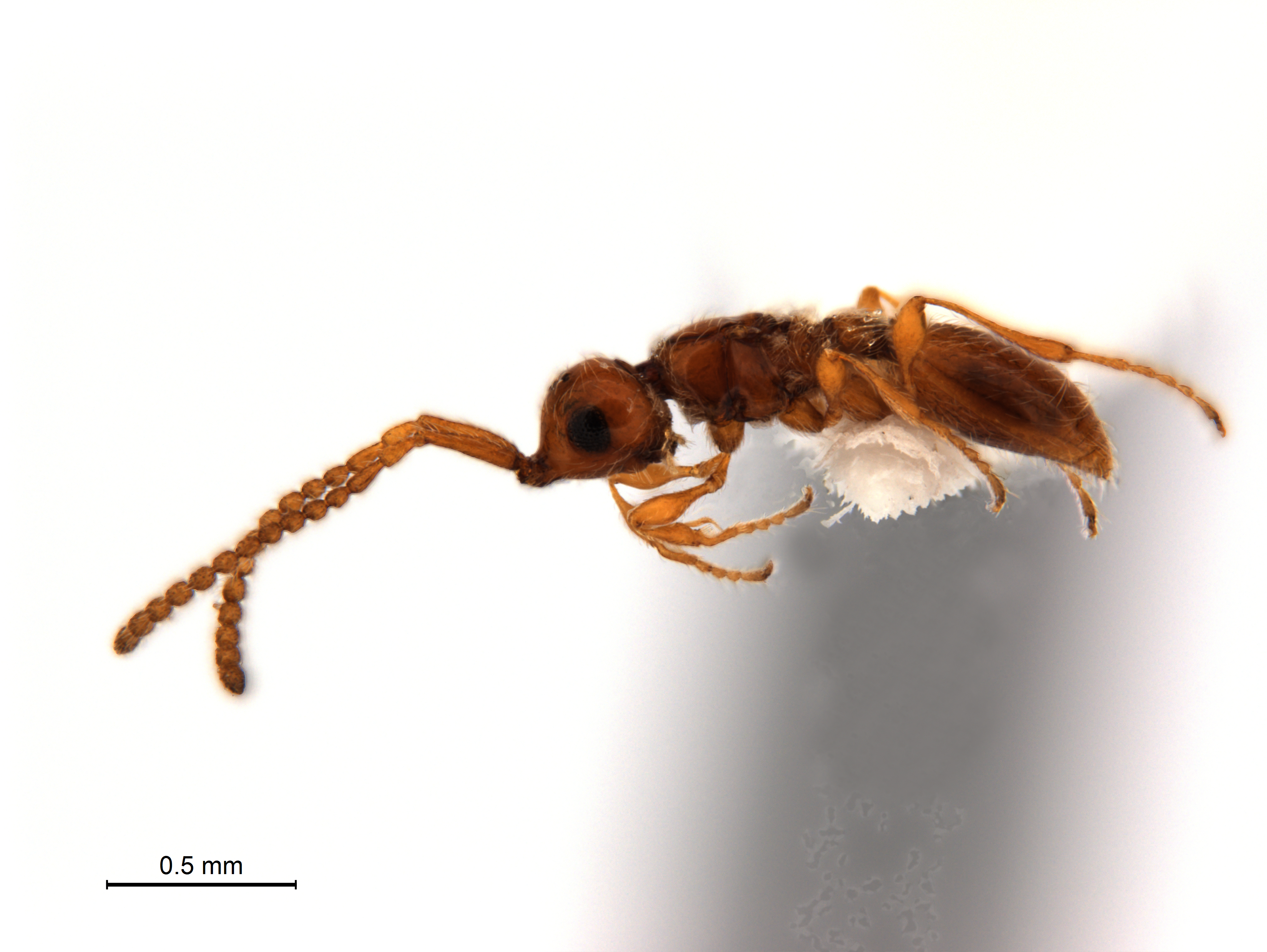
- Maoripria earlyi

Scientific classification
- Kingdom: Animalia
- Phylum: Arthropoda
- Class: Insecta
- Order: Hymenoptera
- Family: Diapriidae
- Subfamily: Ambositrinae; Masner, 1961

= Ambositrinae =

Subfamily of wasps

Ambositrinae is a subfamily of parasitoid wasps, within Diapriidae. The subfamily was first described by Canadian entomologist Lubomir Masner in 1961. Most species have a Gondwanan distribution, being found in Australia, New Guinea, New Zealand and South America.

== Taxonomy ==
Ambositrinae contains the following genera:

- Acanthobetyla
- Ambositra
- Archaeopria
- Betyla
- Diphoropria
- Gwaihiria
- Maoripria
- Pantolytomyia
- Parabetyla
- Propsilomma
- Zealaptera
