= Leaiopria termitarii =

Scientific classification
- Kingdom: Animalia
- Phylum: Arthropoda
- Clade: Pancrustacea
- Class: Insecta
- Order: Hymenoptera
- Family: Diapriidae
- Subfamily: Diapriinae
- Genus: Leaiopria
- Species: L. termitarii

Binomial name
- Leaiopria termitarii Dodd, 1915

Species of wasp

Leaiopria termitarii is a species of parasitoid wasp in the subfamily Diapriinae of the Diapriidae family, and was first described in 1915 by Alan Parkhurst Dodd. The species was redescribed in 1980 by Ian D. Naumann and Lubomír Masner.

This species of wasp is endemic to Australia (South Australia), and is closely associated with Nasutitermes fumigatus termites, from whose subterranean galleries it has been collected.

It is thought that Leaiopria termitarii may parasitize immature stages of the termite N. fumigatus.
