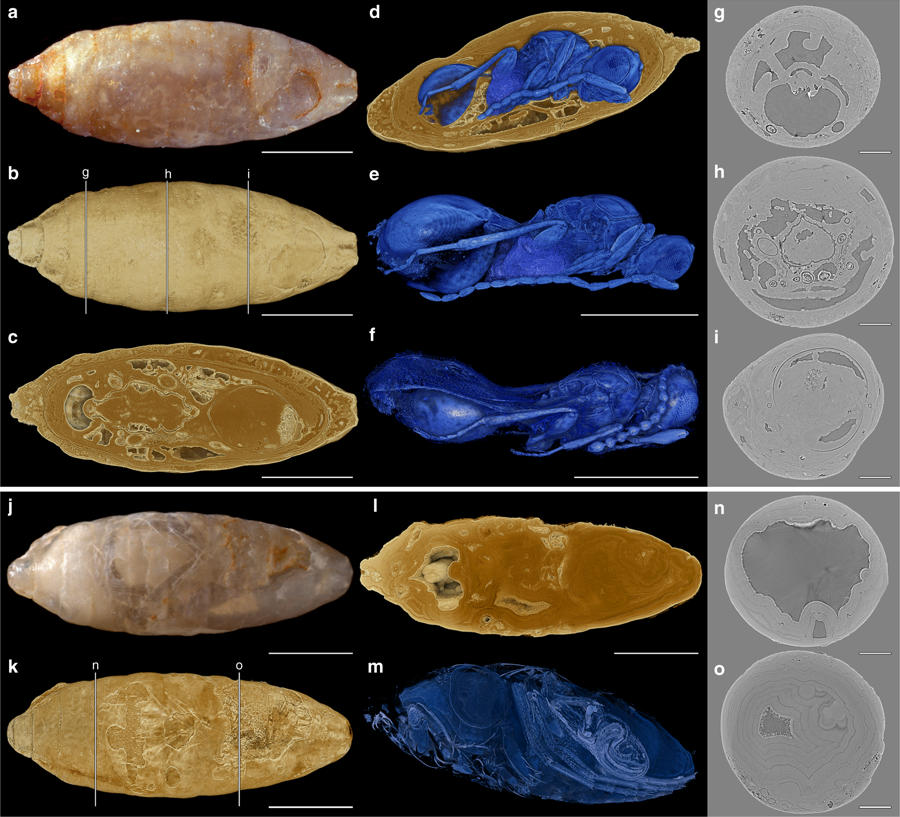
- X-ray tomography of X. resurrecta fossils inside host fly pupae

Scientific classification
- Kingdom: Animalia
- Phylum: Arthropoda
- Clade: Pancrustacea
- Class: Insecta
- Order: Hymenoptera
- Family: Diapriidae
- Subfamily: Diapriinae
- Tribe: Spilomicrini
- Genus: †Xenomorphia; Krogmann, van de Kamp & Schwermann, 2018

Type species
- †Xenomorphia resurrecta Krogmann, van de Kamp & Schwermann, 2018

Species
- †X. resurrecta Krogmann, van de Kamp & Schwermann, 2018; †X. handschini Krogmann, van de Kamp & Schwermann, 2018

= Xenomorphia =

Xenomorphia Temporal range: Chattian

Extinct genus of wasps

Xenomorphia is an extinct genus of parasitoid wasp comprising two species: X. resurrecta (the type species) and X. handschini. The generic name is in reference to the parasitic Xenomorph creature starring in the Alien franchise. The wasp's first fossils were discovered in Oligocene (Chattian) aged phosphorite mines located in the former Quercy province of France, the remains of 55 ancient fly (Phoridae) pupae were found preserved with Xenomorphia wasps inside of them, recording a parasitic relationship between the two insects. Along with the two Xenomorphia wasp species, two other new wasp taxa were identified, Coptera anka, and Palaeortona quercyensis.
