= Leaiopria =

Scientific classification
- Kingdom: Animalia
- Phylum: Arthropoda
- Clade: Pancrustacea
- Class: Insecta
- Order: Hymenoptera
- Superfamily: Proctotrupoidea
- Family: Diapriidae
- Subfamily: Diapriinae
- Genus: Leaiopria; Dodd, 1915

Genus of wasps

Leaiopria is a genus of parasitoid wasps in the subfamily, Diapriinae, of the Diapriidae family and was first described in 1915 by Alan Parkhurst Dodd. The type species is Leaiopria termitarii Dodd, 1915. The genus was redescribed in 1980 by Ian D. Naumann and L. Masner.

Wasps of this genus are found solely in Australia, and are closely associated with Nasutitermes termites. The close association of each species each with a single termite species has led to the likelihood that each wasp species has co-evolved with each termite species. Whether the termite associates are hosts parasitized by these wasps is not known. Species of this genus are subterranean species, with similar habits.

== Species ==
Accepted species listed by the Australian Faunal Directory and IRMNG are:

- Leaiopria termitarii Dodd, 1915
- Leaiopria wildi Naumann & Masner, 1980
