= Leaiopria wildi =

Scientific classification
- Kingdom: Animalia
- Phylum: Arthropoda
- Clade: Pancrustacea
- Class: Insecta
- Order: Hymenoptera
- Superfamily: Proctotrupoidea
- Family: Diapriidae
- Subfamily: Diapriinae
- Species: L. wildi

Binomial name
- Leaiopria wildi Naumann & Masner, 1980

Species of wasp

Leaiopria wildi is a species of parasitoid wasp in the subfamily Diapriinae of the family, Diapriidae, and was first described in 1980 by Ian D. Naumann & Lubomír Masner.

This species of wasp is endemic to Australia (Victoria), and is closely associated with Nasutitermes dixoni termites, from whose subterranean galleries it has been collected.

It is thought that Leaiopria wildi may parasitize immature stages of the termite N. dixoni.
