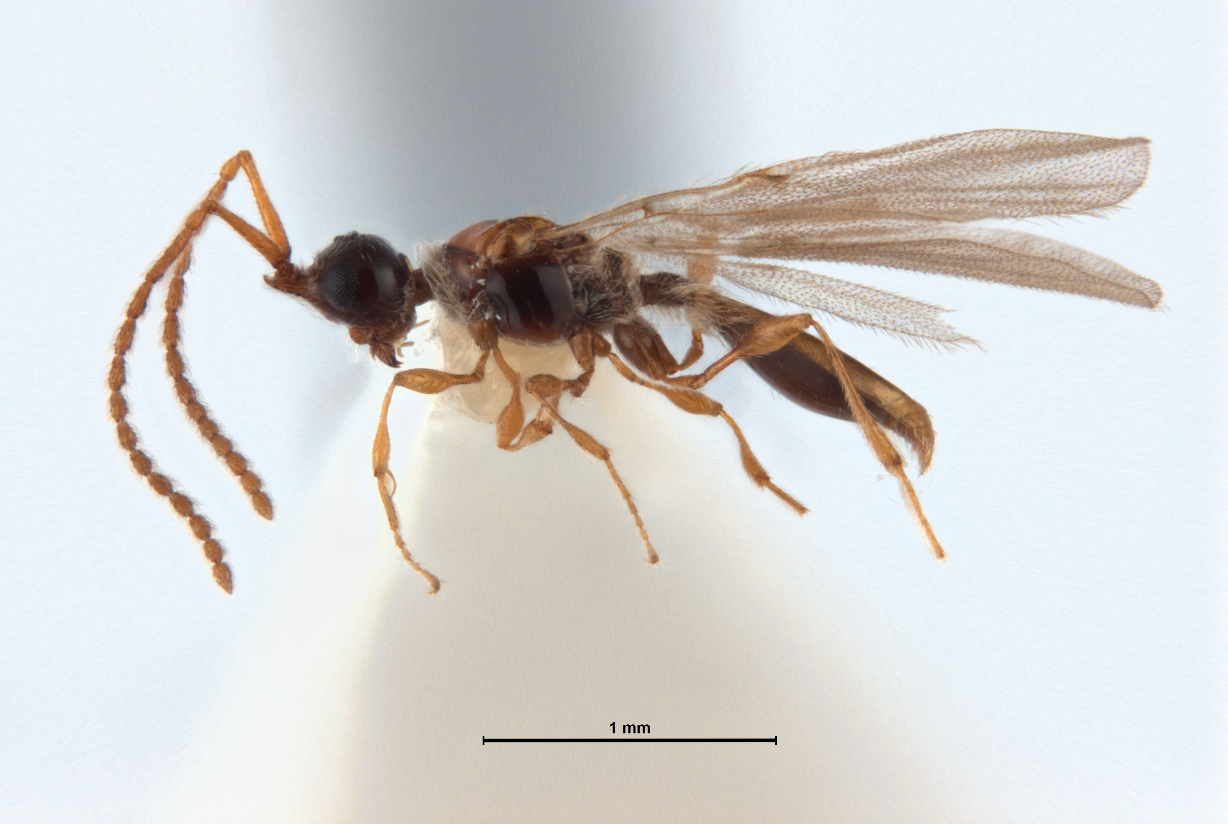
- specimen AMNZ81967 collected in Waitewhena Forest on 2005-02-12

Scientific classification
- Kingdom: Animalia
- Phylum: Arthropoda
- Clade: Pancrustacea
- Class: Insecta
- Order: Hymenoptera
- Family: Diapriidae
- Genus: Archaeopria
- Species: A. pelor

Binomial name
- Archaeopria pelor Naumann, 1988

= Archaeopria pelor =

Species of wasp

Archaeopria pelor is a species of parasitoid wasp belonging to the family Diapriidae.

The species was first described in 1988 by Ian D. Naumann, and is endemic to New Zealand.
