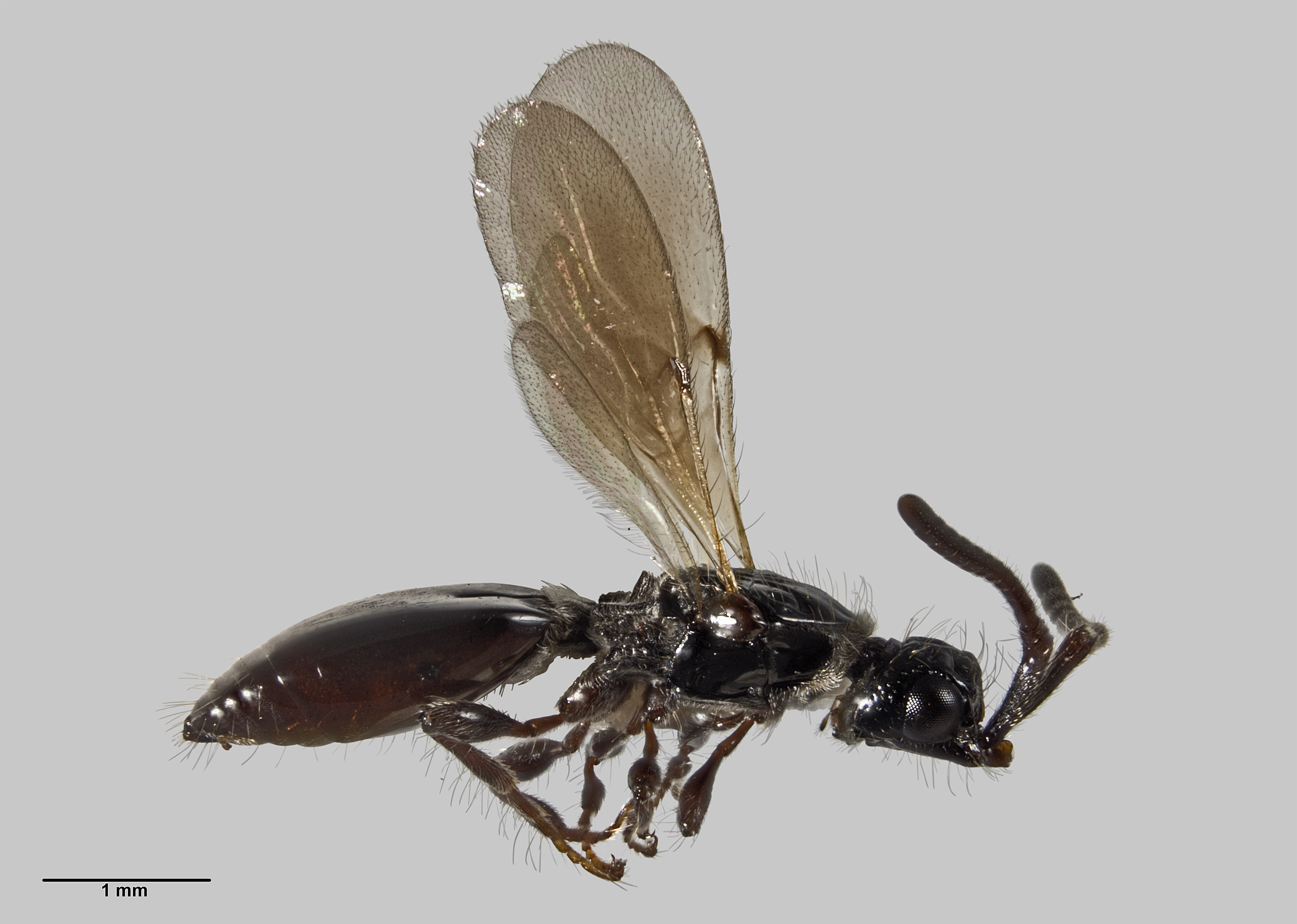
- Neurogalesus carinatus

Scientific classification
- Kingdom: Animalia
- Phylum: Arthropoda
- Clade: Pancrustacea
- Class: Insecta
- Order: Hymenoptera
- Family: Diapriidae
- Subfamily: Diapriinae
- Tribe: Spilomicrini

= Spilomicrini =

Tribe of wasps

Spilomicrini is a tribe of parasitoid wasps.

== Genera ==
- Atomopria
- Bruchopria
- Chilomicrus
- Doddius
- Entomacis
- Epomium
- Ferrugenus
- Idiotypa
- Neurogalesus
- Paramesius
- Pentapria
- Poecilopsilus
- Rostropria
- Spilomicrus
- Xenismarus
