= Belyta elegans =

Scientific classification
- Kingdom: Animalia
- Phylum: Arthropoda
- Class: Insecta
- Order: Hymenoptera
- Family: Diapriidae
- Genus: Belyta
- Species: B. elegans

Binomial name
- Belyta elegans Kieffer, 1909

Species of wasp

Belyta elegans is a species of diapriid wasps found in Europe.
