= Pantolytomyia tungane =

Scientific classification
- Kingdom: Animalia
- Phylum: Arthropoda
- Class: Insecta
- Order: Hymenoptera
- Family: Diapriidae
- Genus: Pantolytomyia
- Species: P. tungane

Binomial name
- Pantolytomyia tungane Naumann, 1988

Species of parasitic wasp

Pantolytomyia tungane is a species of diapriid wasp, and was first described in 1988 by the Australian entomologist, Ian D. Naumann. The species epithet, tungane, is Maori for "brother", and refers to its likeness to P. flocculosa.

This wasp is endemic to New Zealand, and like all Diapriidae is parasitic.

The type specimens were collected from sifted litter, and by sweeping low vegetation, and from boggy areas, in various forests (broadleaf forest, Agathis forest, Dracophyllum forest, and Nothofagus menziesii forest) at altitudes of between 20 m and 1066 m.
