= Archaeopria eriodes =

Scientific classification
- Kingdom: Animalia
- Phylum: Arthropoda
- Clade: Pancrustacea
- Class: Insecta
- Order: Hymenoptera
- Family: Diapriidae
- Genus: Archaeopria
- Species: A. eriodes

Binomial name
- Archaeopria eriodes Naumann, 1988

Species of wasp

Archaeopria eriodes is a species of parasitoid wasp belonging to the family Diapriidae.

The species was first described in 1988 by Ian D. Naumann, and is endemic to New Zealand.
