= Betyla karamea =

Scientific classification
- Kingdom: Animalia
- Phylum: Arthropoda
- Clade: Pancrustacea
- Class: Insecta
- Order: Hymenoptera
- Family: Diapriidae
- Genus: Betyla
- Species: B. karamea

Binomial name
- Betyla karamea Naumann, 1988

Species of wasp

Betyla karamea is a species of diapriid wasp found in New Zealand.

This species was first described in 1988 by Ian D. Naumann, and the species epithet, karamea, means red ochre in Maori.

This wasp is endemic to New Zealand, where it has been found in the "largely unglaciated North Island" and in the "glacial refugia in the north of the South Island", in leaf "litter and moss in Agathis forest and mixed broadleaf / podocarp forest, at altitudes between 70 m and 1250 m".
