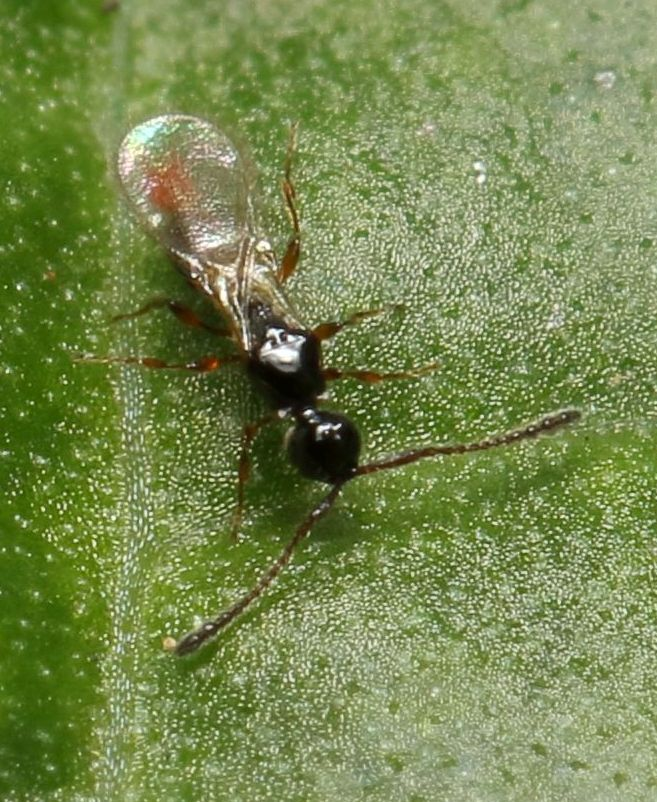
- Female

Scientific classification
- Kingdom: Animalia
- Phylum: Arthropoda
- Clade: Pancrustacea
- Class: Insecta
- Order: Hymenoptera
- Family: Diapriidae
- Subfamily: Diapriinae
- Genus: Trichopria; Ashmead, 1893

= Trichopria =

Genus of parasitic wasps

Trichopria is a genus of parasitoid wasps in the family Diapriidae. These wasps are known for their role in biological control, parasitizing various insects such as flies, and are distributed worldwide.

== Species ==
The following species are recognised in the genus Trichopria:

- Trichopria abdominalis Fouts, 1926
- Trichopria acuminata Dodd, 1915
- Trichopria acuta (Dodd, 1915)
- Trichopria acutiventris (Brues, 1902)
- Trichopria affinis (Ashmead, 1893)
- Trichopria agromyzae (Fitch, 1856)
- Trichopria angustipennis Muesebeck, 1939
- Trichopria armata (Ashmead, 1888)
- Trichopria atrichomelinae Muesebeck, 1972
- Trichopria atricorpus Dodd, 1915
- Trichopria bifovea Kieffer, 1895
- Trichopria bifoveolata (Ashmead, 1893)
- Trichopria californica (Ashmead, 1893)
- Trichopria carolinensis Ashmead, 1893
- Trichopria clarimontis (Kieffer, 1906)
- Trichopria columbiana (Ashmead, 1893)
- Trichopria crassiclava (Kieffer, 1906)
- Trichopria dentata Muesebeck, 1967
- Trichopria discreta Muesebeck, 1893
- Trichopria drosophilae
- Trichopria erythropus (Ashmead, 1893)
- Trichopria erythrothorax (Ashmead, 1887)
- Trichopria fimicola (Ferrière, 1933)
- Trichopria flavipes Ashmead, 1893
- Trichopria floridana (Ashmead, 1887)
- Trichopria floridensis (Ashmead, 1887)
- Trichopria foveata (Kieffer, 1908)
- Trichopria giraulti Dodd, 1916
- Trichopria globiceps (Dodd, 1916)
- Trichopria haematobiae (Ashmead, 1893)
- Trichopria harringtoni (Ashmead, 1888)
- Trichopria hirticollis (Ashmead, 1887)
- Trichopria infuscatipes (Ashmead, 1893)
- Trichopria kiefferi Muesebeck, 1979
- Trichopria laeviventris (Dodd, 1915)
- Trichopria longiclava Dodd, 1915
- Trichopria megaplasta (Ashmead, 1893)
- Trichopria melanocera (Kieffer, 1906)
- Trichopria minutissima (Ashmead, 1893)
- Trichopria montana (Ashmead, 1893)
- Trichopria muscae (Ashmead, 1893)
- Trichopria myoleptae Muesebeck, 1967
- Trichopria nevadensis (Kieffer, 1906)
- Trichopria nigricorpus Dodd, 1915
- Trichopria norfolcensis (Dodd, 1924)
- Trichopria occidentalis (Fouts, 1927)
- Trichopria pacifica Ashmead, 1893
- Trichopria paludis Muesebeck, 1939
- Trichopria parva (Ashmead, 1893)
- Trichopria pentaplasta Ashmead, 1893
- Trichopria pezomachoides (Ashmead, 1888)
- Trichopria popei (Muesebeck)
- Trichopria popenoei Ashmead
- Trichopria provancheri (Kieffer, 1916)
- Trichopria pulchrithorax (Dodd, 1915)
- Trichopria quadrata Dodd, 1916
- Trichopria rubrithorax (Dodd, 1915)
- Trichopria rufipes Ashmead, 1893
- Trichopria schwarzii (Ashmead, 1893)
- Trichopria semicastanea (Dodd, 1915)
- Trichopria tabanivora Fouts, 1926
- Trichopria tetraplasta (Ashmead, 1893)
- Trichopria texana (Ashmead, 1893)
- Trichopria unifoveata (Kieffer, 1906)
- Trichopria utahensis (Ashmead, 1893)
- Trichopria villosicornis (Kieffer, 1906)
- Trichopria virginica (Ashmead, 1893)
- Trichopria virginiensis Masner, 1893
- Trichopria zimmermanni Ashmead, 1893

=== Extinct species ===
- †Trichopria electrosinica Brazidec & Perrichot, 2025
