= Betyla thegalea =

Scientific classification
- Kingdom: Animalia
- Phylum: Arthropoda
- Clade: Pancrustacea
- Class: Insecta
- Order: Hymenoptera
- Family: Diapriidae
- Genus: Betyla
- Species: B. thegalea

Binomial name
- Betyla thegalea Naumann, 1988

Species of wasp

Betyla thegalea is a species of diapriid wasp found in New Zealand.

This species was first described in 1988 by Ian D. Naumann, (from female specimens only) found in leaf litter at altitudes higher than 600 m. The species epithet, thegalea (Greek- "pointed") 'refers to the shape of the gaster'.

The females are a reddish brown to reddish orange. The legs are a reddish orange to yellow. The setae are silver.'

This wasp is endemic to New Zealand.
