= Pantolytomyia takere =

Scientific classification
- Kingdom: Animalia
- Phylum: Arthropoda
- Class: Insecta
- Order: Hymenoptera
- Family: Diapriidae
- Genus: Pantolytomyia
- Species: P. takere

Binomial name
- Pantolytomyia takere Naumann, 1988

Species of parasitic wasp

Pantolytomyia takere is a species of diapriid wasp, and was first described in 1988 by the Australian entomologist, Ian D. Naumann. The species epithet, takere, is Maori, and means "chief man".

This wasp is endemic to New Zealand, and like all Diapriidae is parasitic.

The holotype (female) was swept from ferns in podocarp, broadleaf forest on the Lake Wombat Track in Westland National Park.
