= Parabetyla tahi =

Scientific classification
- Domain: Eukaryota
- Kingdom: Animalia
- Phylum: Arthropoda
- Class: Insecta
- Order: Hymenoptera
- Family: Diapriidae
- Genus: Parabetyla
- Species: P. tahi

Binomial name
- Parabetyla tahi Naumann, 1988

Species of parasitic wasp

Parabetyla tahi is a species of diapriid wasp, and was first described in 1988 by the Australian entomologist, Ian D. Naumann. The species epithet, tahi (Māori "one") refers to the 'single propodeal tubercle'. The specimens described were female only and were collected on both the North and South Islands from 'grass, sedge, and ferns in Nothofagus fusca and podocarp forests at altitudes of between 90 m and 140 m'.

This wasp is endemic to New Zealand, and like all Diapriidae is parasitic.
