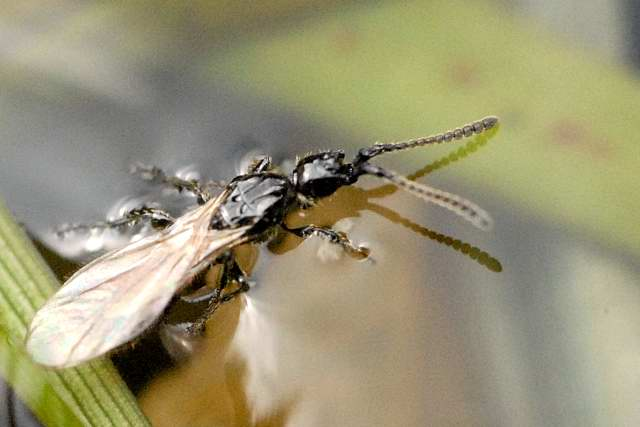
- Spilomicrus stigmaticalis

Scientific classification
- Kingdom: Animalia
- Phylum: Arthropoda
- Clade: Pancrustacea
- Class: Insecta
- Order: Hymenoptera
- Family: Diapriidae
- Subfamily: Diapriinae
- Tribe: Spilomicrini
- Genus: Spilomicrus; Westwood, 1832

Synonyms
- Szelenyioprioides

= Spilomicrus =

Genus of wasps

Spilomicrus is a genus of hymenopterans in the family Diapriidae.

== North American species ==
- Spilomicrus abnormis Marshall, 1868^{g}
- Spilomicrus acuminatus (Herrich-Schäffer, 1838)^{g}
- Spilomicrus annulicornis Kieffer, 1911^{g}
- Spilomicrus antennatus (Jurine, 1807)^{g}
- Spilomicrus apterygus (Kieffer, 1904)^{g}
- Spilomicrus autumnalis Kieffer, 1911^{g}
- Spilomicrus barbatus Szabo, 1983^{g}
- Spilomicrus barnesi Early & Horning, 1978^{c g}
- Spilomicrus basalyformis Marshall, 1868^{g}
- Spilomicrus bipunctatus Kieffer, 1911^{g}
- Spilomicrus carinatus Kieffer, 1911^{g}
- Spilomicrus carolae Early, 1980^{c g}
- Spilomicrus clavatus (Herrich-Schäffer, 1838)^{g}
- Spilomicrus compressus Thomson, 1859^{g}
- Spilomicrus crassiclavis Kieffer, 1911^{g}
- Spilomicrus crassipes Kieffer, 1911^{g}
- Spilomicrus cursor Kieffer, 1911^{g}
- Spilomicrus flavipes Thomson, 1859^{g}
- Spilomicrus formosus Jansson, 1942^{g}
- Spilomicrus gracilicornis Kieffer, 1911^{g}
- Spilomicrus hemipterus Marshall, 1868^{g}
- Spilomicrus inaequalis Tomsik, 1947^{g}
- Spilomicrus integer Thomson, 1858^{g}
- Spilomicrus kaszabi Szabo, 1977^{g}
- Spilomicrus lubomasneri^{g}
- Spilomicrus lusitanicus (Kieffer, 1910)^{g}
- Spilomicrus major Vollenhoven, 1879^{g}
- Spilomicrus mediofurcatus Szabo, 1983^{g}
- Spilomicrus modestus Tomsik, 1947^{g}
- Spilomicrus moniliatus (Herrich-Schäffer, 1838)^{g}
- Spilomicrus niger (Kieffer, 1910)^{g}
- Spilomicrus nigriclavis Marshall, 1868^{g}
- Spilomicrus noctiger Szabo, 1977^{g}
- Spilomicrus notaulus^{g}
- Spilomicrus nottoni^{g}
- Spilomicrus obtusus (Herrich-Schäffer, 1838)^{g}
- Spilomicrus pelion Nixon, 1980^{g}
- Spilomicrus pilgrimi Early, 1978^{c g}
- Spilomicrus pillicornis Szabo, 1977^{g}
- Spilomicrus procerus (Haliday, 1857)^{g}
- Spilomicrus pseudocursor Szabo, 1974^{g}
- Spilomicrus punctatus Kozlov, 1978^{g}
- Spilomicrus quinquepunctatus (Szabo, 1961)^{g}
- Spilomicrus radialis (Herrich-Schäffer, 1838)^{g}
- Spilomicrus rufitarsis Kieffer, 1911^{g}
- Spilomicrus rufithorax (Kieffer, 1910)^{g}
- Spilomicrus sanbornei Masner, 1991^{g}
- Spilomicrus simplex Tomsik, 1947^{g}
- Spilomicrus stigmaticalis Westwood, 1832^{g}
- Spilomicrus striatifoveatus Szabo, 1960^{g}
- Spilomicrus subarmatus Kieffer, 1911^{g}
- Spilomicrus szelenyii Szabo, 1977^{g}
- Spilomicrus thomsoni Kieffer, 1911^{g}
- Spilomicrus varipes (Herrich-Schäffer, 1838)^{g}

Data sources: i = ITIS, c = Catalogue of Life, g = GBIF, b = Bugguide.net
