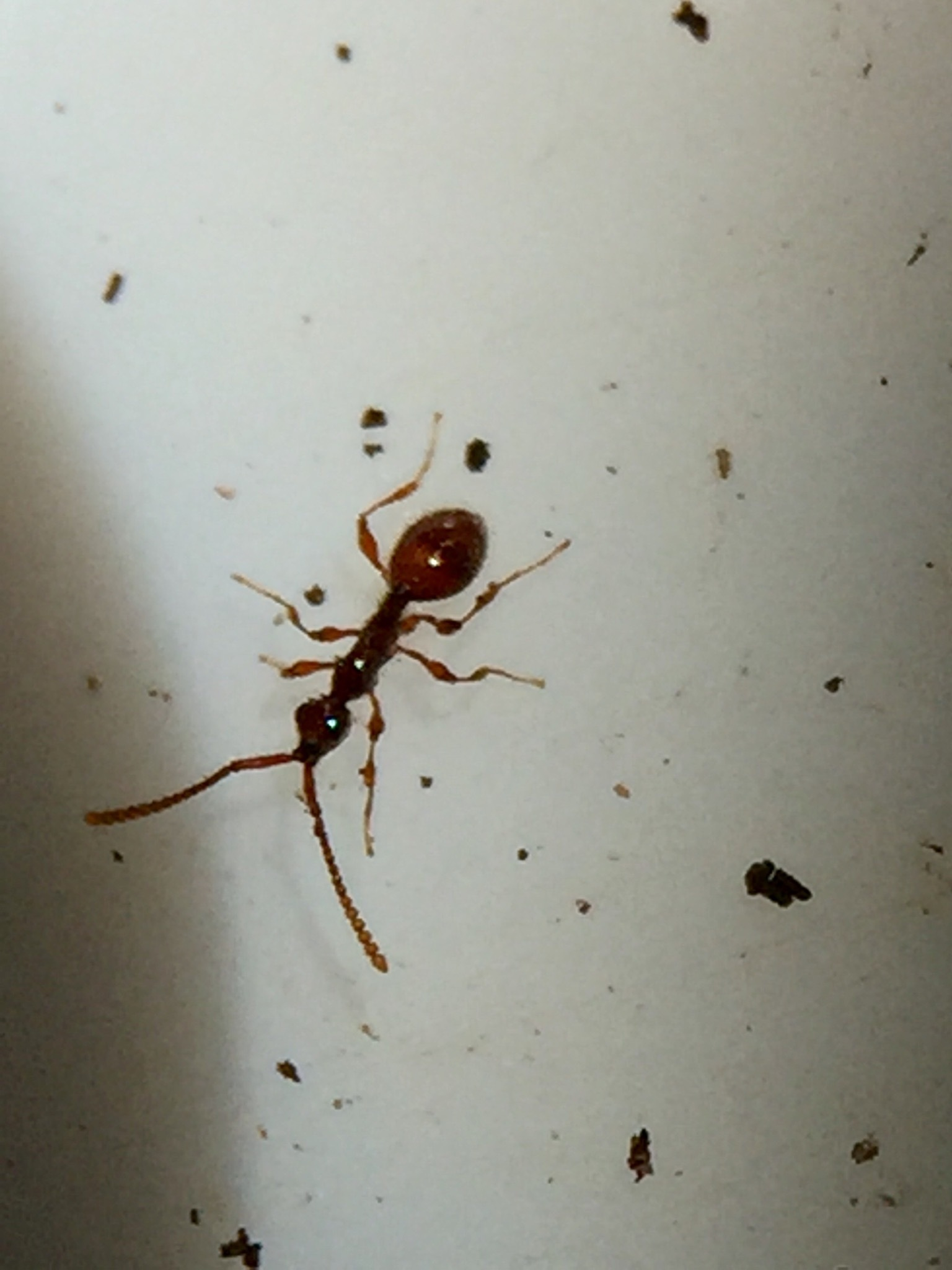
- Image of B. fulva by Stephen E. Thorpe

Scientific classification
- Kingdom: Animalia
- Phylum: Arthropoda
- Class: Insecta
- Order: Hymenoptera
- Family: Diapriidae
- Genus: Betyla
- Species: B. fulva

Binomial name
- Betyla fulva Cameron, 1889

= Betyla fulva =

Species of wasp

Betyla fulva is a species of diapriid wasp found in New Zealand. It is commonly known as the glow worm parasite. It was first described by Peter Cameron in 1889.

== Taxonomy ==
This species was first described by Peter Cameron in 1889 and named Betyla fulva using a specimen collected in Greymouth by Richard Helms.

This species was described a second time by the Rev. T.A. Marshall, based on a single specimen which emerged from the pupae of Arachnocampa luminosa, after being collected by George Hudson in Wellington. However, this was later found to be the same species as previously described by Cameron.

== Description ==
Cameron first described this species as follows:

The mesothorax is almost glabrous, and much more shining than the rest of the body. The abdomen is haired all over, but not very thickly, and the hair is longish, and whiter towards the apex. The tibiae and tarsi are covered with short, stiff white hairs, the femora more sparsely with longer, soft hair. At the apex the metanotum is convex, projecting into sharp teeth at the sides, and is very closely united to the petiole, which is longer and a little narrower than it.

In order to tell this species apart from other Betyla species, look at "the prominent pronotal spiracular process" on females, or the "emarginate F1" on males.

== Distribution ==
This species is endemic to New Zealand, like its host species, the New Zealand Glowworm.
