= Idiotypa =

Scientific classification
- Domain: Eukaryota
- Kingdom: Animalia
- Phylum: Arthropoda
- Class: Insecta
- Order: Hymenoptera
- Family: Diapriidae
- Subfamily: Diapriinae
- Tribe: Spilomicrini
- Genus: Idiotypa; Förster, 1856

Genus of insects

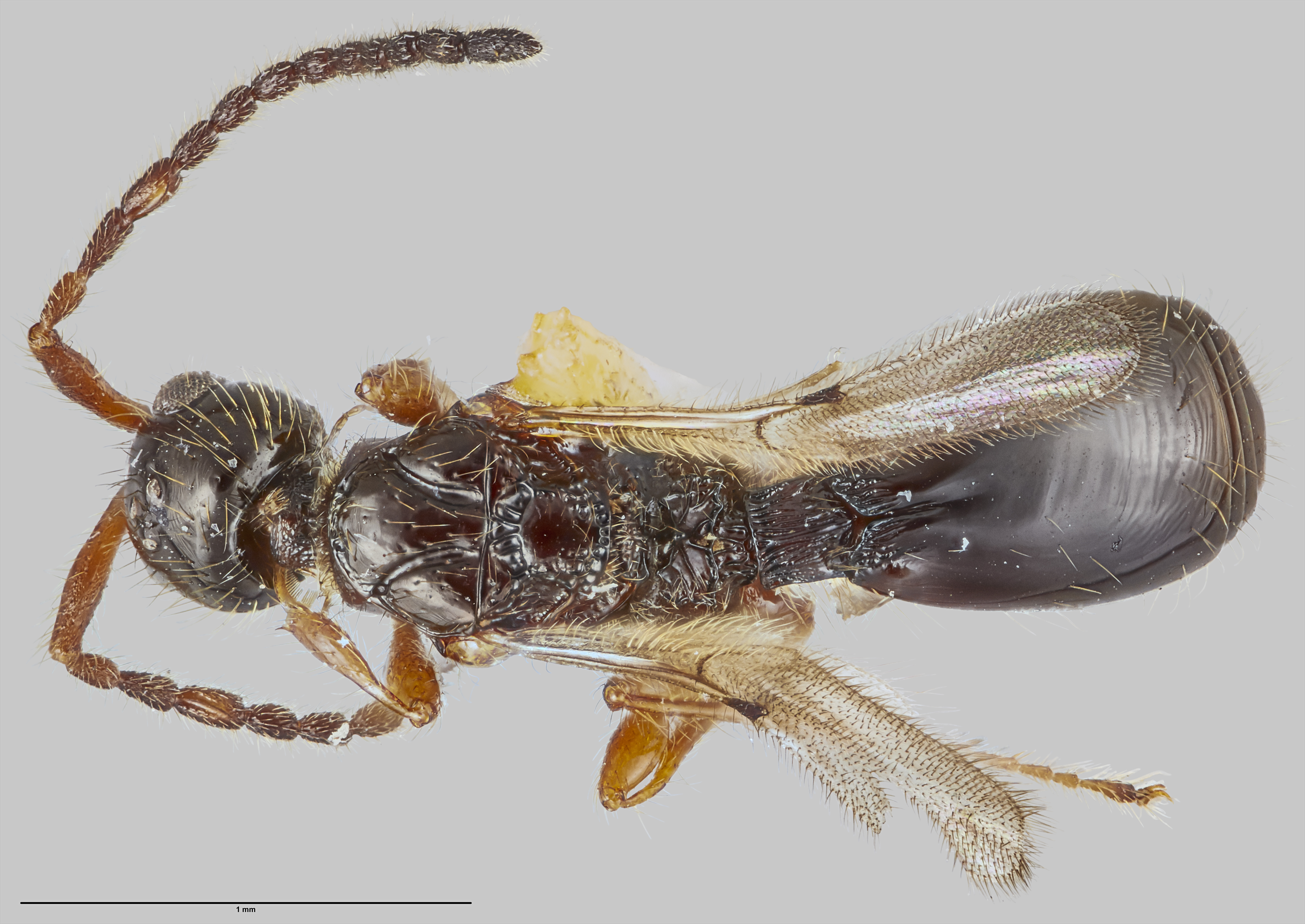
Idiotypa Foerster, 1856.

Idiotypa is a genus of wasps belonging to the family Diapriidae.

The genus has almost cosmopolitan distribution.

Species:

- Idiotypa marii Gregor, 1939
- Idiotypa maritima (Haliday, 1833)
- Idiotypa nigriceps Kieffer, 1909
- Idiotypa pallida Ashmead, 1894
- Idiotypa rufiventris (Thomson, 1858)
