= Parabetyla ngarara =

Scientific classification
- Kingdom: Animalia
- Phylum: Arthropoda
- Clade: Pancrustacea
- Class: Insecta
- Order: Hymenoptera
- Family: Diapriidae
- Genus: Parabetyla
- Species: P. ngarara

Binomial name
- Parabetyla ngarara Naumann, 1988

Species of parasitic wasp

Parabetyla ngarara is a species of diapriid wasp, and was first described in 1988 by the Australian entomologist, Ian D. Naumann. As described in the original publication the species epithet, ngarara is a Māori word meaning "monster". The female holotype of Parabetyla ngarara was collected from Nelson area, specifically in Canaan, New Zealand, in leaf litter. The holotype is housed in New Zealand Arthropod Collection.

This wasp is endemic to New Zealand, and like all Diapriidae is parasitic.

== Conservation status ==
This species is considered data deficient according the NZTCS.
