= Pantolytomyia flocculosa =

Scientific classification
- Kingdom: Animalia
- Phylum: Arthropoda
- Class: Insecta
- Order: Hymenoptera
- Family: Diapriidae
- Genus: Pantolytomyia
- Species: P. flocculosa

Binomial name
- Pantolytomyia flocculosa Naumann, 1988

Species of parasitic wasp

Pantolytomyia flocculosa is a species of diapriid wasp, and was first described in 1988 by the Australian entomologist, Ian D. Naumann. The species epithet, flocculosa (Latin floccus, `a tuft of wool') "refers to the matted tuft of setae on the frons".

This wasp is endemic to New Zealand, and like all Diapriidae is parasitic.

Type specimens were collected from moss, litter, and lichens, by diurnal or nocturnal sweeping of ferns, moss, and ground-cover,and by light trapping; in broadleaf forests (Agathis forest, Nothofagus forests, at altitudes of between 20 m and 1400 m.
