= Betyla midas =

Conservation status
- Data Deficient (NZ TCS)

Scientific classification
- Kingdom: Animalia
- Phylum: Arthropoda
- Class: Insecta
- Order: Hymenoptera
- Family: Diapriidae
- Genus: Betyla
- Species: B. midas

Binomial name
- Betyla midas Naumann, 1988

Species of wasp

Betyla midas is a species of diapriid wasp found in New Zealand.

This species was first described in 1988 by Ian D. Naumann, from female specimens and a single male. The species epithet, midas refers to King Midas because of "the golden pubescence of T2".

Its colour is largely an orange-yellow.

This wasp is endemic to New Zealand, and under the New Zealand Threat Classification System it has been declared "Data Deficient".
