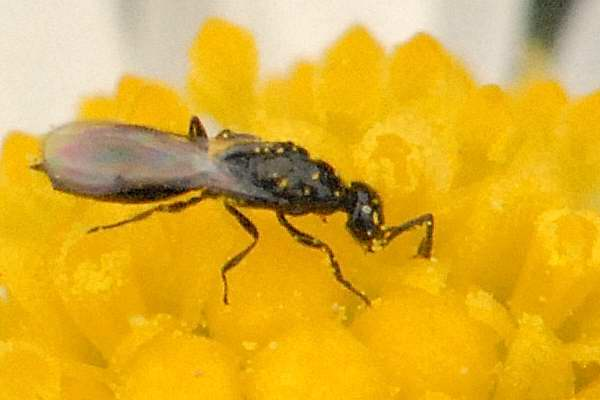
- Paramesius bifoveatus

Scientific classification
- Kingdom: Animalia
- Phylum: Arthropoda
- Class: Insecta
- Order: Hymenoptera
- Family: Diapriidae
- Subfamily: Diapriinae
- Tribe: Spilomicrini
- Genus: Paramesius; Westwood, 1832

= Paramesius =

Genus of wasps

Paramesius is a genus of hymenopterans in the family Diapriidae.

== North American Species ==
- Paramesius angustipennis Kieffer, 1911^{g}
- Paramesius belytoides Marshall, 1867^{g}
- Paramesius bifoveatus Kieffer, 1911^{g}
- Paramesius brachypterus Thomson, 1858^{g}
- Paramesius brevipennis Kieffer, 1911^{g}
- Paramesius cameroni Kieffer, 1911^{g}
- Paramesius claviscapus Thomson, 1858^{g}
- Paramesius crassicornis Thomson, 1858^{g}
- Paramesius dolichocerus Kieffer, 1911^{g}
- Paramesius dolosus Kieffer, 1911^{g}
- Paramesius inermis Kieffer, 1910^{g}
- Paramesius macrocerus Kieffer, 1911^{g}
- Paramesius nervosus (Nees, 1834)^{g}
- Paramesius pedestris Kieffer, 1911^{g}
- Paramesius rufipes (Boyer de Fonscolombe, 1832)^{g}
- Paramesius spiniger Kieffer, 1910^{g}
- Paramesius tenuicornis Thomson, 1858^{g}
- Paramesius westwoodi Fergusson, 1977^{g}

Data sources: i = ITIS, c = Catalogue of Life, g = GBIF, b = Bugguide.net
