= Pantolytomyia insularis =

Scientific classification
- Kingdom: Animalia
- Phylum: Arthropoda
- Class: Insecta
- Order: Hymenoptera
- Family: Diapriidae
- Genus: Pantolytomyia
- Species: P. insularis

Binomial name
- Pantolytomyia insularis Naumann, 1988

Species of parasitic wasp

Pantolytomyia insularis is a species of diapriid wasp, and was first described in 1988 by the Australian entomologist, Ian D. Naumann.

This wasp is endemic to New Zealand, and like all Diapriidae is parasitic.

The type specimens were collected from litter on Big South Cape Island, Codfish Island, and Ulva Island. (Hence the species epithet, insularis from the Latin insula ("island"), referring to the type locality).
