= Parabetyla pipira =

Scientific classification
- Domain: Eukaryota
- Kingdom: Animalia
- Phylum: Arthropoda
- Class: Insecta
- Order: Hymenoptera
- Family: Diapriidae
- Genus: Parabetyla
- Species: P. pipira

Binomial name
- Parabetyla pipira Naumann, 1988

Species of parasitic wasp

Parabetyla pipira is a species of diapriid wasp, and was first described in 1988 by the Australian entomologist, Ian D. Naumann. The species epithet, pipiri (Māori "to cling together"), 'refers to the mutual proximity of the propodeal spines'. The specimens described were female only and were collected from moss and litter at altitudes between 427 m and 1250 m.

This wasp is endemic to New Zealand, and like all Diapriidae is parasitic.
