= Parabetyla spinosa =

Scientific classification
- Kingdom: Animalia
- Phylum: Arthropoda
- Class: Insecta
- Order: Hymenoptera
- Family: Diapriidae
- Genus: Parabetyla
- Species: P. spinosa

Binomial name
- Parabetyla spinosa Brues, 1922

Species of wasp

Parabetyla spinosa is a species of diapriid wasp, and was first described in 1922 by the American entomologist, Charles Thomas Brues.

This wasp is endemic to New Zealand, and like all Diapriidae is parasitic.

== Description ==
Brues describes the females of this genus as:

Length 3.3 mm. Entirely rufo-ferruginous, the abdomen and antenne slightly paler. Head, seen from above,one-third longer than wide, including the frontal projection; widest at the eyes which are near the middle, obliquely narrowed anteriorly to the base of the antennal projection, rounded behind, the occipital margin strongly and conspicuously carinate. Head seen from the side sub-triangular, the face long, straight; front above highly convex; eyes their own diameter from the frontal projection and three times as far from the mandibles; entire surface smooth and shining. Antennal scape as long as the head, thickest basally, as long as the seven following joints together; pedicel twice as long as thick, slightly longer and stouter than the first flagellar joint; three following of equal length, becoming moniliform; fifth, sixth and seventh larger; beyond this the joints become large, forming a very gradual but stout club, of which the joints except the last are barely wider than long. Pronotum slightly projecting at its humeral angles, twice as long as the mesonotum at the sides; the mesonotum separated by a deep grooved line, no longer than the portion of the pronotum visible medially; scutellum large, as broad as the mesonotum, the basal suture not impressed nor foveate. Propodeum very short, twice as high as long, its spines curve backwards, with the median one set somewhat forward of the lateral ones. Pro-and mesopleurae smooth and polished; metapleura and sides of propodeum rugose, with several more or less regular oblique carinze extending downwards and backwards. Petiole finely longitudinally rugose- striate, narrower at base and apex. Gaster about three times as broad as the head or thorax. The hairs on the body are denser on the petiole, propodeum and base of abdomen, and entirely absent on the pro- and mesopleure. Tarsal claws stout, simple; tibial spurs minute; hairs on femora very sparse, those of the tibize conspicuous.

Naumann (1988) gives a later description of the species, which includes a description of the males, expands the description of the females, and differentiates it from Naumann's newly described species in the genus.
