= Parabetyla pokorua =

Scientific classification
- Kingdom: Animalia
- Phylum: Arthropoda
- Class: Insecta
- Order: Hymenoptera
- Family: Diapriidae
- Genus: Parabetyla
- Species: P. pokorua

Binomial name
- Parabetyla pokorua Naumann, 1988

Species of parasitic wasp

Parabetyla pokorua is a species of diapriid wasp, and was first described in 1988 by the Australian entomologist, Ian D. Naumann. The species epithet, pokorua (Maori, `ant') "refers to the ant-like appearance of the female." The type specimens were collected at Jackson River, Gilbert Island, by sweeping leaf litter in Nothofagus menziesii forest; at altitudes between 30 m and 670 m.

This wasp is endemic to New Zealand, and like all Diapriidae is parasitic.
