= Betyla eupepla =

Scientific classification
- Kingdom: Animalia
- Phylum: Arthropoda
- Clade: Pancrustacea
- Class: Insecta
- Order: Hymenoptera
- Family: Diapriidae
- Genus: Betyla
- Species: B. eupepla

Binomial name
- Betyla eupepla Naumann, 1988

Species of wasp

Betyla eupepla is a species of diapriid wasp found in New Zealand.

This species was first described in 1988 by Ian D. Naumann, from both male (151) and female specimens (162). The species epithet, eupepla comes from Greek meaning "well-clothed", and refers to the pubescence on parts of the female.

This species is endemic to New Zealand. where it is found on both North and South Islands.
