= Betyla auriger =

Scientific classification
- Kingdom: Animalia
- Phylum: Arthropoda
- Clade: Pancrustacea
- Class: Insecta
- Order: Hymenoptera
- Family: Diapriidae
- Genus: Betyla
- Species: B. auriger

Binomial name
- Betyla auriger Naumann, 1988

Species of wasp

Betyla auriga is a species of diapriid wasp found in New Zealand.

This species was first described in 1988 by Ian D. Naumann, from female specimens only. The species epithet, auriger (Latin- "gold-bearing") refers to the 'golden setae of the female'.

This species is endemic to New Zealand, where it is found in the north of the South Island.
