= Parabetyla tika =

Scientific classification
- Domain: Eukaryota
- Kingdom: Animalia
- Phylum: Arthropoda
- Class: Insecta
- Order: Hymenoptera
- Family: Diapriidae
- Genus: Parabetyla
- Species: P. tika

Binomial name
- Parabetyla tika Naumann, 1988

Species of parasitic wasp

Parabetyla tika is a species of diapriid wasp, and was first described in 1988 by the Australian entomologist, Ian D. Naumann. The species epithet, tika is a Māori word meaning "correct/perfect". The specimens described were both male and female and were collected on both the North and South Islands from 'litter, moss, and low vegetation in and at (the) margins of Dracophyllum, Nothofagus, podocarp /broad-leaf, and punga / broadleaf forests, Fuchsia/Weinmannia bush, and from coastal forest at altitudes between 20 m and 1180 m'.

This wasp is endemic to New Zealand, and like all Diapriidae is parasitic.
