= Parabetyla nauhea =

Scientific classification
- Kingdom: Animalia
- Phylum: Arthropoda
- Class: Insecta
- Order: Hymenoptera
- Family: Diapriidae
- Genus: Parabetyla
- Species: P. nauhea

Binomial name
- Parabetyla nauhea Naumann, 1988

Species of parasitic wasp

Parabetyla nauhea is a species of diapriid wasp, and was first described in 1988 by the Australian entomologist, Ian D. Naumann. The species epithet, nauhea is a Māori word meaning "rascal". The type specimens (female only) were collected on both the North & South Islands from moss and ferns in Nothofagus menziesii and podocarp broadleaf forests, at altitudes of between 20 m and 1250 m.

This wasp is endemic to New Zealand, and like all Diapriidae is parasitic.
