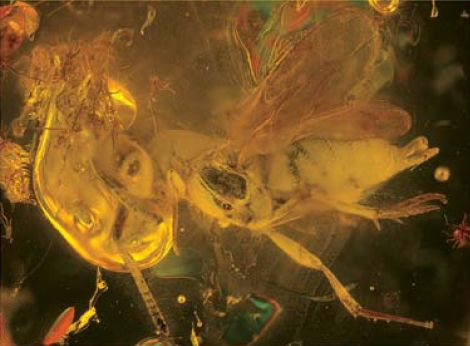
- Neanaperiallus masneri holotype

Scientific classification
- Kingdom: Animalia
- Phylum: Arthropoda
- Clade: Pancrustacea
- Class: Insecta
- Order: Hymenoptera
- Family: Eupelmidae
- Genus: †Neanaperiallus; Gibson, 2009
- Species: †N. masneri

Binomial name
- †Neanaperiallus masneri Gibson, 2009

= Neanaperiallus =

Neanaperiallus Temporal range: Early Eocene

Extinct genus of insects

Neanaperiallus is an extinct monotypic genus of parasitic wasp in the Eupelmidae subfamily Neanastatinae containing only a single species, Neanaperiallus masneri. The genus is solely known from the Early Eocene Baltic amber deposits in the Baltic Sea region of Europe.

== History and classification ==
Neanaperiallus masneri is known only from one fossil, the holotype, number "AMNH B-JWJ-265", which is a single female specimen preserved in a nearly round amber block shaped with five unequal sides. The block is currently residing in the American Museum of Natural History paleoentomology collections in New York City, USA. N. masneri was first studied by Gary A. P. Gibson, with his 2009 type description being published in the journal ZooKeys. The generic name was coined by Gary Gibson as a combination of the Ancient Greek word periallos, meaning "before all others", and from "neana" from the subfamily name Neanastatinae. This is in reference to the possible relationship of Neanaperiallus to the other genera in Neanastatinae. The specific epithet "masneri" was designated by Gary Gibson in honor of Lubomír Masner in recognition of his many contributions to the study of parasitic wasps.

== Description ==
Neanaperiallus masneri is 3.3 millimetres (0.13 in) in length when the ovipositor is included. The general coloration is a yellow tone, but it is possible the species may have in fact been a uniform brown based on clear views of the acropleuron and several of the abdomen tergites. Much of the female is obscured, with a coating of white mold covering the entire right side of the specimen. Much of the face is obscured by a large air bubble and numerous tiny bubbles reduce the clarity of the amber. Though the forewings are uniformly hyaline in coloration the right wing still obscures the top of much of the gaster and metanotum. Basally the forewings are setose whereas the costal cell is setose along the front edge only. Beyond the parastigma the setae grow sparse and the wing apex is apparently bare.

The mesosoma is short and stocky in comparison to the other genera which are placed in the Neanastatinae subfamily and many member genera of Eupelmidae overall. Similarly N. masneri has notably short antennae and middle legs. In general dorsal appearance the genus is very similar to males of the subfamily Eupelminae and the family Pteromalidae. Gary Gibson notes that many features of the species are not describable from the single known specimen, and that more complete specimens are needed to fully describe the species. Because of the shape and short length of the ovipositor sheath Gibson postulates that Neanaperiallus masneri was parasitic on hosts which were exposed or near the surface of wood or other substrates.
