= Acanthopsilus =

Scientific classification
- Kingdom: Animalia
- Phylum: Arthropoda
- Clade: Pancrustacea
- Class: Insecta
- Order: Hymenoptera
- Family: Diapriidae
- Subfamily: Belytinae
- Genus: Acanthopsilus; Kieffer, 1908

Genus of wasps

Acanthopsilus is a genus of wasps belonging to the family Diapriidae.

Species:

- Acanthopsilus marshalli (Kieffer, 1907)
- Acanthopsilus zangherii Szabo, 1959
