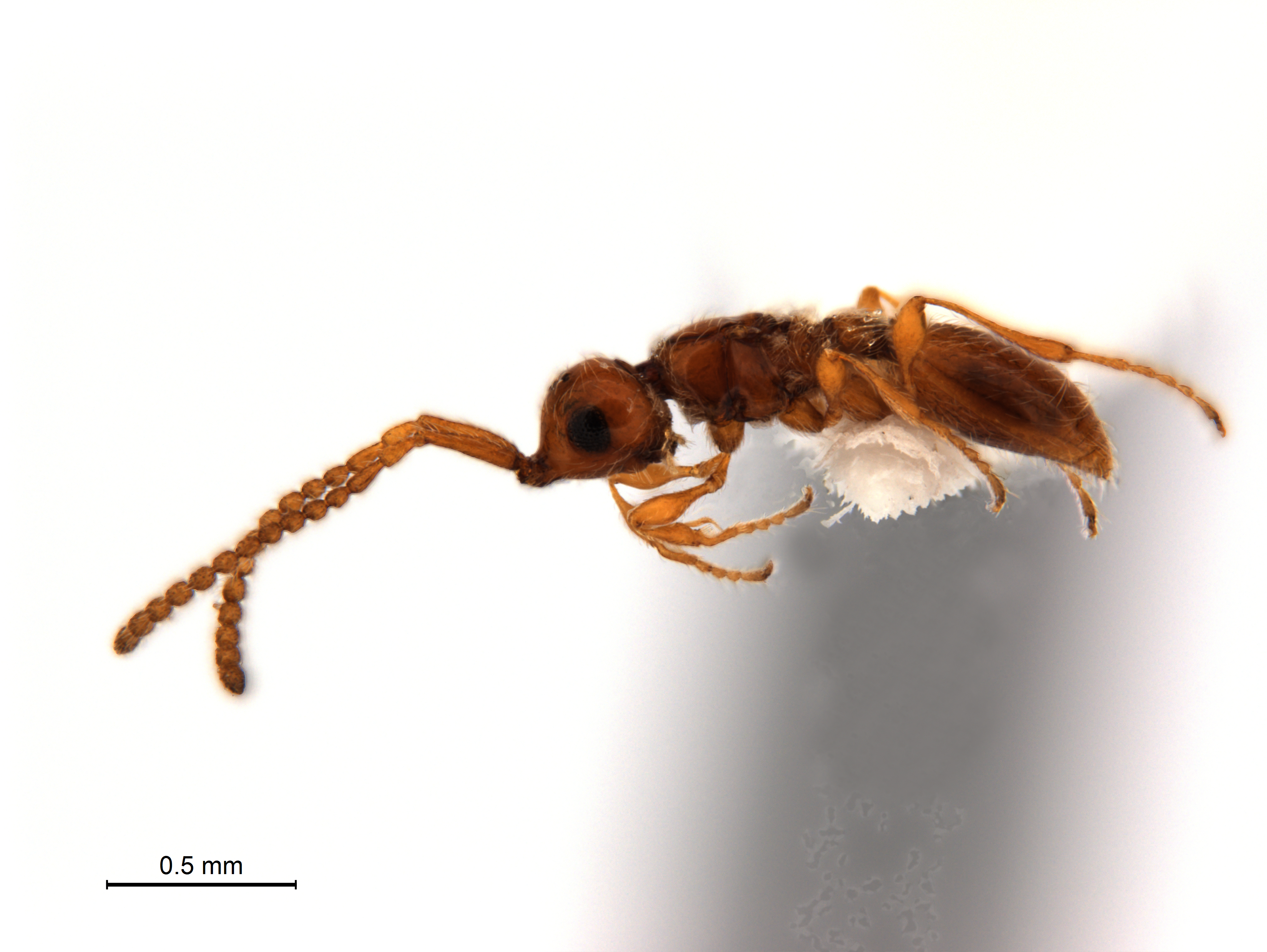
- Maoripria earlyi

Scientific classification
- Kingdom: Animalia
- Phylum: Arthropoda
- Class: Insecta
- Order: Hymenoptera
- Family: Diapriidae
- Subfamily: Ambositrinae
- Genus: Maoripria; Naumann, 1988

= Maoripria =

Species of gastropod

Maoripria is a genus of parasitoid wasps in the family Diapriidae. All four species are endemic to New Zealand, and were described in a paper by Australian entomologist Ian D. Naumann in 1988.

== Species ==
Species within the genus Maoripria include:

- Maoripria annettae (Naumann, 1988)
- Maoripria earlyi (Naumann, 1988)
- Maoripria masneri (Naumann, 1988)
- Maoripria verticillata (Naumann, 1988)
