= Iberopria =

Scientific classification
- Kingdom: Animalia
- Phylum: Arthropoda
- Class: Insecta
- Order: Hymenoptera
- Family: Diapriidae
- Genus: †Iberopria; Engel, Ortega-Blanco & Martinez-Delclos, in Engel, Ortega-Blanco, Soriano, Grimaldi & Martinez-Delclos, 2013

Extinct genus of wasps

Iberopria is an extinct genus of wasp currently comprising a single species Iberopria perialla.
