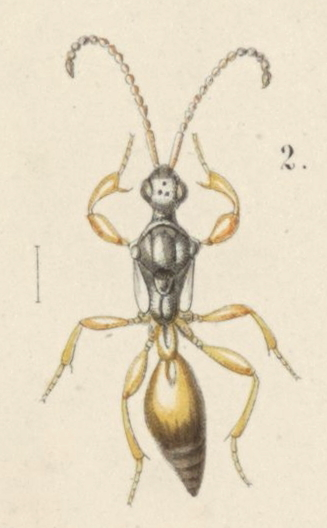
- Female Belyta sanguinolenta

Scientific classification
- Kingdom: Animalia
- Phylum: Arthropoda
- Class: Insecta
- Order: Hymenoptera
- Family: Diapriidae
- Subfamily: Belytinae
- Genus: Belyta; Jurine

Species
- Several, including: Belyta elegans Kieffer, 1909

= Belyta =

Genus of wasps

Belyta is a genus of diapriid wasps.

== Gallery ==
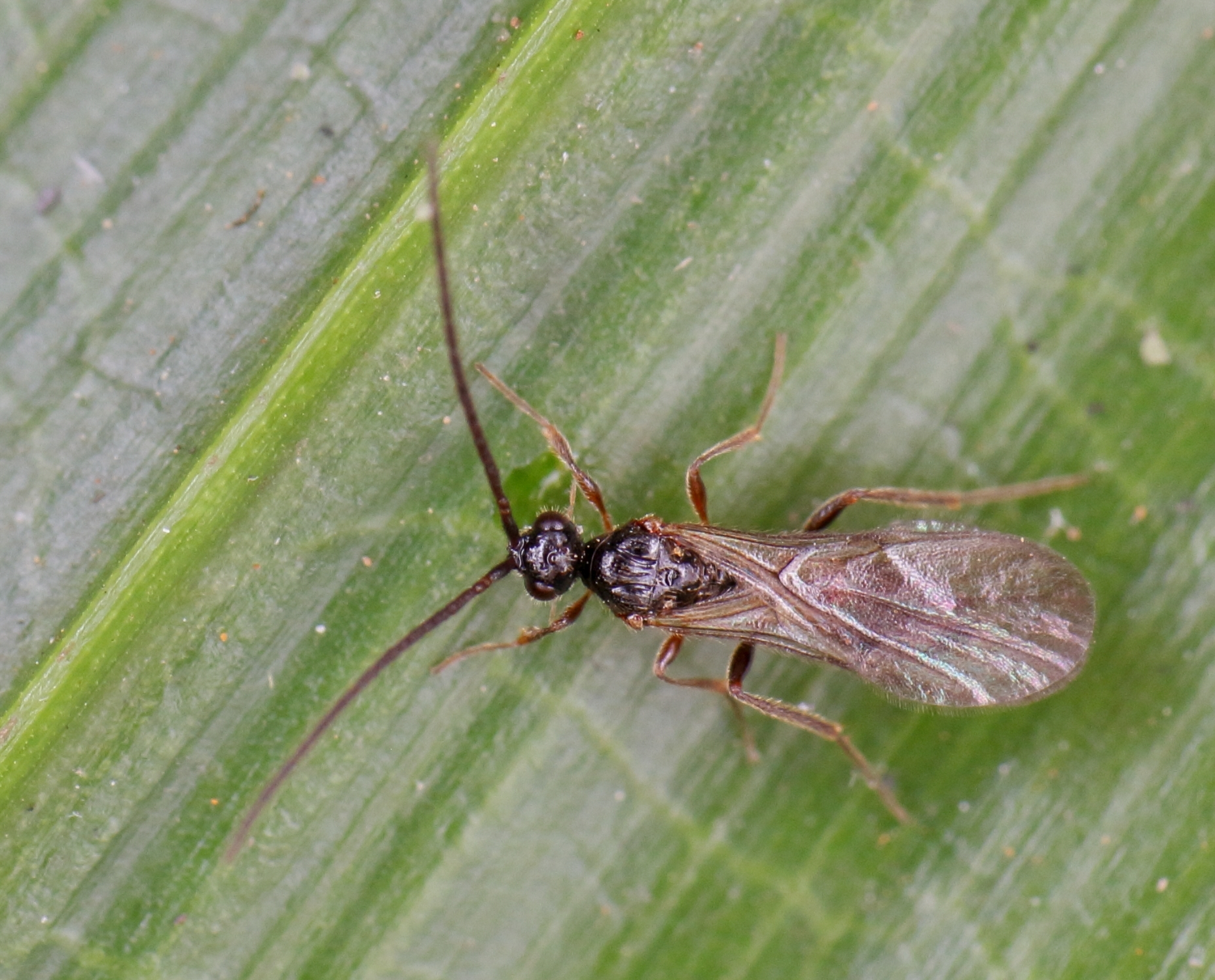
Male Belyta sp.

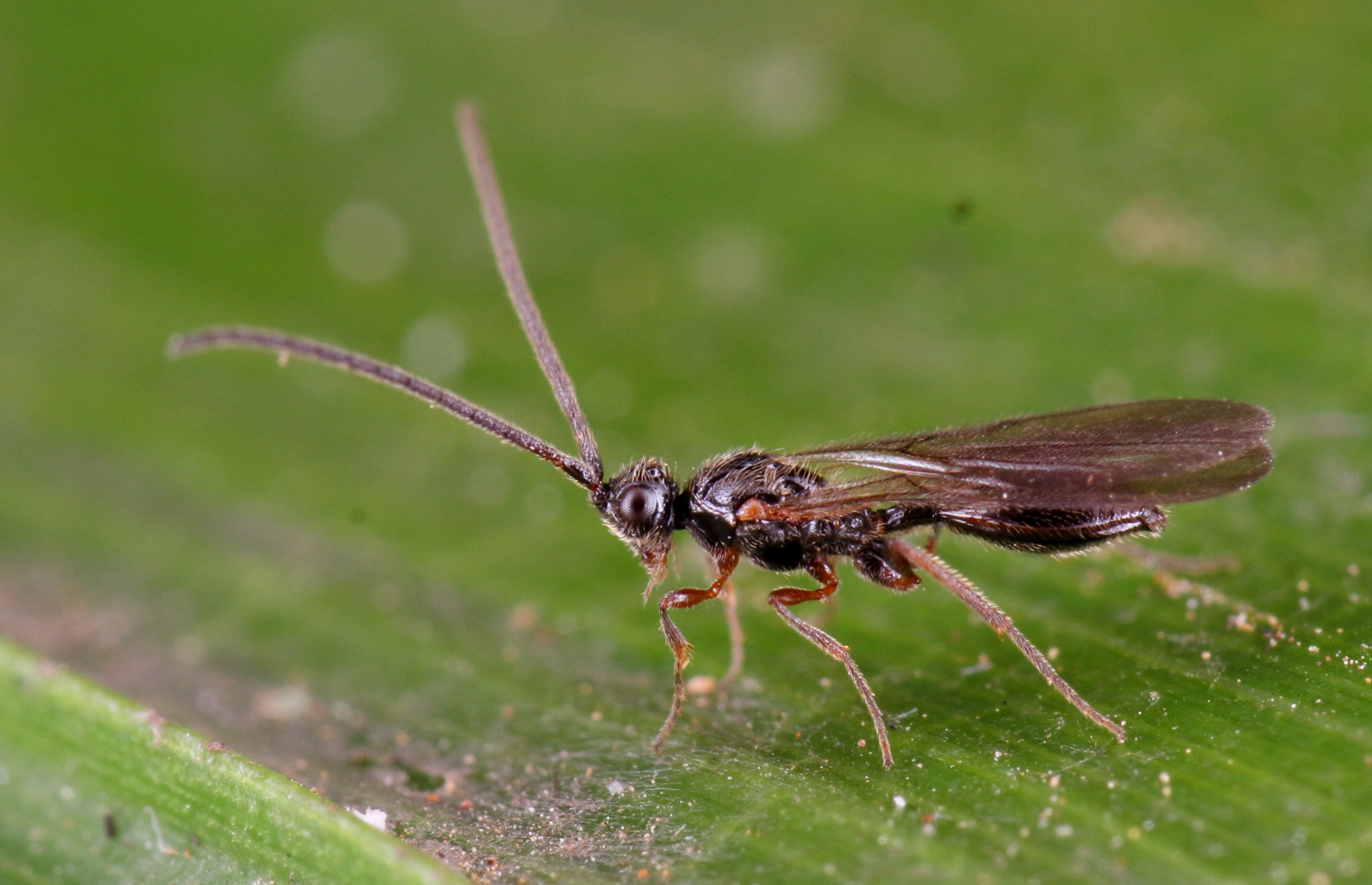
Male Belyta sp.

== See also ==
- List of diapriid genera
