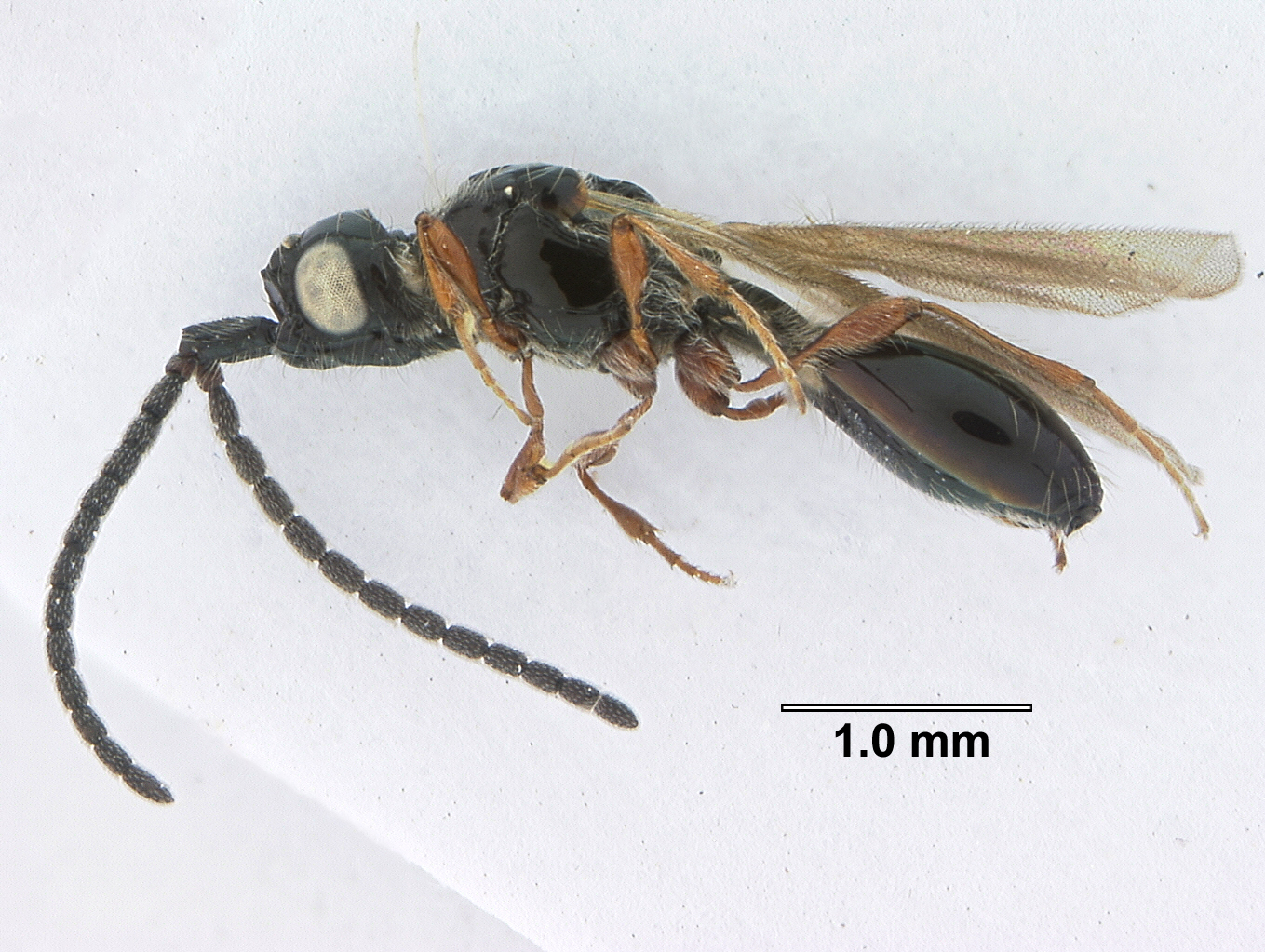

Scientific classification
- Domain: Eukaryota
- Kingdom: Animalia
- Phylum: Arthropoda
- Class: Insecta
- Order: Hymenoptera
- Family: Diapriidae
- Subfamily: Diapriinae
- Tribe: Psilini
- Genus: Coptera; Say, 1836

= Coptera =

Genus of wasps

Coptera is a genus of wasps belonging to the family Diapriidae.

They are a genus of parasitic wasps. Coptera females search for hosts. The known hosts are primarily true fruit flies.

This genus is found in Southeast Asia, Europe, Central and Southern Africa, and North and South America.

== Species ==
Species include:

- Coptera acantha Montilla & García, 2016
- Coptera alticeps (Kieffer, 1911)
- Coptera angulata Muesebeck, 1980
- Coptera anka Krogmann, et al., 2018
- Coptera ateles Montilla & García, 2016
- Coptera campanada Montilla & García, 2016
- Coptera cingulatae
- Coptera crassicornis (Kieffer, 1911)
- Coptera tonic Ericson & Forbes, 2020
