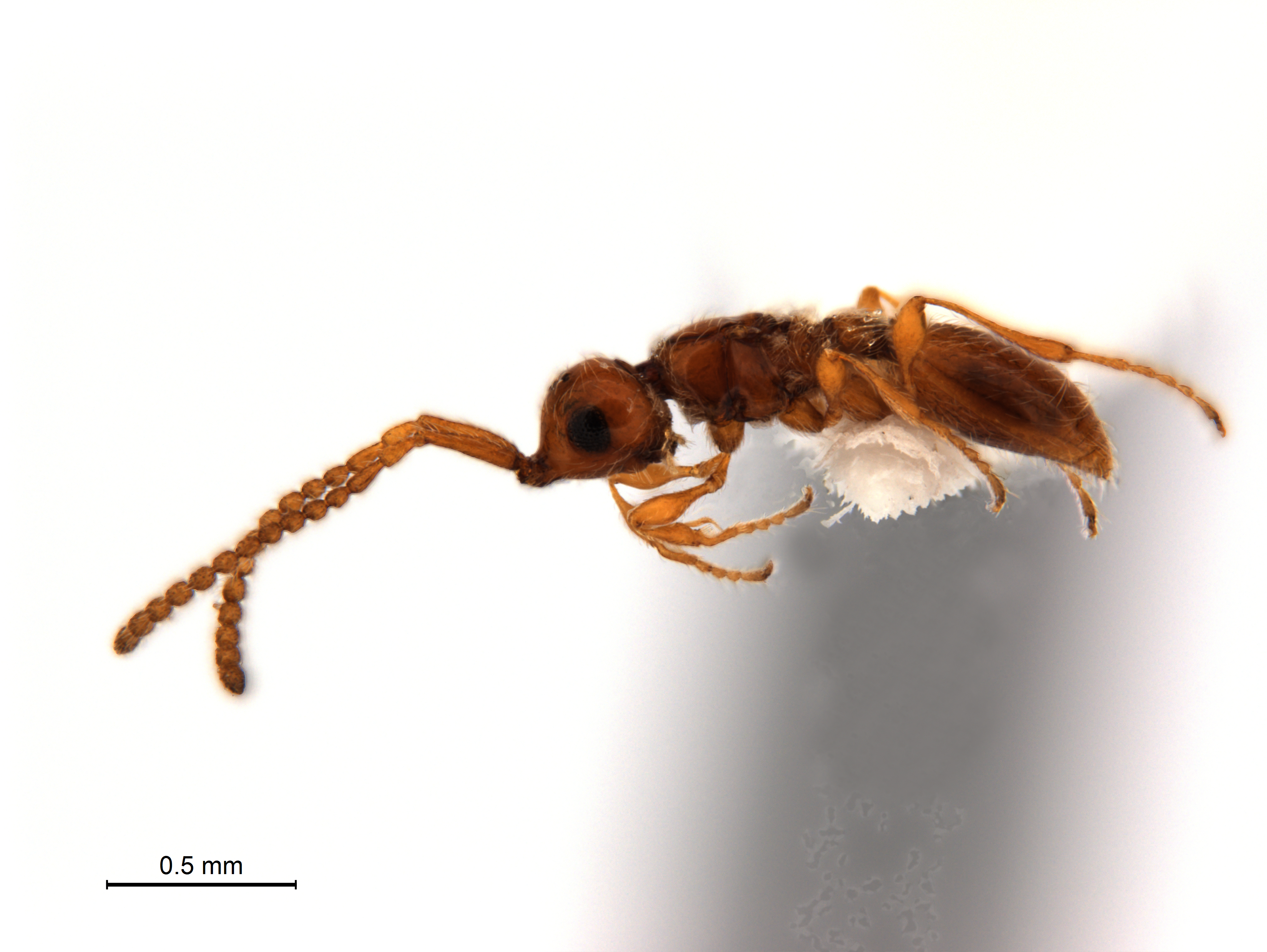
- Specimen from the Auckland War Memorial Museum

Scientific classification
- Domain: Eukaryota
- Kingdom: Animalia
- Phylum: Arthropoda
- Class: Insecta
- Order: Hymenoptera
- Family: Diapriidae
- Genus: Maoripria
- Species: M. earlyi

Binomial name
- Maoripria earlyi (Naumann, 1988)

= Maoripria earlyi =

Species of parasitoid wasp

Maoripria earlyi is a species of parasitoid wasps in the family Diapriidae. It was first described by Australian entomologist Ian D. Naumann in 1988.

== Description ==
Maoripria earlyi measure between 1.5mm and 2.9mm in length, with males tending to be smaller, and are reddish orange to yellow in colour. The wings of both sexes are minute and lack veins.

== Etymology ==
The species was named after New Zealand entomologist John W. Early, who identified many of the early type specimens.

== Distribution ==
The species is endemic to New Zealand. Many specimens have been collected from fern and moss found in podocarp forests of the lower North and South Islands, including Fiordland National Park, Mount Aspiring National Park, Ruahine Forest Park and the Tararua Ranges.
