= Gwaihiria =

Scientific classification
- Kingdom: Animalia
- Phylum: Arthropoda
- Class: Insecta
- Order: Hymenoptera
- Family: Diapriidae
- Subfamily: Ambositrinae
- Genus: Gwaihiria; Naumann, 1982

Genus of wasps

Gwaihiria is a genus of wasps belonging to the family Diapriidae.

== Species ==
- Gwaihiria allocerata Naumann, 1982
- Gwaihiria bifoveata (Dodd, 1916)
