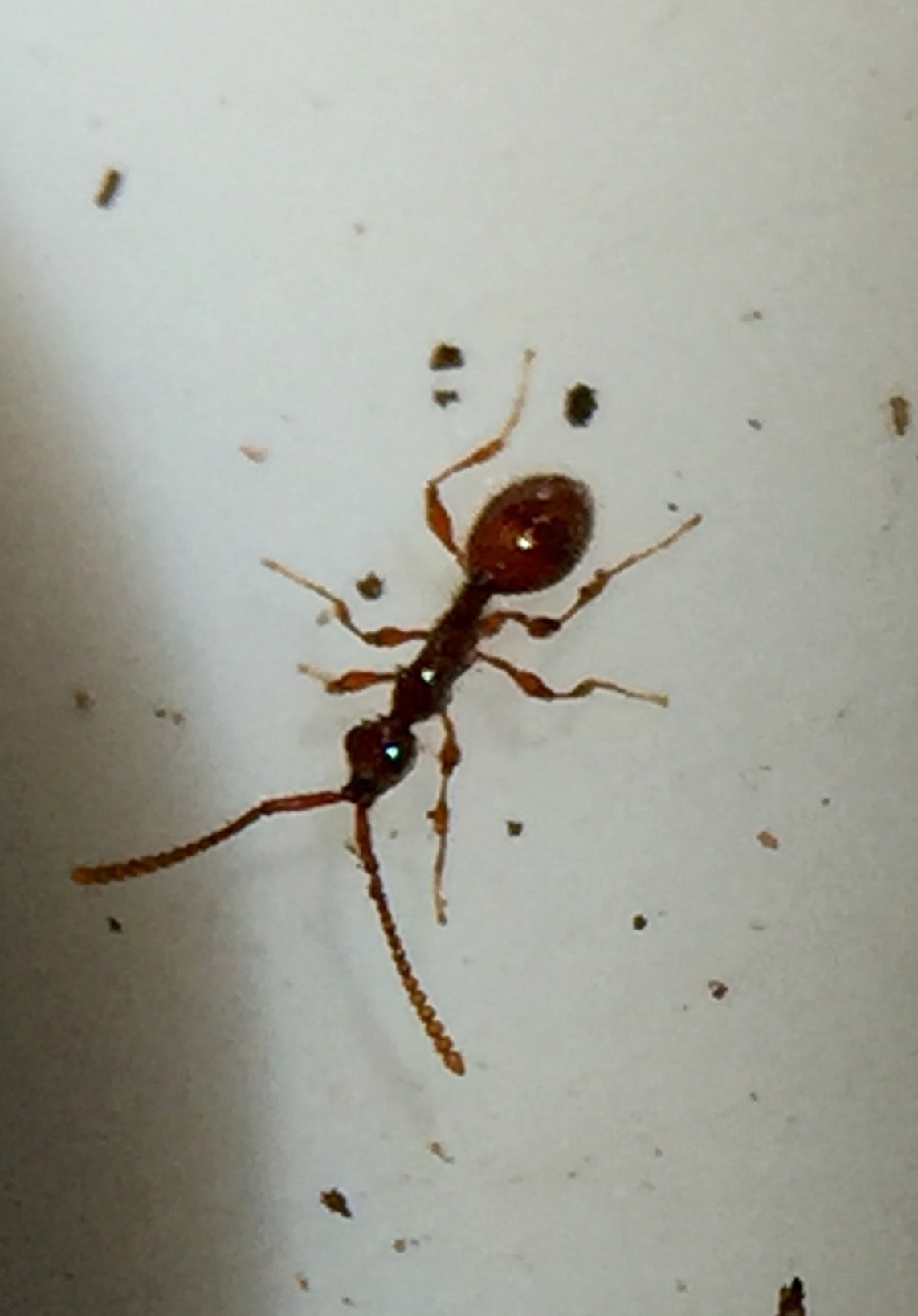
- Image of B. fulva by Stephen E. Thorpe

Scientific classification
- Kingdom: Animalia
- Phylum: Arthropoda
- Class: Insecta
- Order: Hymenoptera
- Family: Diapriidae
- Genus: Betyla; Cameron, 1889

= Betyla =

Genus of wasps

Betyla is a genus of wasps belonging to the family Diapriidae.

== Taxonomy ==
The genus was first described by Peter Cameron in 1889, and is endemic to New Zealand. The type species is Betyla fulva.

== Species ==
Species listed as accepted by IRMNG are:

- Betyla auriger Naumann, 1988
- Betyla eupepla Naumann, 1988
- Betyla fulva Cameron, 1889
- Betyla karamea Naumann, 1988
- Betyla midas Naumann, 1988
- Betyla paparoa Naumann, 1988
- Betyla prosedera Naumann, 1988
- Betyla rangatira Naumann, 1988
- Betyla thegalea Naumann, 1988
- Betyla tuatara Naumann, 1988
- Betyla wahine Naumann, 1988
