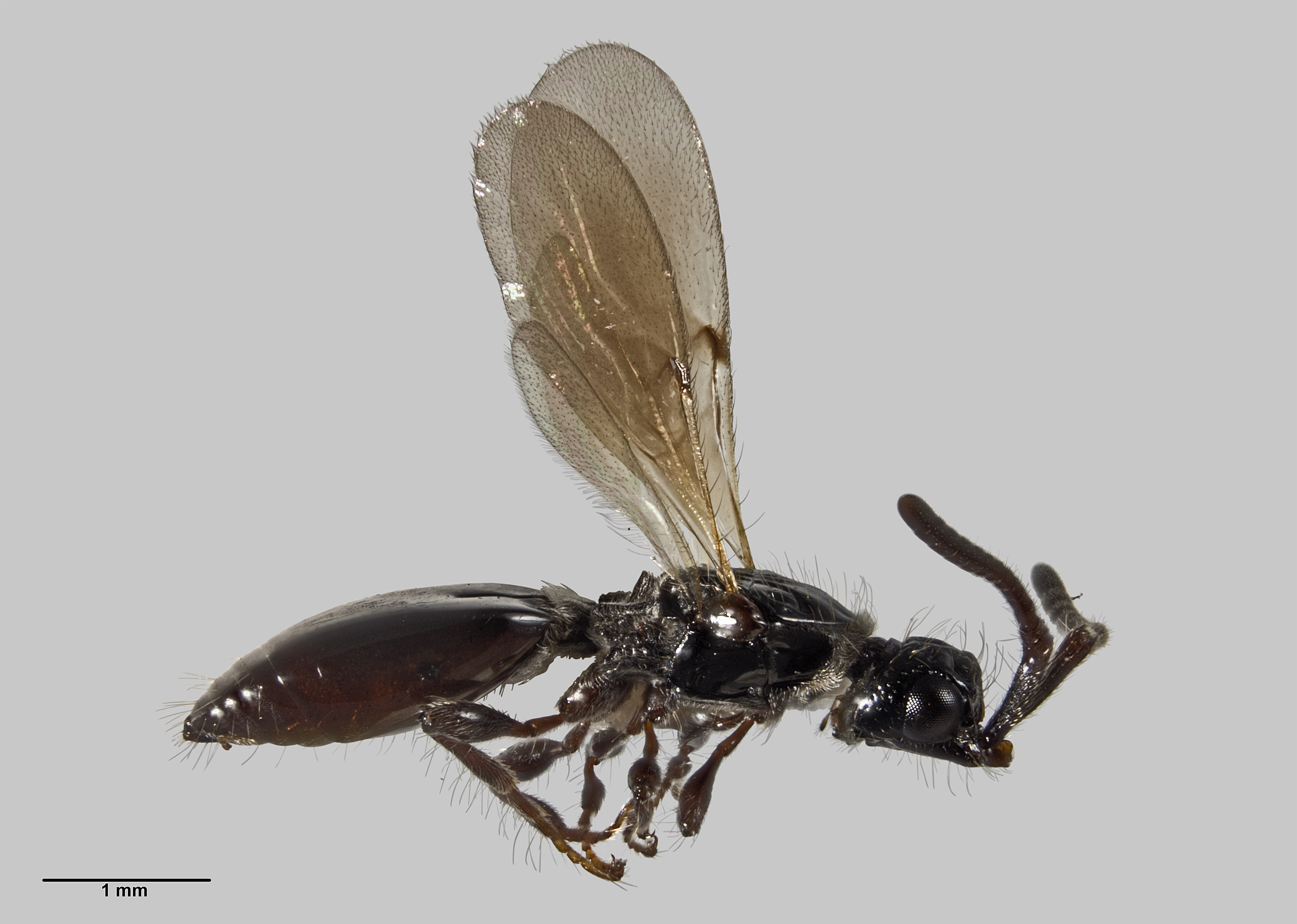
- Neurogalesus carinatus

Scientific classification
- Kingdom: Animalia
- Phylum: Arthropoda
- Class: Insecta
- Order: Hymenoptera
- Family: Diapriidae
- Tribe: Spilomicrini
- Genus: Neurogalesus; Kieffer, 1907

= Neurogalesus =

Genus of insects

Neurogalesus is a genus of parasitoid wasps.

== Species ==
- Neurogalesus carinatus
- Neurogalesus militis
