= Pantolytomyia =

Scientific classification
- Kingdom: Animalia
- Phylum: Arthropoda
- Class: Insecta
- Order: Hymenoptera
- Family: Diapriidae
- Genus: Pantolytomyia; Dodd, 1915

Genus of wasps

Pantolytomyia is a genus of diapriid wasps, and was first described in 1915 by the Australian entomologist, Alan Parkhurst Dodd.

== Species ==
Species listed by GBIF are:

1. Pantolytomyia insularis Naumann, 1988
2. Pantolytomyia takere Naumann, 1988
3. Pantolytomyia flocculosa Naumann, 1988
4. Pantolytomyia tungane Naumann, 1988
5. Pantolytomyia polita Naumann, 1988
6. Pantolytomyia wairua Naumann, 1988
7. Pantolytomyia taurangi Naumann, 1988

== See also ==
- List of diapriid genera
