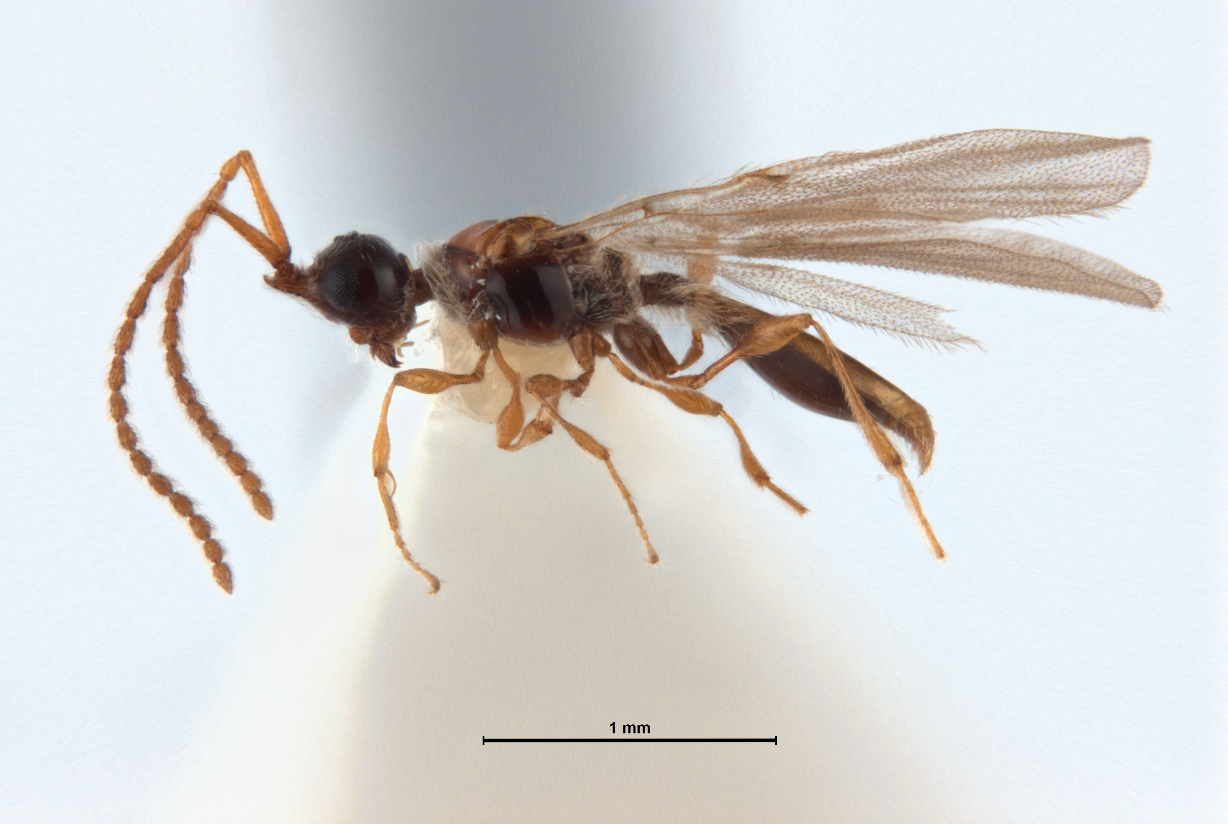
- A. pelor specimen AMNZ81967 collected in Waitewhena Forest on 2005-02-12

Scientific classification
- Kingdom: Animalia
- Phylum: Arthropoda
- Class: Insecta
- Order: Hymenoptera
- Family: Diapriidae
- Genus: Archaeopria; Naumann, 1988

= Archaeopria =

Genus of wasps

Archaeopria is a genus of parasitoid wasps belonging to the family Diapriidae.

The genus was first described in 1988 by Ian D. Naumann. The type species is Archaeopria eriodes.

All species in the genus are endemic to New Zealand.

== Species ==
Species accepted by IRMNG:

- Archaeopria eriodes Naumann, 1988
- Archaeopria pelor Naumann, 1988
- Archaeopria pristina Naumann, 1988
