= Parabetyla =

Scientific classification
- Kingdom: Animalia
- Phylum: Arthropoda
- Class: Insecta
- Order: Hymenoptera
- Family: Diapriidae
- Genus: Parabetyla; Brues

Genus of wasps

Parabetyla is a genus of diapriid wasps, and was first described in 1922 by the American entomologist, Charles Thomas Brues. The type species is Parabetyla spinosa.

Species in the genus are endemic to New Zealand, and like all Diapriidae are parasitic.

== Description ==
Brues describes the females of this genus as:

entirely wingless. Head, thorax and petiole narrow; gaster broad. Head with a very prominent frontal projection, longer than wide; eyes small, with a few long hairs; ocelli absent. Antenne 15-jointed, with a stout 6-jointed club. Maxillary palpi 5-jointed; basal joint minute; apical one much longer than the others. Thorax much elongated: pronotum medially half as long as at the sides; mesonotum small; scutellum without basal impressions, half as long as the mesonotum; propodeum separated by a constriction basally above; apically with three long thorn-like spines, one median and another at each side. Petiole twice as long as thick, without tooth below. Gaster large, elongate oval, composed almost entirely of the second segment. Legs stout, the femora very strongly clavate, but the tibiae not noticeably so. Body clothed with nearly erect sparse pale hairs.

Naumann (1988) gives a later description of the genus, which includes a description of males, where possible, and expands the description of the females.

== Species ==
Species listed by IRMNG are:

1. Parabetyla nauhea Naumann, 1988
2. Parabetyla ngarara Naumann, 1988
3. Parabetyla pipira Naumann, 1988
4. Parabetyla pokorua Naumann, 1988
5. Parabetyla spinosa Brues, 1922
6. Parabetyla tahi Naumann, 1988
7. Parabetyla tika Naumann, 1988

== See also ==
- List of diapriid genera
