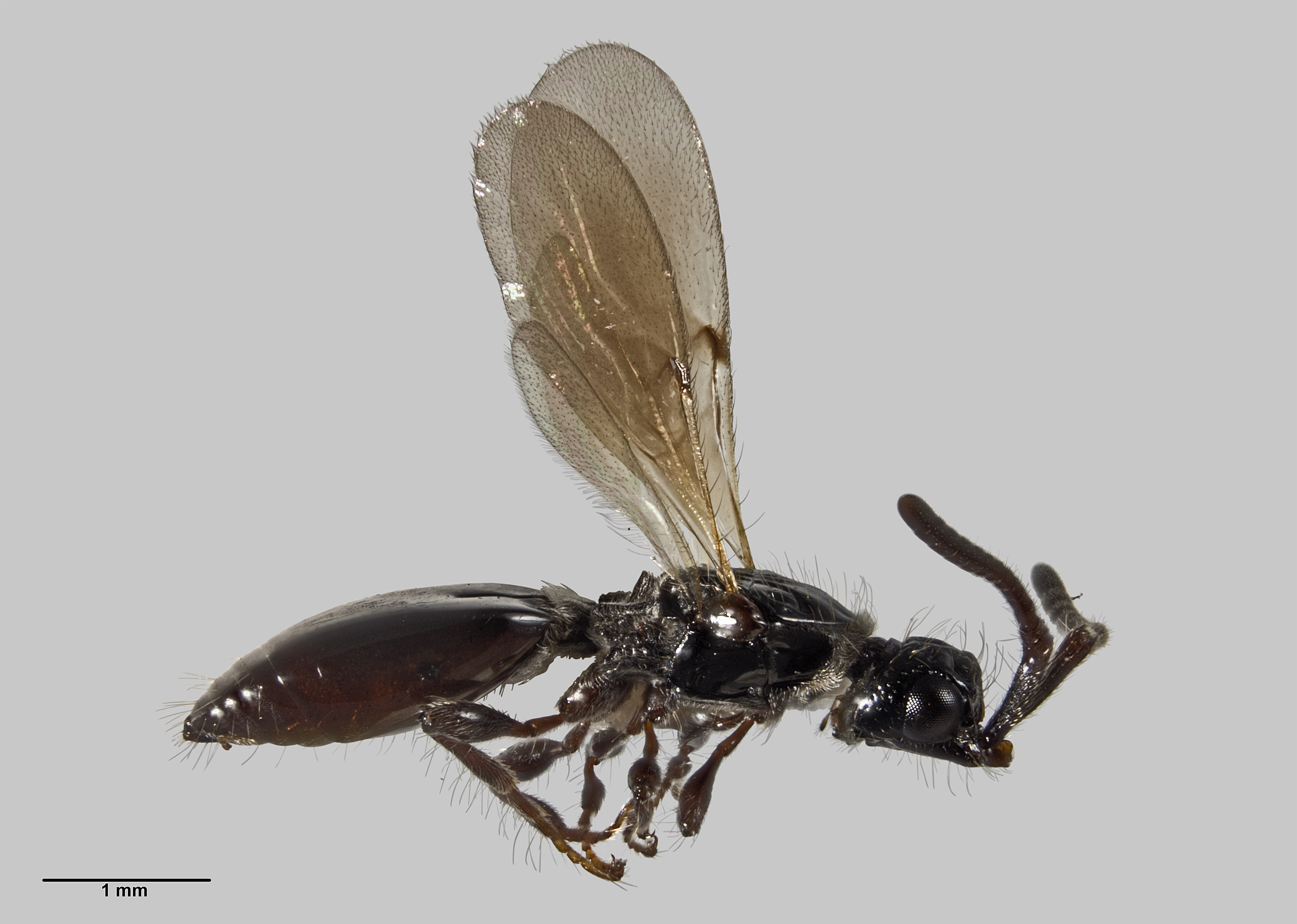
- Neurogalesus carinatus from New Zealand

Scientific classification
- Kingdom: Animalia
- Phylum: Arthropoda
- Clade: Pancrustacea
- Class: Insecta
- Order: Hymenoptera
- Family: Diapriidae
- Genus: Neurogalesus
- Species: N. carinatus

Binomial name
- Neurogalesus carinatus Kieffer, 1907

Synonyms
- Neurogalesus hackeri Dodd, 1915; Neurogalesus inopodos Osborn, 1974

= Neurogalesus carinatus =

Species of wasp

Neurogalesus carinatus is a species of parasitic wasp in the family Diapriidae, first described in 1907. It uses the Australian soldier fly Inopus rubriceps as a host, sharing its range in pastured areas of South East Queensland, northern New South Wales and its non-native range on the North Island of New Zealand.

== Description ==
Neurogalesus carinatus have deep red-coloured legs and antennae, with a female body length of up to 5.5mm. It can be distinguished from Neurogalesus dissimilis and Neurogalesus rubripes (two wasps with similar appearances) by having a sulcus on either side of the median groove at the base of the abdomen.

== Distribution ==
The earliest recorded sighting of Neurogalesus carinatus in New Zealand is in 1985, after a specimen was collected from Mangere in Auckland. As of 2014, no specimens have been collected from New Zealand native bush environments, suggesting that the fly exclusively lives in urban environments and pastures. No species of fly other than Inopus rubriceps present in New Zealand are known to act as hosts for Neurogalesus carinatus.
