= Lubomír Masner =

Czech entomologist

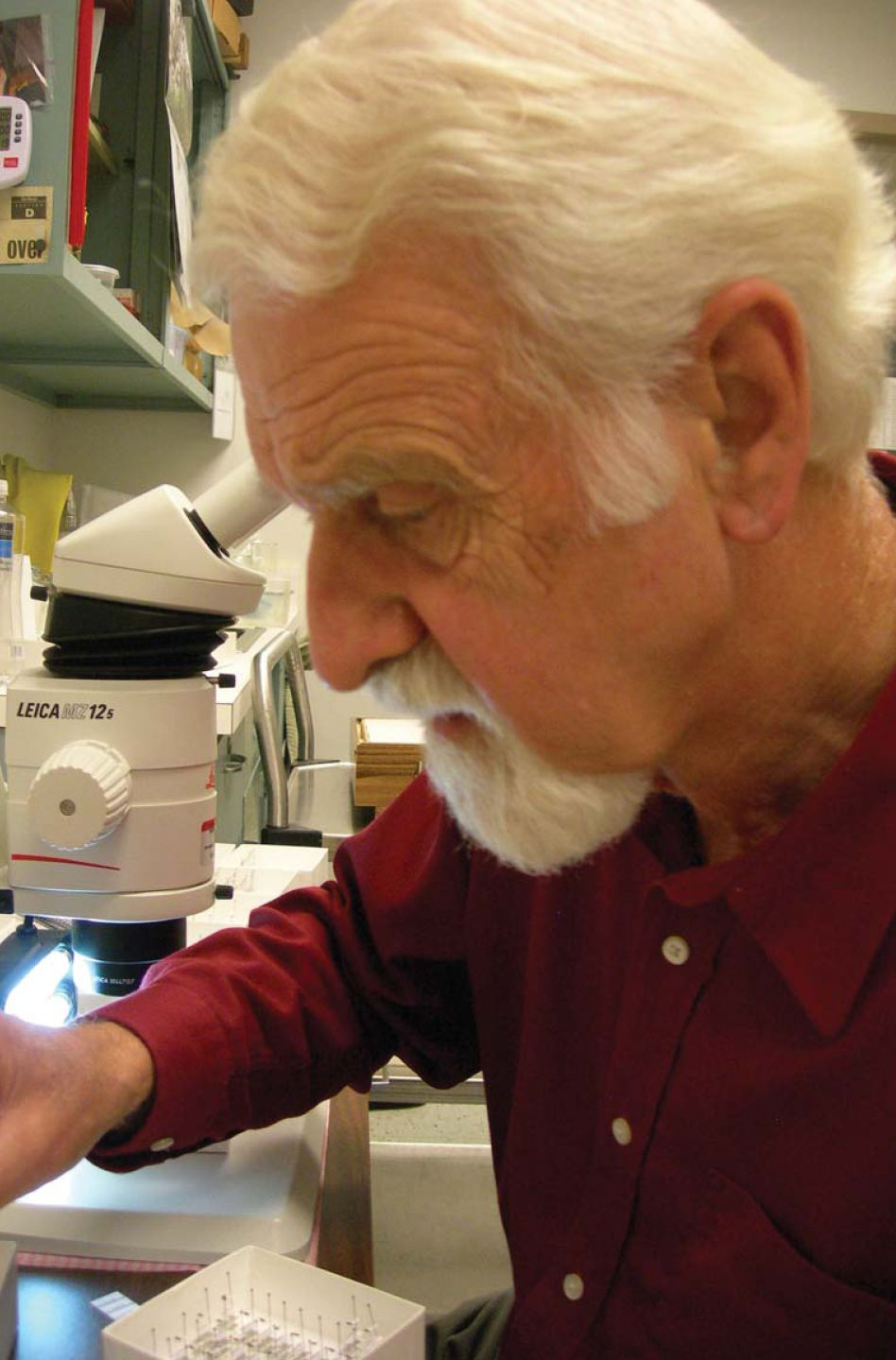
- Masner in 2019
- Born: April 18, 1934 (age 92); Czechoslovakia
- Education: Charles University; Czechoslovak Academy of Sciences
- Scientific career
- Fields: Entomology; Taxonomy; Systematics
- Workplaces: Canadian National Collection (CNC) of Insects, Arachnids and Nematodes

Lubomír Masner (born April 18, 1934) is a Czech Canadian entomologist, taxonomist, and systematist. His work focuses on Hymenopteran parasitoids, particularly in the superfamilies Proctotrupoidea, Platygastroidea, and Ceraphronoidea. He is responsible for describing many new species, genera, and families of wasps and has completed revisions for these taxonomic groups throughout his career.

== Early life and education ==
Lubomír Masner was born on April 18, 1934 in Czechoslovakia. He collected insects from a young age and was encouraged to study Hymenoptera by Oldřich Šustera.

He studied zoology with a focus on entomology at Charles University, earning his BSc in 1952 and his MSc in 1957, before beginning his doctoral studies at the Entomological Institute of the Czechoslovak Academy of Sciences. He earned his doctorate in 1962.

== Research and career ==
In 1962, Masner completed a one-year postdoctoral fellowship at the former Biocontrol Laboratory of Agriculture Canada in Belleville, ON. From 1966 to 1968 he completed a second postdoctoral fellowship at Simon Fraser University in Burnaby, BC. In 1969, he completed a third postdoctoral fellowship at the University of California, Berkeley.

Following the Warsaw Pact invasion of Czechoslovakia in 1968, Masner relocated to Canada permanently and began working at the Canadian National Collections of Insects, Arachnids and Nematodes (CNC) at Agriculture and Agri-Food Canada (AAFC) in Ottawa, ON. He worked at the CNC from 1969 until his retirement in 1996, though he continues to work in the collections as an emeritus researcher.

== Awards and honours ==
=== Fellowships ===
- 1962, Postdoctoral Fellowship, Biocontrol Laboratory of Agriculture Canada, Belleville, ON
- 1966, Postdoctoral Fellowship, Simon Fraser University, Burnaby, BC
- 1969, Postdoctoral Fellowship, University of California, Berkeley, CA
- 1983, New Zealand Ministry of Scientific and Industrial Research
- 1983, Commonwealth Scientific and Industrial Research Organisation of Australia (CSIRO)
- 1996, Visiting Fellowship, Japan Society for Promotion of Science
- 2005, Fellowship, Entomological Society of America

=== Awards ===
- 1999, Gold Medal, Entomological Society of Canada
- 2024, Czech Entomological Society (ČSE)

=== Positions ===
- 1982–1987, President, International Society of Hymenopterists
- 1986–2005, Board of Directors, American Entomological Institute
- 1986–?, Grants Committee, CanaColl Foundation

Eponyms

Many species and genera have been named in honour of Masner. Below is a list of some of these taxa:

- Masner Mikó & Deans
- Masnerella Özdikmen
- Masneretus Buhl
- Masneria Szabó
- Masnerium Polaszek
- Masnerolyta Buhl
- Masneroma Bouček
- Masnerosema Sundholm
- Neanaperiallus masneri Gibson, 2009
- Acanthaegilips masneri Sporrong & Ros-Farré
- Adelphe masneri Kimsey
- Agriotypus masneri Bennett
- Alabagrus masneri Sharkey
- Alysia masneri Wharton
- Anaprixia masneri Mason
- Anastatus masneri Gibson
- Andesianellus masneri Anderson & Morrone
- Apodryinus masneri Olmi
- Apometagea masneri Heraty
- Araucastigmus masneri Finnamore
- Eriastichus masneri La Salle
- Masner lubomirus Deans & Mikó
