= Alan Parkhurst Dodd =

Australian entomologist (1896–1981)

Alan Parkhurst Dodd (8 January 1896 – 3 July 1981) was an entomologist in Australia. He introduced the Cactoblastis moth as a biological control for prickly pear. His father was the entomologist Frederick Parkhurst Dodd.

He was featured in the Magnificent Makers exhibition at the State Library of Queensland in 2018.
