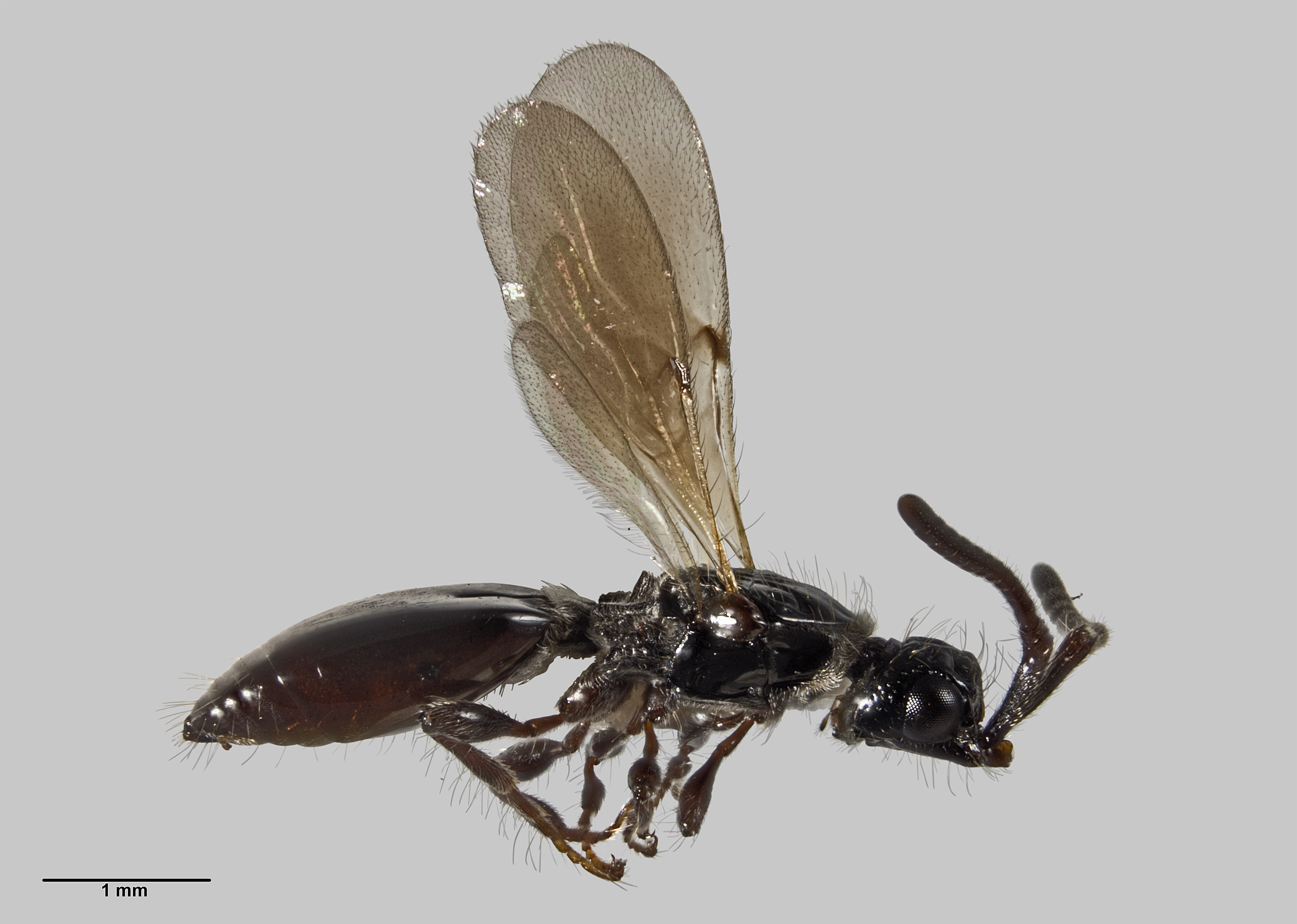
- Neurogalesus carinatus

Scientific classification
- Kingdom: Animalia
- Phylum: Arthropoda
- Class: Insecta
- Order: Hymenoptera
- Family: Diapriidae
- Subfamily: Diapriinae; Haliday, 1833

= Diapriinae =

Subfamily of wasps

Diapriinae is a subfamily of parasitoid wasps.

== Taxonomy ==
Diapriinae contains three tribes: Diapriini, Psilini and Spilomicrini. The subfamily also contains the following genera:

- Aneurhynchus
- Antarctopria
- Antropria
- Aulacopria
- Caecopria
- Calogalesus
- Cerapsilon
- Cordylocras
- Cyathopria
- Erasikea
- Eunuchopria
- Geodiapria
- Hemilexomyia
- Leaiopria
- Lepidopria
- Malvina
- Oxypria
- Peckidium
- Plagiopria
- Probetyla
- Solenopsia
- Symphytopria
- Termitopria
- Tetramopria
- Valia
