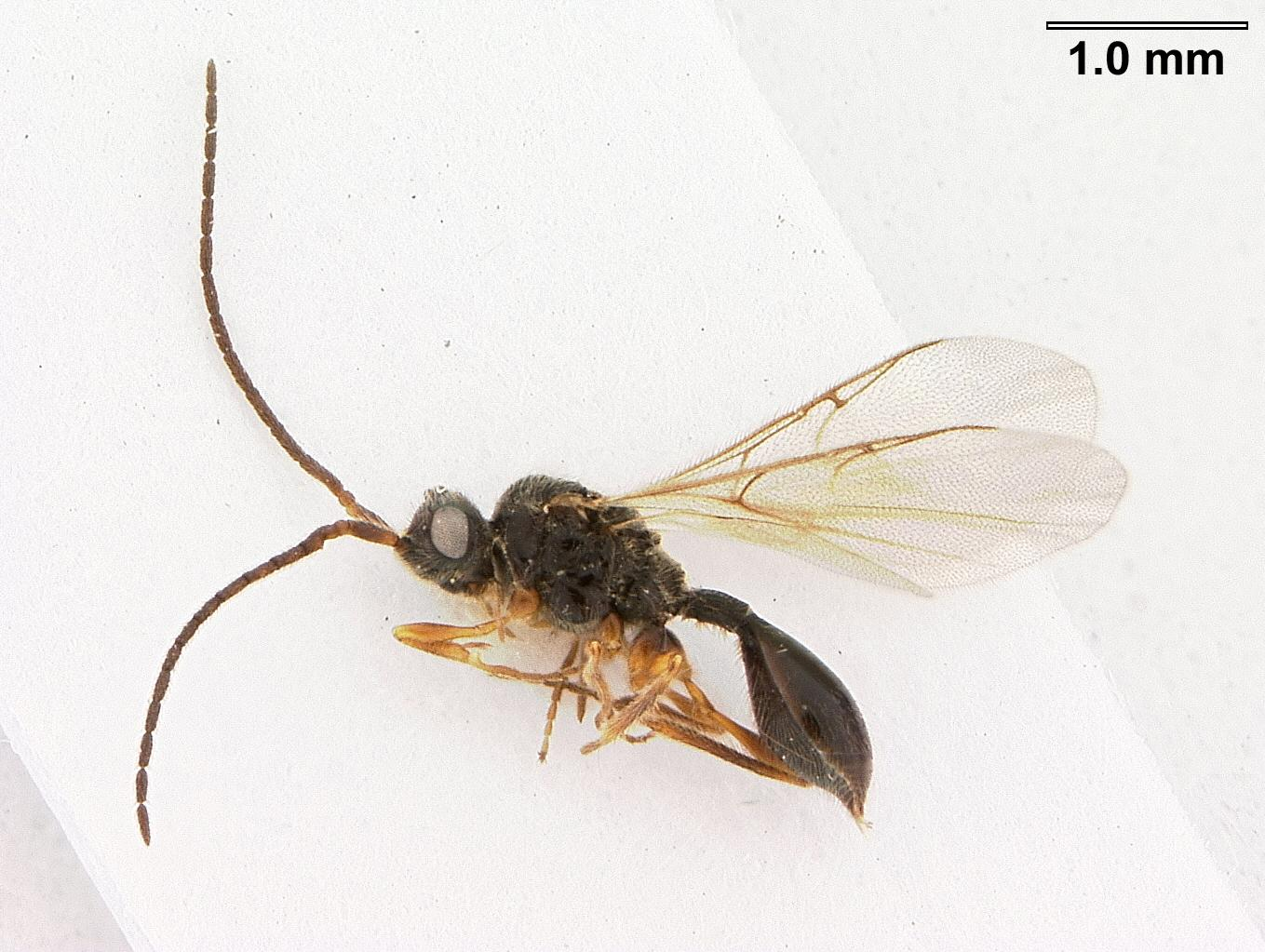
- Aclista

Scientific classification
- Kingdom: Animalia
- Phylum: Arthropoda
- Clade: Pancrustacea
- Class: Insecta
- Order: Hymenoptera
- Superfamily: Diaprioidea
- Family: Diapriidae; Haliday, 1833

Subfamilies
- Ambositrinae; Belytinae; Diapriinae

Diversity
- ca. 150 genera

= Diapriidae =

Diapriidae Temporal range: Albian–Recent

Family of wasps

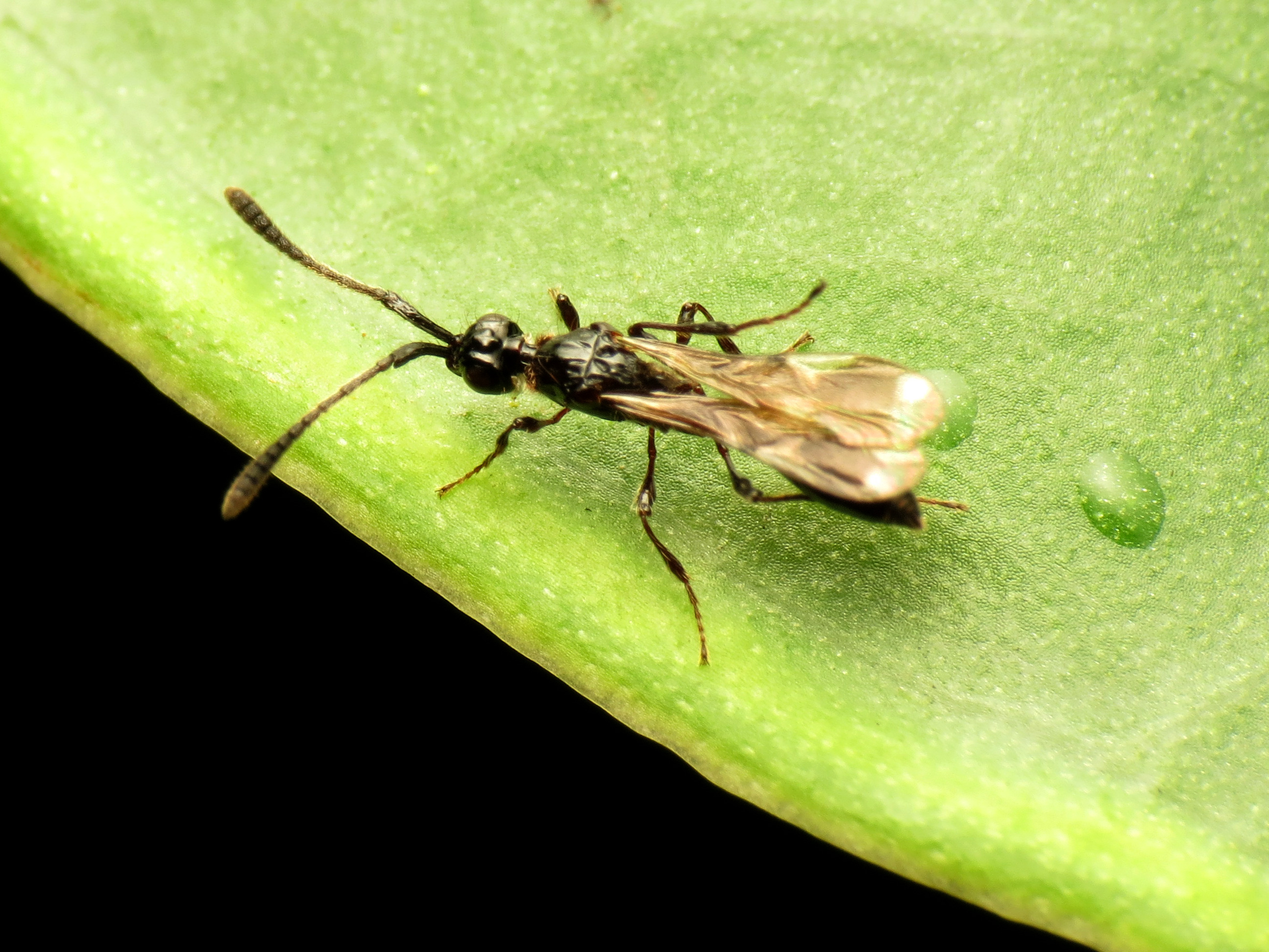
undetermined Diapriidae from Costa Rica

The Diapriidae are a family of parasitoid wasps. These tiny insects have an average length of 2–4 mm and never exceed 8 mm. They typically attack larvae and pupae of a wide range of insects, especially flies. The about 2,300 described species in around 200 described genera are divided into three subfamilies, and the group has a global distribution.

Diapriids show considerable diversity of form, with aptery (lack of wings) fairly common, sometimes in both sexes. Nearly all species exhibit noticeable sexual dimorphism, with males and females often mistaken for separate species. The wings, when present, show characteristically reduced venation, with the greatest reduction in the subfamilies Ambositrinae and Diapriinae.

== Selected genera ==
- Acanopsilus
- Acanosema
- Acanthopsilus
- Aclista
- Acropiesta
- Anaclista
- Aneurhynchus
- Aneuropria
- Anommatium
- Antropria
- Aprestes
- Archaeopria
- Atomopria
- Aulacopria
- Auxopaedeutes
- Basalys
- Belyta
- Bruesopria
- Cardiopsilus
- Cerapsilon
- Cinetus
- Coptera
- Cordylocras
- Cyathopria
- Diapria
- Diphora
- Doliopria
- Ecitovagus
- Entomacis
- Erasikea
- Eumiota
- Eunuchopria
- Geodiapria
- Gwaihiria
- †Iberopria
- Idiotypa
- Labidopria
- Labolips
- Lepidopria
- Lyteba
- Macrohynnis
- Maoripria
- Miota
- Monelata
- Myrmecopria
- Neurogalesus
- Opazon
- Oxylabis
- Oxypria
- Pamis
- Panbelista
- Pantoclis
- Pantolyta
- Pantolytomyia
- Parabetyla
- Paramesius
- Paroxylabis
- Pentapria
- Plagiopria
- Platymischus
- Polypeza
- Praeaclista
- Propsilomma
- Psilomma
- Psilommacra
- Psilus
- Rhynchopsilus
- Scorpioteleia
- Solenopsia
- Spilomicrus
- Symphytopria
- Synacra
- Synbelyta
- Tetramopria
- Townesella
- Trichopria
- Valia
- Viennopria
- †Xenomorphia
- Zygota
