= Pison marginatum =

Scientific classification
- Kingdom: Animalia
- Phylum: Arthropoda
- Clade: Pancrustacea
- Class: Insecta
- Order: Hymenoptera
- Family: Crabronidae
- Genus: Pison
- Species: P. marginatum

Binomial name
- Pison marginatum F. Smith, 1858

Species of insect

Pison marginatum is a wasp of the family Crabronidae. It is found in Australia, South East Asia and many of the islands of the Pacific Ocean.

== Description ==
The species has a primarily black head and body, with occasional red tinge to the legs of some specimens. Female specimens measure from 9.5 to 11.7 millimetres in length, while male specimens range between 7.5 and 12.6 millimetres. It can be distinguished from Pison spinolae due to the lack of long erect hairs.

== Distribution ==
Pison morosum is found throughout Australia, Indonesia, Malaysia, the Philippines, Micronesia, Melanesia and Polynesia, as far north as Hawaii. The species was first recognised as an introduced species in New Zealand in 2020, but due to its wide range was likely introduced much earlier.

== See also ==
- Pulawski, W.J. (2018). "A revision of the wasp genus Pison Jurine, 1808 of Australia and New Zealand, New Guinea and the Pacific islands (Hymenoptera: Crabronidae)". Proceedings of the California Academy of Sciences. 4. 56: 1–584.
