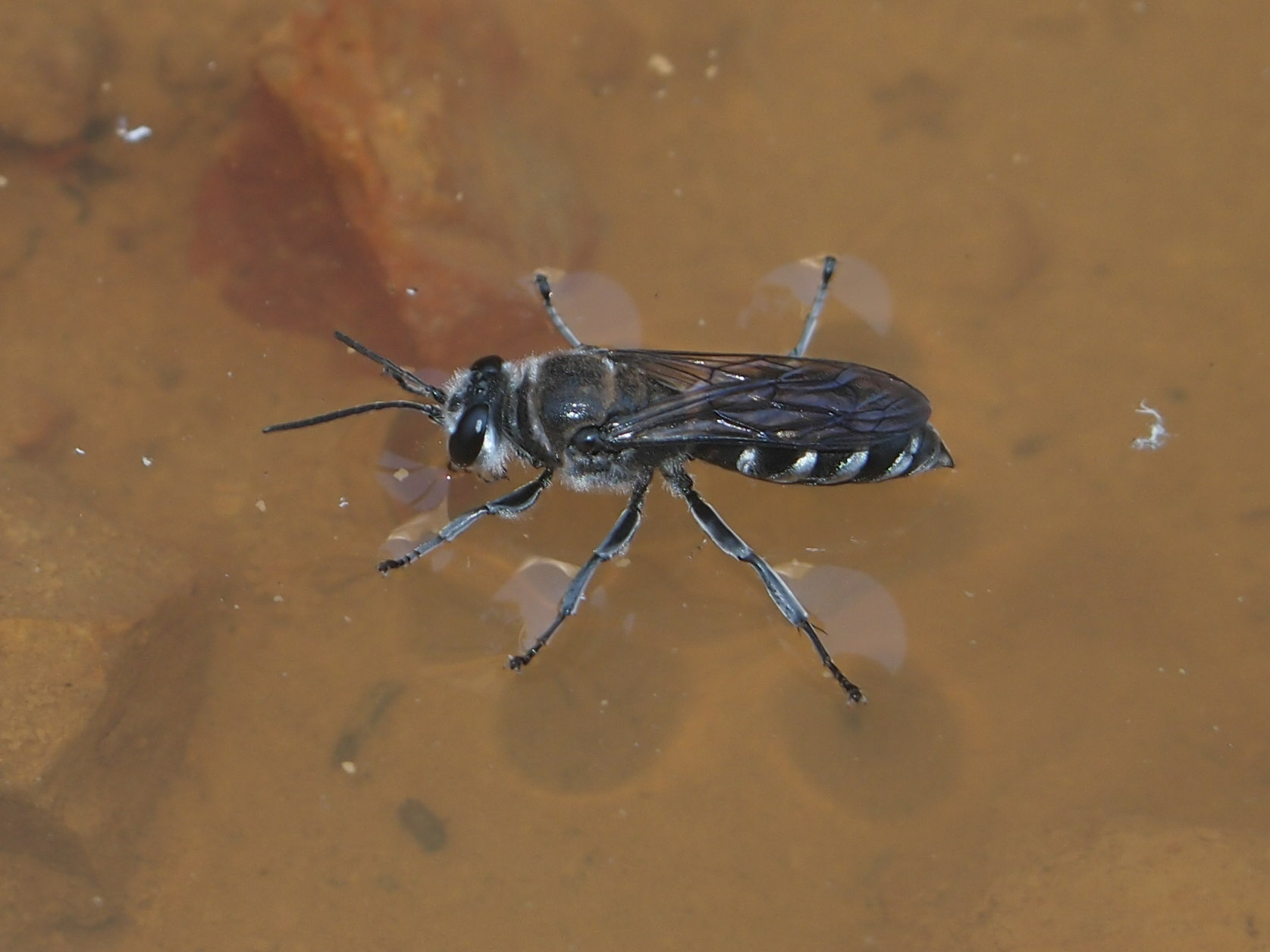
- A wasp of the genus Pison gathering water for nest construction.

Scientific classification
- Domain: Eukaryota
- Kingdom: Animalia
- Phylum: Arthropoda
- Class: Insecta
- Order: Hymenoptera
- Family: Crabronidae
- Tribe: Trypoxylini
- Genus: Pison; Spinola 1808

Species
- See text

= Pison =

Genus of wasps

Pison is a cosmopolitan genus of wasps within the family Crabronidae. The genus comprises 145 described species, although many species, especially in South America remain undescribed.

== Distribution ==
The genus is found throughout the tropical and warm temperate regions of the world, but does not extend into the more northerly temperate regions. Most species occur in the Southern Hemisphere, with a third of species occurring in Australia. This distribution pattern has been thought to indicate that the genus was once much larger, and has declined in the face of competition with more competitive wasp genera, leaving the genus largely concentrated in geographically-isolated regions.

The habit of many species of building nests in holes in wood, keyholes, and similar situations has led to a number of species being distributed widely by ships and aircraft. Several species, including P. argentatum and P. iridipenne are of uncertain native distribution, having been dispersed by humans in antiquity.

== Biology ==
Pison wasps raise their young on a diet of living, but paralysed, spiders. Spiders are collected by adult females, paralysed by means of a sting, and an egg is laid on the spider or spiders before they are sealed into a chamber constructed by the female. The paralysed spiders do not decay, and upon hatching the wasp larva eats the spider, before pupating and emerging from the chamber as an adult.

While many species construct large mud nests in sheltered situations such as caves or tree hollows, other species make use of natural cavities such as hollow plant stems, beetle burrows, or abandoned bird nests, while still others dig their own nesting tunnels. Typically, multiple spiders-and-egg cells will be placed adjacent to one another in a larger nesting structure. Each cell is sealed off from adjoining eggs with mud or dung pellets. This sealing off of the young from each other is probably done to prevent competition and ensure that each young obtains sufficient food.

== Species and other subtaxa ==
At one time the genus Pison was divided into the subgenera Pison, Pisonoides, Krombeiniellum, and Entomopison. These were later discarded in favor of species groups including (for the Americas):

- Conforme
- Fritzi
- Eremnon
- Delicatum
- Agile
- Stangei
- Krombeini
- Euryops
- Cressoni
- Chilense
- Convexifrons
- Pilosum

=== Accepted species ===
The following species are accepted as of 21 February 2018:

- †Pison antiquum Antropov and Puławski, 1996
- Pison argentatum Shuckard, 1838
- Pison ashmeadi R.Turner, 1916
- Pison assimile Sickmann, 1894
- Pison atripenne Gussakovskij, 1938
- Pison atrum (Spinola) 1808
- Pison auratum Shuckard, 1838
- Pison aureosericeum Rohwer, 1915
- Pison aurifex F. Smith, 1869
- Pison auriventre R.Turner, 1908
- Pison baguione Tsuneki, 1983
- Pison barbatum Evans, 1981
- Pison basale F. Smith, 1869
- Pison biroi Tsuneki, 1983
- Pison bismarckianum Tsuneki, 1982
- Pison brasilium Menke, 1988
- Pison browni (Ashmead), 1905
- Pison cameronii Kohl, 1893
- Pison carinatum R.Turner, 1917
- Pison chilense Spinola, 1851
- Pison chrysops Menke, 1988
- Pison chrysoptilum Antropov, 1994
- Pison ciliatum Evans, 1981
- †Pison cockerellae Rohwer, 1908
- Pison collare Kohl, 1884
- Pison conforme F. Smith, 1869
- Pison congener R.Turner, 1916
- Pison cressoni Rohwer, 1911
- Pison decipiens F. Smith, 1869
- Pison delicatum Menke, 1988
- Pison dementia Menke, 1988
- Pison denticeps Cameron, 1910
- Pison deperditum R.Turner, 1917
- Pison differens R.Turner, 1916
- Pison difficile Turner, 1908
- Pison dimidiatum F. Smith, 1869
- Pison dives R.Turner, 1916
- Pison doggonum Menke, 1988
- Pison duckei Menke, 1968
- †Pison electrum Antropov and Puławski, 1989
- †Pison eocenicum Nel, 2005
- Pison erebus Menke, 1988
- Pison eremnon Menke, 1968
- Pison erimaense Tsuneki, 1983
- Pison erythrocerum Kohl, 1885
- Pison erythrogastrum Rohwer, 1915
- Pison erythropus Kohl, 1884
- Pison esakii Yasumatsu, 1937
- Pison eu Menke, 1988
- Pison euryops Menke, 1988
- Pison exclusum R.Turner, 1916
- Pison exornatum R.Turner, 1916
- Pison exultans R.Turner, 1916
- Pison eyvae Menke, 1988
- Pison fasciatum (Radoszkowski) 1876
- Pison fenestratum F. Smith, 1869
- Pison festivum F. Smith, 1869
- Pison fraterculus R.Turner, 1916
- Pison fritzi Menke, 1988
- Pison fuscipenne F. Smith, 1869
- Pison glabrum Kohl, 1908
- †Pison glyptum Zhang, 1989
- Pison hahadzimaense Tsuneki, 1984
- Pison hissaricum Gussakovskij, 1937
- Pison hospes F. Smith, 1879
- Pison huonense Tsuneki, 1983
- Pison icarioides Turner, 1908
- Pison ignavum R.Turner, 1908
- Pison impunctatum R.Turner, 1912
- Pison inaequale R.Turner, 1916
- Pison inconspicuum R.Turner, 1916
- Pison infumatum R.Turner, 1908
- Pison insigne Sickmann, 1894
- Pison insulare F. Smith, 1869
- Pison iridipenne F. Smith, 1879
- Pison irramulus T. Li and Q. Li, 2011
- Pison Kohlii Bingham, 1897
- Pison koreense (Radoszkowski) 1887
- Pison korrorense Yasumatsu, 1937
- Pison krombeini Menke, 1968
- Pison laeve F. Smith, 1856
- Pison larsoni Menke, 1988
- Pison lillo Menke, 1988
- Pison liupanshanense T. Li and Q. Li, 2011
- Pison lobiferum Arnold, 1945
- Pison lutescens R.Turner, 1916
- Pison maculipenne F. Smith, 1860
- Pison maculipenne F. Smith, 1873
- Pison marginatum F. Smith, 1856
- Pison mariannense Yasumatsu, 1953
- Pison martini Menke, 1988
- Pison melanocephalum R.Turner, 1908
- †Pison menkei Bennett and Engel, 2008
- Pison meridionale R.Turner, 1916
- Pison mimicum Arnold, 1945
- Pison morosum F. Smith, 1856
- Pison multistrigatum R.Turner, 1917
- Pison neotropicum Menke, 1968
- Pison nigellum Krombein, 1949
- Pison ningyuenfuense Antropov, 1994
- Pison nitidum F. Smith, 1859
- Pison noctulum R.Turner, 1908
- Pison nogorombu Puławski, 1989
- Pison nosferatu Menke, 1988
- Pison novabritanicae Tsuneki, 1982
- Pison novaguineanum Tsuneki, 1983
- Pison novocaledonicum Krombein, 1949
- Pison nozakae Tsuneki, 1983
- Pison oakleyi Krombein, 1949
- Pison obesum Arnold, 1958
- Pison obliquum F. Smith, 1856
- Pison obliteratum F. Smith, 1858
- †Pison oligocenum Cockerell in Rohwer, 1908
- Pison orientale Cameron, 1897
- Pison pallidipalpe F. Smith, 1863
- Pison papuanum W. Schulz, 1905
- Pison pasteelsi Leclercq, 1965
- Pison peletieri Le Guillou, 1841
- Pison pentafasciatum Menke, 1988
- Pison perplexum F. Smith, 1856
- Pison pertinax R.Turner, 1908
- Pison petularum Leclercq, 1965
- Pison phthinylla Menke, 1988
- Pison pistillum Menke, 1988
- Pison plaumanni Menke, 1968
- Pison ponape Krombein, 1949
- Pison pregustum Leclercq, 1965
- Pison premunitum Leclercq, 1965
- Pison priscum R.Turner, 1916
- Pison pulawskii Antropov, 1994
- Pison pulchrinum R.Turner, 1916
- Pison punctifrons Shuckard, 1838
- Pison punctulatum Kohl, 1884
- Pison regale F. Smith, 1852
- Pison repentinum Arnold, 1940
- Pison rothneyi Cameron, 1897
- Pison rufipes Shuckard, 1838
- Pison rufitarse Arnold, 1944
- Pison rugosum F. Smith, 1856
- Pison sarawakense Cameron, 1903
- Pison scabrum R.Turner, 1908
- Pison scruposum Arnold, 1955
- Pison separatum F. Smith, 1869
- Pison sericeum Kohl, 1888
- Pison seyrigi Arnold, 1945
- Pison simillimum F. Smith, 1869
- Pison simulans R.Turner, 1915
- Pison sogdianum Gussakovskij, 1937
- Pison speculare R.Turner, 1911
- Pison spinolae Shuckard, 1838
- Pison stangei Menke, 1968
- Pison strandi Yasumatsu, 1935
- Pison strenuum R.Turner, 1916
- Pison strictifrons Vachal, 1907
- Pison strigulosum R.Turner, 1917
- Pison susanae Cheesman, 1955
- Pison sylphe Menke, 1988
- Pison tahitense de Saussure, 1867
- Pison tenebrosum R.Turner, 1908
- Pison testaceipes R.Turner, 1916
- Pison tibiale F. Smith, 1869
- Pison tosawai Yasumatsu, 1935
- Pison transvaalense Cameron, 1910
- Pison transversistriatum Simon Thomas, 1993
- Pison trukense Yasumatsu, 1953
- Pison ugandense Arnold, 1955
- Pison vechti Antropov, 1994
- Pison vestitum F. Smith, 1856
- Pison virosum R.Turner, 1908
- Pison wagneri Arnold, 1932
- Pison westwoodii Shuckard, 1838
- Pison woji Menke, 1988
- Pison wollastoni R.Turner, 1916
- Pison xanthopus (Brullé) 1833

=== Pison nomina nuda ===
The following are not officially described and have nomen nudum status:

- Pison aurifer de Saussure
- Pison punctatus Ashmead

=== Species previously in Pison ===
These species have been transferred from Pison to other genera:

- Entomopison alini Antropov, 1996
- Pisonopsis areolatum Spinola, 1851
- Entomopison aureofaciale Strand, 1910
- Aulacophilinus caliginosus R.Turner, 1908
- Entomopison convexifrons Taschenberg, 1870
- Entomopison cooperi Menke, 1988
- Scapheutes flavopictum F. Smith, 1860
- Entomopison gnythos Menke, 1988
- Scapheutes laetum F. Smith, 1860
- Entomopison longicorne Menke, 1988
- Aulacophilinus mandibulatum R.Turner, 1916
- Trypoxylonvaripes nasutum Tsuneki
- Entomopison oaxaca Menke, 1988
- Bothynostethus paraense Spinola, 1851
- Entomopison pilosum F. Smith, 1873
- Aulacophilinus pyrrhicum Naumann, 1990
- Trypoxylon sapporoense Tsuneki
- Entomopison sphaerophallus Menke, 1988
- Pisonopsis variicornis Reed, 1894
- Entomopison vincenti Menke, 1988
- Entomopison wasbaueri Menke, 1988
- Aulacophilinus weiri Naumann, 1990
