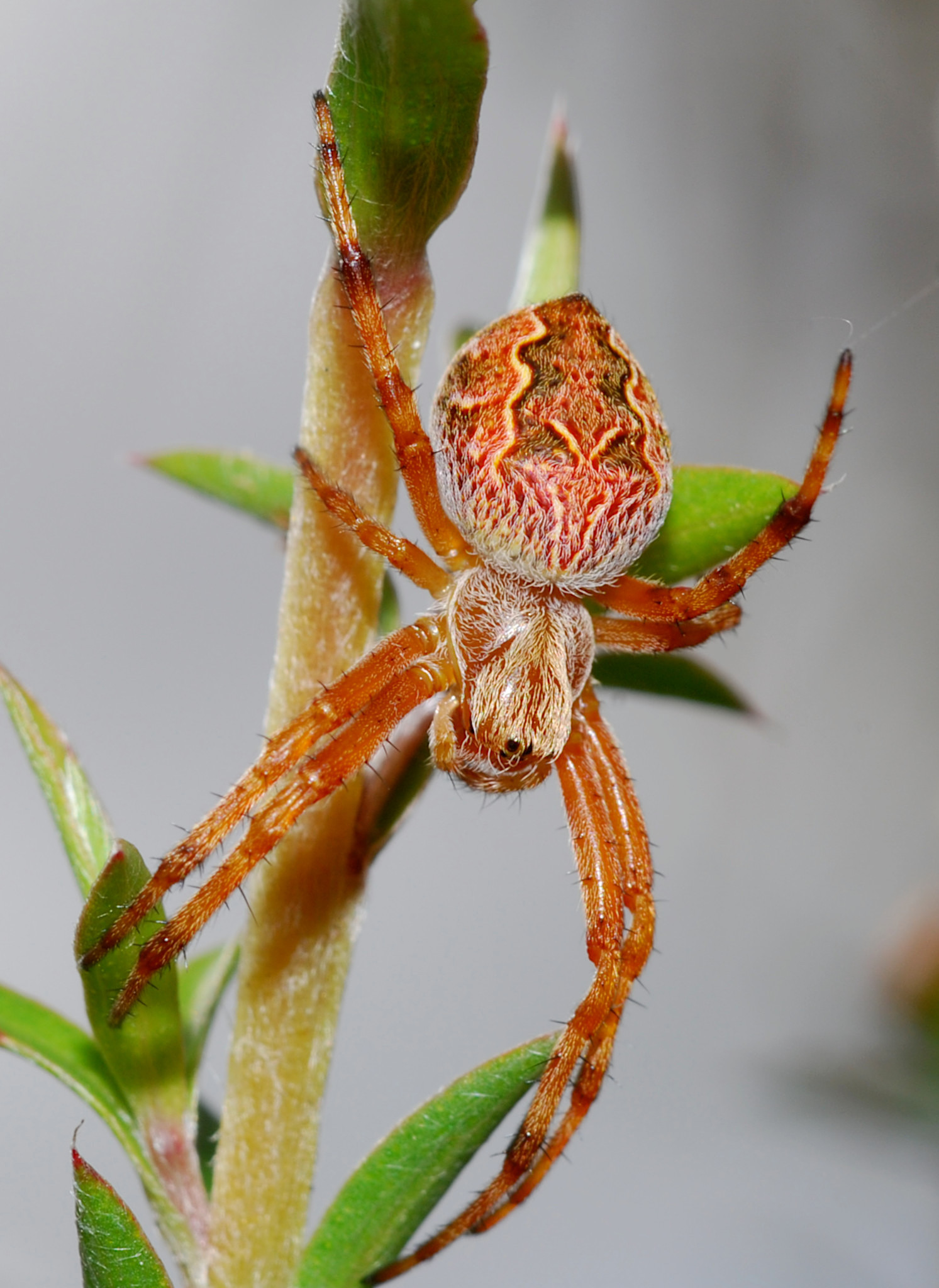

Scientific classification
- Domain: Eukaryota
- Kingdom: Animalia
- Phylum: Arthropoda
- Subphylum: Chelicerata
- Class: Arachnida
- Order: Araneae
- Infraorder: Araneomorphae
- Family: Araneidae
- Genus: Salsa
- Species: S. fuliginata

Binomial name
- Salsa fuliginata L. Koch, 1872

Synonyms
- Epeira fuliginata L. Koch, 1872; Epeira rubicundulus Keyserling, 1887; Araneus fuliginatus Simon, 1895; Araneus rubicundulus Rainbow, 1911; Cyclosa fuliginata Dondale, 1966; Salsa fuliginata Framenau & Pedro, 2022

= Salsa fuliginata =

Sooty orbweaver

Spider in the Salsa genus

Salsa fuliginata, commonly known as the sooty orbweaver, is a orb-weaver spider in the genus Salsa. The species is found throughout southeastern Australia and New Zealand.

== Taxonomy ==
Salsa fuliginata has a complicated taxonomic history. It was first described as Epeira fuliginata by L. Koch in 1872, and has since been varyingly classified as part of Araneus and Epeira. Dondale placed it in the genus Cyclosa in 1966, which was found to be incorrect based on molecular data in 2019, and its morphological differences from North American Cyclosa species. Salsa fuliginata was subsequently revised to form the type species of the genus Salsa in 2022.

== Description ==
=== Juvenile ===
Spiderlings of Salsa fuliginata have a black and yellowish-brown carapace. Spiderlings also feature a black pattern that is extended around the tip and over the ventral side on their smooth abdomen. The end of the dark part of the ventral side of the abdomen contains some white spots; the spiderlings also have a much lighter colour on their legs compared to when they are an adult. When the spiderlings grow to a total length of about 2.5mm, Salsa fuliginata females will have a squared shape at the anterior of the carapace and the posterior of the abdomen will be slightly angled. The carapaces of females are brownish at this size similar to males and both sexes' pattern on their abdomen bear a resemblance of an adult Salsa fuliginata. Immature males of this size have rather swollen palpi.

=== Adult ===
S. fuliginata males usually have a dark brown-orange carapace and a lustrous coat, with flat yellow setae throughout the carapace. The chelicerae of male S. fuliginata are orange-brown with three promarginal teeth and three retromarginal teeth, where the median promarginal teeth and basal retromarginal teeth are the largest. The basal of femora, trochanters and coxae are all brownish-yellow; other than these three areas, the whole leg is brown in colour. Males have a leg formula of I > II > III > IV, where the longest leg is the first leg and the shortest leg is the fourth leg. The ventral portion of the cephalothorax or the sternum is brown in colour and dorsum has a beige colour to it and males also have an olive-grey irregular large folium. The lateral portion of the folium is dark brown with some black spots. Underside of abdomen is dark brown followed by two white patches along the abdomen right behind the epigastric furrow. Salsa fuliginata male has a slightly curved and short paracymbium; conductor lobe is sturdy and attach to conductor from basal of embolus; median apophysis has a flat tip, has a C-shape and also lengthened, it is also basally pronounced with a reduced basal process. Terminal apophysis have overall rectangular shape with a projection at the tip which looks like a thumb; conductor is weakly sclerotised and flat; embolus of the male is straight, lengthen and also pronounced. According to Framenau and Pedro, males of Salsa fuliginata are mostly alike compared to Salsa recherchensis (Main, 1954) in the morphology of their genitals.

Nonetheless, median apophysis in S. fuliginata is much elongated and narrow compared to S. recherchensis; The obvious spine-like prong on the terminal apophysis found in S. recherchensis is also absent in S. fuliginata. Based on the research of Dondaleand Framenau & Pedro, adult males' total length are measured to be 3.2-5.5 mm based on 18 male adult specimens.

Sexual dimorphism exists in Salsa fuliginata, where the females are generally larger than the male like most spiders. Characteristics of female carapace and chelicerae are similar to male's with only one difference where three retromarginal teeth are of similar size in females. Legs of female are brownish-orange and mottled in light brown; leg formula for females are the same as males, where leg lengths have the formula, I > II > IV > III. Salsa fuliginata females have a dark brown labium; dark brown sternum with filled with grey setae; maxillae are brownish to dark brown; dorsal part and lateral part of abdomen are olive-grey a darker folium pattern. Ventral part of abdomen is similar to males where it is dark grey-olive with elongated ovoid pale bands paired with pale band behind epigastric furrow. Atrium of female Salsa fuliginata are shaped like a heart; spermatheca of the females are also spherical and huge in size. At the epigyne of S. fuliginata females, the atrium is not apparent due to the rotation of the epigyne relative to the abdomen. S. fuliginata females have total lengths ranging from 4.5-11.0 mm based on 30 specimens from two research studies (Dondale and Framenau & Pedro).

Variation in colour patterns is vast in Salsa fuliginata, particularly in the folium, the colour shades also vary from brownish red to dark brown and light beige to orangey.

== Distribution ==
Salsa fuliginata is native to southeastern Australia. It can be found in New South Wales, Victoria, Tasmania, and South Australia. It was introduced to New Zealand over 22 years ago, where it is found in Christchurch, Auckland, Wellington, and near Lake Taupō in the North Island.

== Habitat ==
Salsa fuliginata doesn't have a specific preferred habitat. This species is observed in open spaces with low-lying vegetation and in various types of forests. The collected specimens of Salsa fuliginata have been found in environments such as dry sclerophyll forests, open forests, bushes, shrubs, gardens, and swamps.

== Ecology ==
=== Life cycle/phenology ===
Not much is known about the life cycle of Salsa fuliginata, but it is assumed it shares an identical life cycle with other spiders consisting of four main stages: eggs, spiderlings, juveniles and adults. Because Australia and New Zealand are temperate countries, the spiders' mating and egg laying happens during spring and may continue over summer. After males and females mate, they split up where males will look for another mate and females will capture organisms in order to keep her developing eggs healthy. After a few weeks, female spiders hang their egg sacs near their web or even in their web after laying it. The eggs inside the egg sacs take about two to four weeks to hatch. After an average of two moults within the egg sac, spiderlings pierce through the strong membrane of the egg sac. Once the spiderlings go through their early moults and are independent, they usually disperse swiftly through ballooning. The spiderlings will then become juveniles after several moults until they reach their mature adult form, generally up to eight moults and some have moulted nine times, which then go through the life cycle again. In temperate regions like New Zealand and Australia, most spiders live only one year or at most two years, but these life cycles are only assumed for Salsa fuliginata since the life cycles of spiders has been investigated in only a minimal number of spider species. Based on Framenau & Pedro, Salsa fuliginata mature adults are common and mostly collected ranging from October and January. However, mature males of Salsa fuliginata reduced in the latter months especially September and February, which may indicate male's life expectancy which are usually low. However, for females they have relatively higher life expectancy, which in Framenau & Pedro's research showed that there are more female Salsa fuliginata specimens than males.

=== Diet ===
Like nearly all spiders, Salsa fuliginata are carnivores. They tend to feed on small insects such as flies, moths, and beetles captured in the webs that they construct. It has been observed preying on the light-brown apple moth.

=== Predators, parasites, and diseases ===
According to Keziah D'Souza, a masters student in University of Auckland, one of the species that prey on Salsa fulignata is Pison spinolae, which is more commonly known as the mason wasp. Pison spinolae is native to Australia and in 1880, it was introduced to New Zealand and can be found widely throughout New Zealand.
