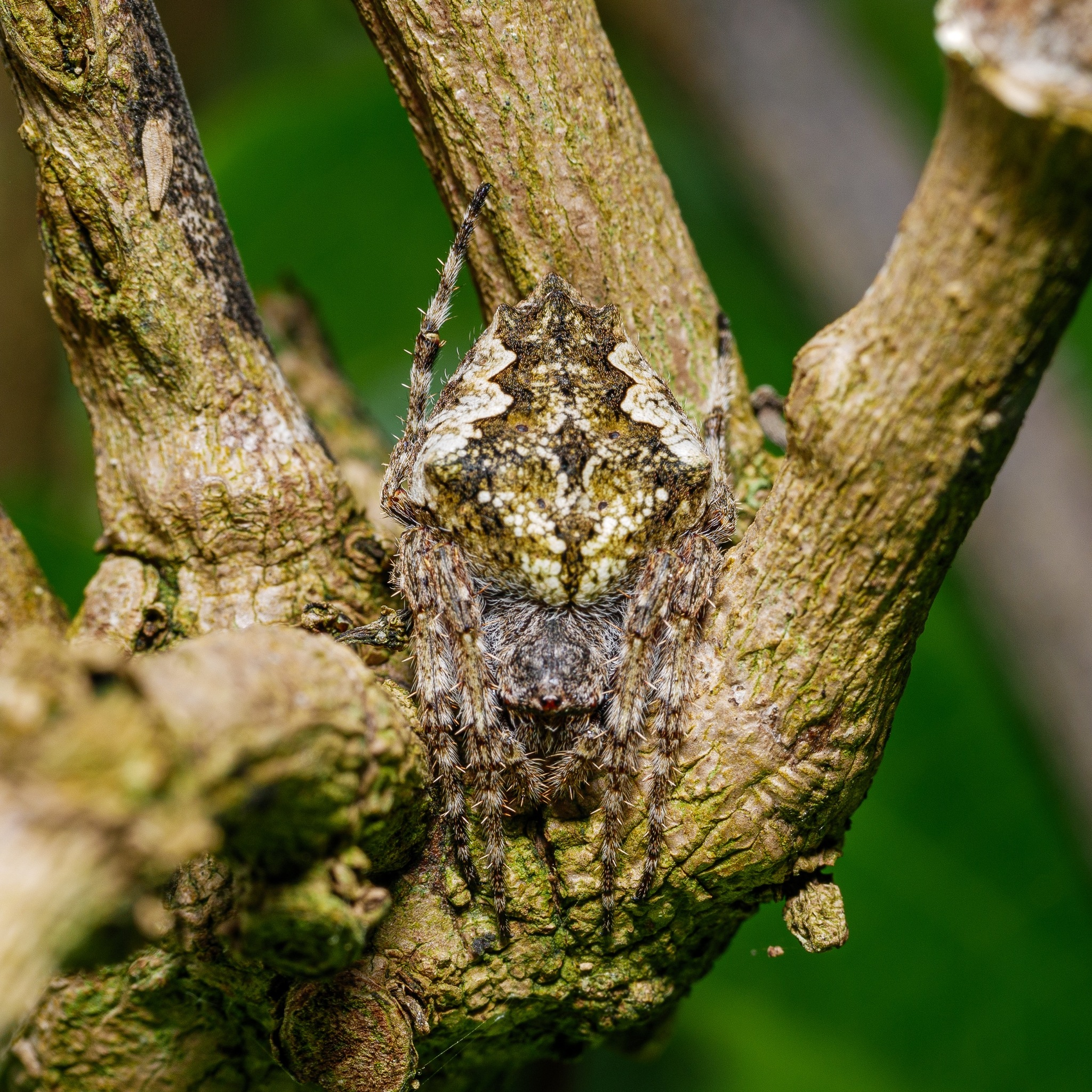
- The camouflage master of Socca pustolosa

Scientific classification
- Kingdom: Animalia
- Phylum: Arthropoda
- Subphylum: Chelicerata
- Class: Arachnida
- Order: Araneae
- Infraorder: Araneomorphae
- Family: Araneidae
- Genus: Socca
- Species: S. pustulosa

Binomial name
- Socca pustulosa (Walckenaer, 1841)

Synonyms
- Eriophora pustulosa

= Socca pustulosa =

Species of arachnid

Socca pustulosa, known as the knobbled orbweaver, is an orb-weaver spider species in the family Araneidae (Clerck, 1757).

== Taxonomy ==
Scientific name: Socca pustulosa (Walckenaer,1841). The species was first described in 1841 by a French scientist Charles Athanase Walckenaer from a female found in Tasmania, Australia. Walckenaer (1841), also had a male from New Zealand that he instead named as a different species- Epeira verrucosa. This situation remained until 1917, when Dalmas reviewed the broader context and recognised them as the same species. Although later placed in the genus Eriophora (as E. pustulosa), the evidence supporting that placement was said to not be fully convincing. As an alternative, a new genus was established in 2022 to accommodate them alongside 11 other species from Australia.

== Description ==
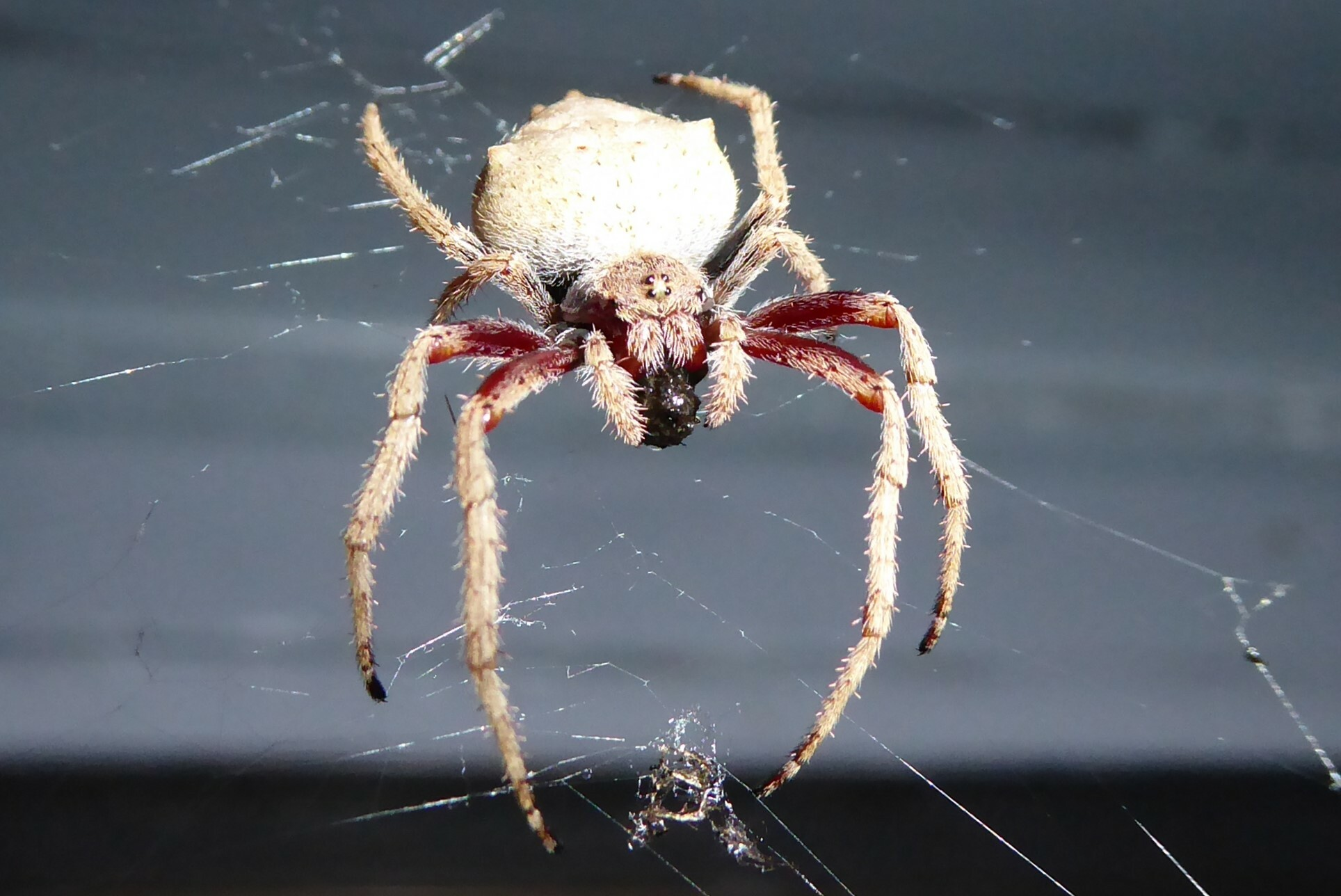
A reddish-brown S. pustulosa

Socca pustulosa is an example of a symmetry orb-weaving spider, which is a comparatively recent stage in web-building evolution. The abdominal form of this species has some useful general distinguishing features: a roughly triangular shape with two noticeable humps towards the front and five-pointed knobs on the upper rear abdomen. Interestingly, the abdomen surface of most individuals are covered with a leaf-shaped patterning, but different individuals show remarkable various colouration, ranging from reddish-brown to yellow or even green, while some have duller colours like greys, whites, or pure black. In general for many other types of spiders the females tend to be larger than males. This is also true for Socca pustulosa where mature females have a body length of about 11 mm, almost twice as large as males at about 6mm.

The precise identification of S. pustulosa mainly relies on the fine anatomy of their reproductive organs. In the male, the pedipalp has a unique tri-partite terminal apophysis. The terminal appendix is an elongated, sometimes threadlike apophysis located between two firmly sclerotised basal and apical lobes. In terms of the female genitalia, the epigyne plate appears roughly square-shaped in ventral view and has a broad atrium. The scape, which bears relatively long setae, is elongated and typically extends beyond the posterior margin of the epigyne plate. Mouthparts also can aid precise recognition, with four teeth on pro-margin of the Chelicerae and three on their retro-margin; which aid them in holding prey.

== Geographic Distribution and habitat ==
=== Natural global range ===
The species of Socca pustulosa is native to Australia and occupies vast territorial areas from Southern Australia- Tasmania and crosses the sea from Victoria, New South Wales, and Queensland. In addition, the species exists throughout New Zealand and is also recorded on many other Pacific islands.

=== New Zealand range ===
Presumably, S. pustulosa migrated to New Zealand from Australia by ballooning on silk, which means using small silk strands as "balloons" and being carried by the breeze. Today, this spider species can be found throughout New Zealand, where is probably the most abundant species of large spider in the country. Its distribution includes the South Island, North Island, Chatham Islands, Campbell Island, and Bounty Islands.

=== Habitat preferences ===
Socca pustulosa tends to stay in any open vegetation habitat exposed to the sun, occupying a wide range of shrublands, forests, and even gardens. Nevertheless, they rarely penetrate deep into dense native forests. Instead, their prey will determine their habitat preferences and whether have enough structures to help them disperse and support their webs, which is the critical factor to hunt, including tree branches, twigs, weeds, fences, and bushes. In contrast, landscape alteration and fragmentation are caused by anthropogenic effects, deforestation, and urbanisation, which have provided many suitable habitats for them.

== Life cycle/phenology ==
The life cycle of S. pustulosa begins with eggsacs, mature females S. pustulosa tend to lay eggsacs during late summer or early autumn. Surprisingly, the number of pink eggs in a single eggsac can reach several hundred, which the females wrap up in olive green silky cocoons. Some survey review that female spiders would lay another eggsac upon the first one and repeat; they rest on it occasionally, presumably that is for protection reasons. After approximately seventeen days, these juvenile orbweb spiders hatch from eggs and grow up quickly; moreover, the spiderlings are exceptionally capable of performing every step required to spin webs without guidance from parents because most of them disperse by ballooning by natural forces.

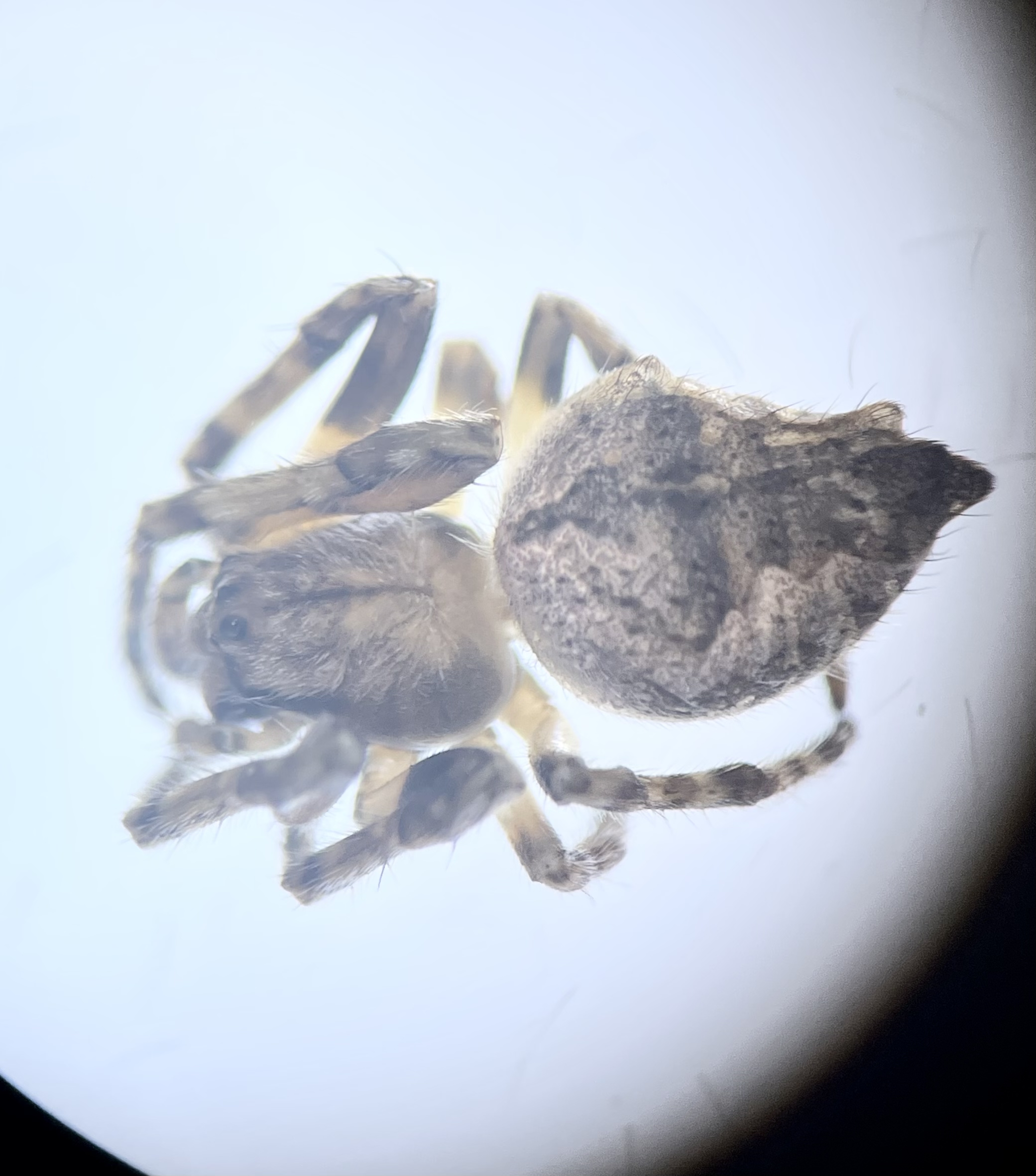
A baby S. pustulosa

After the S. pustulosa spidering molting (shed their juvenile skin) a couple of times and fully grown sexually mature, most of them enter adulthood in the summertime and start looking for mates. However, when male species reach this stage, they seem to lose interest in web building and preying, instead, they look for mating. The process of reproduction is to produce sperm in the abdomen and then transferred it to the pedipalp, while sperms are injected into the female's epigyne during copulation. Once the injection process finish, the male leaves quickly so as not to be eaten as food by the female. The peak mating season is summer, particularly during warm and humid evenings, and the period will last until the winter months if the weather is still mild. Finally, a new generation of mature females lay egg sacs, and the lifecycle will restart again.

== Diet and foraging ==
Like any other orbweb spider, Socca pustulosa uses its typical spider webs to prey on flying insects; small insects like flies, moths, beetles, wasps, and mosquitoes become their primary food source. Nearly all orbweb spiders are nocturnal; therefore, web-constructing usually takes place at night, but sometimes they may also be found spinning their web in the middle of the day if the weather is dull or overcast.

The intricate orbweb is their efficient predation tool, silk is produced by spiders through specialized glands called spinnerets, which are situated at the end of their abdomen. To begin with, females S. pustolosa spend some time exploring their surroundings, laying a dragline as they travel back and forth, that not only expands their boundary threads from suspension but also might leave for later web forming. After a strong top bridge line linking two trees or bushes, the next step is to spin several anchor points attached to each side, using one of the loose threads pulled down vertically to form a Y-shape as the central structure, with more silk reinforcing the central hub from which spiral outwards; noticeably that this first radiational orbweb is not sticky but act as a framework. Following the first layer, the spider exchanges silk production into sticky silk form, starting a spiral at the outer edge of the web by crossing between the non-sticky wave that radiates from the centre hub to its edge, more specifically called dry scaffold threads; thus, a new glinting enduring orbweb is ready for the hunt. At this stage, the spiders rest in a head-downwards position and enter into stationary prey mode; when detecting the vibration from any ‘food’ mistakenly enters their territory, they can quickly swing down and prey.

.

== Predators, Parasites, and Diseases ==
While S. pustulosa are predominantly predators, other creatures can frequently prey on them. In New Zealand, there are many parasitoid wasps targeting spiders and insects. Unlike parasites, parasitoids ultimately cause the death of their host. For instance, Pison spinolae, widely recognised as the mason wasp, belong to the solitary member of the Crabronidae family and is distributed across the entire New Zealand region; it commonly prey on orb-weaving spiders. The mason wasps use venom through their stinger to inject into spiders which paralyses them. Then, using their strong legs to drag their prey back to the burrow, the spider is placed in the mud-walled chamber and rendered immobile. The hatched grub eventually consumes the spider alive as nutrients until nothing remains.

Another well-known spider-hunting wasp is the spider wasp (family Pompilidae); for example, Priocnemis monachus (large black wasp), the female P. monachus hunt during daytime, swiftly stinging their chosen spider prey upon discovery, effectively paralyzing them. The incapacitated spider is subsequently dragged to a burrow and lays an egg on top of the spider's abdomen. Once the egg hatches, a larva emerges and gradually consumes the paralyzed spider while it remains alive until entirely devoured.

== Other information ==
Dr Pedro Castanheira and his co-author, Dr Volker Framenau are from Brazil and Germany, respectively, and their love for soccer prompted them to name the spider after their favourite hobby. Moreover, their research paper coincided with the World Cup.

== Gallery ==
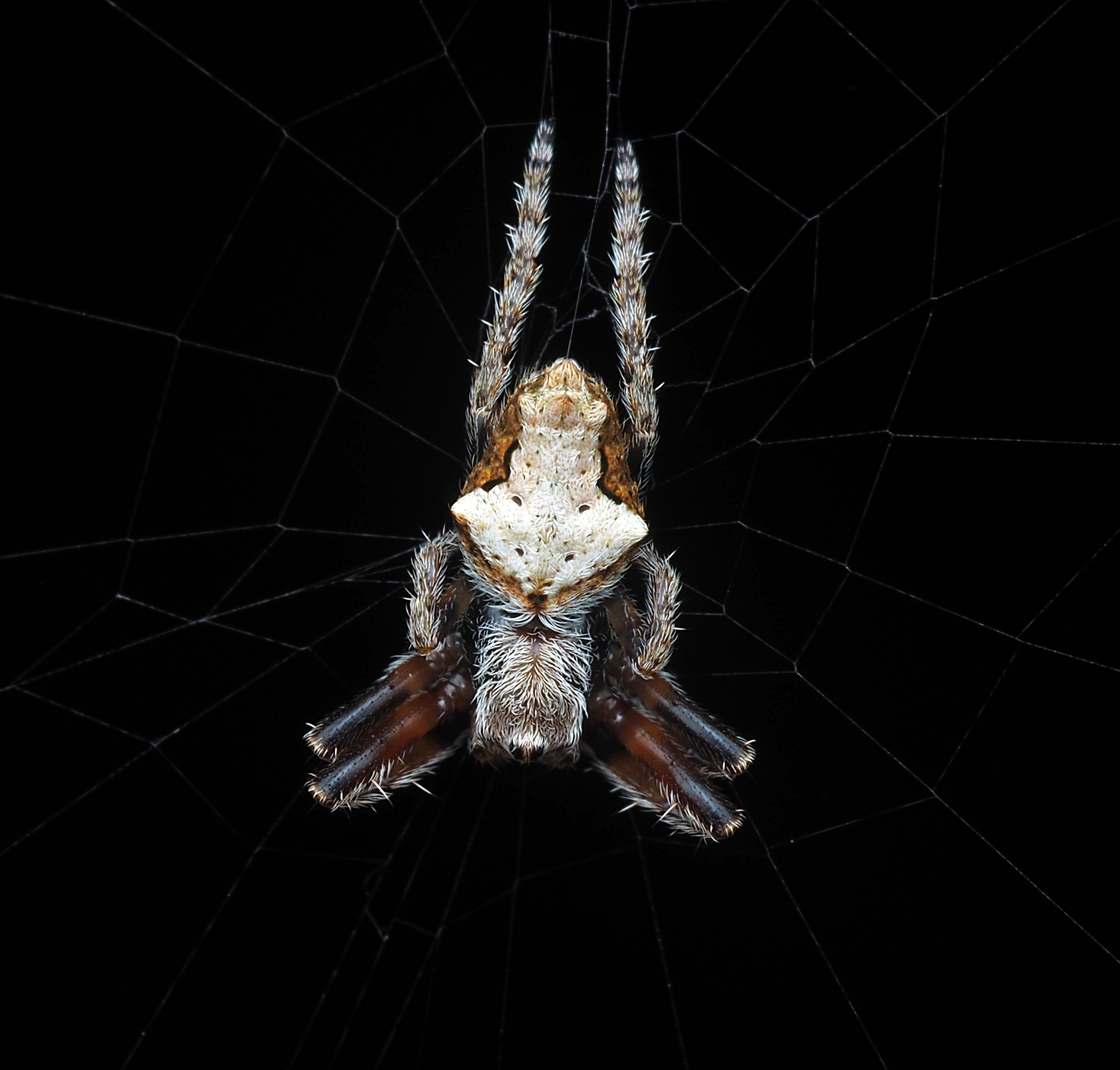

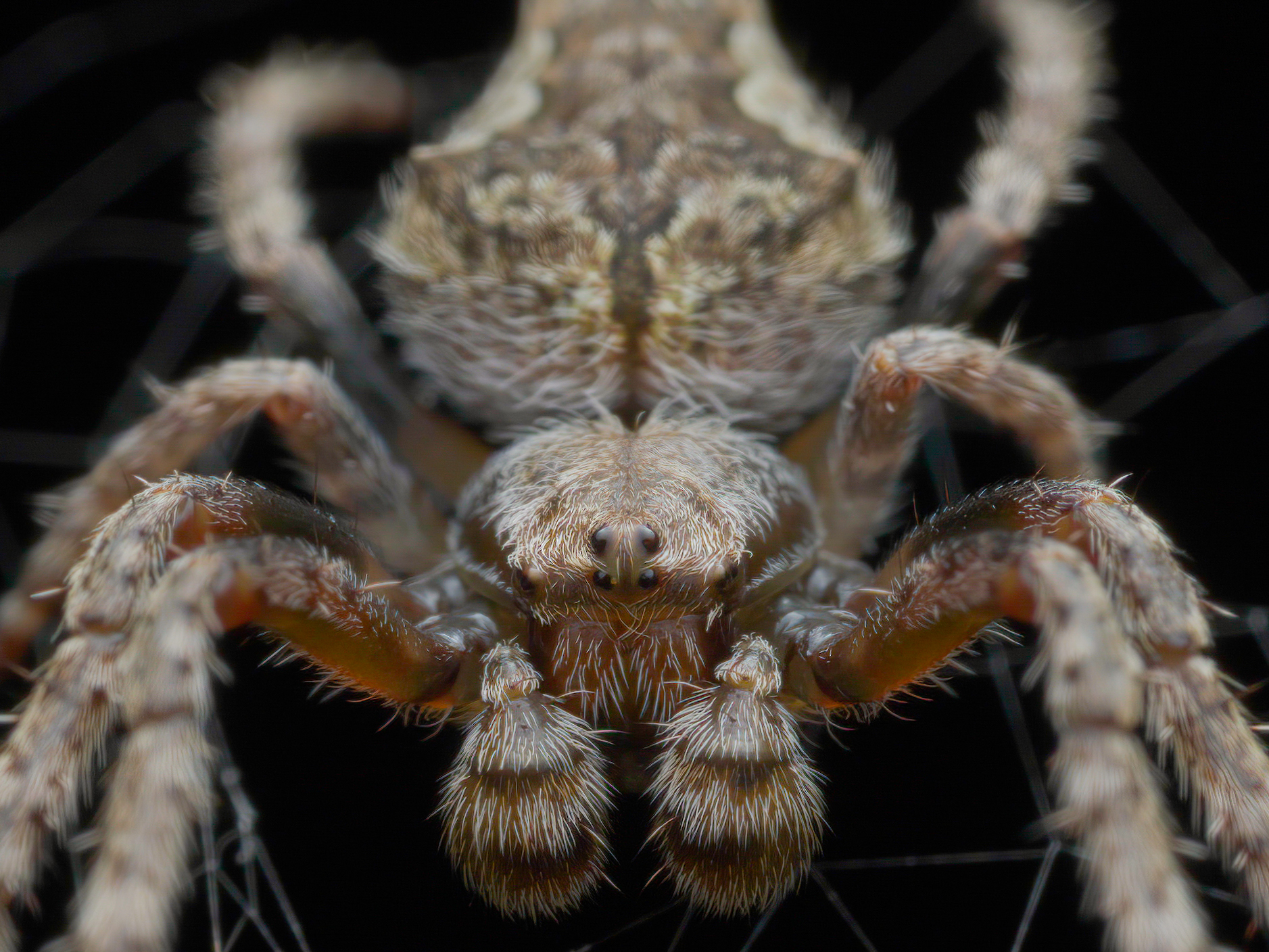

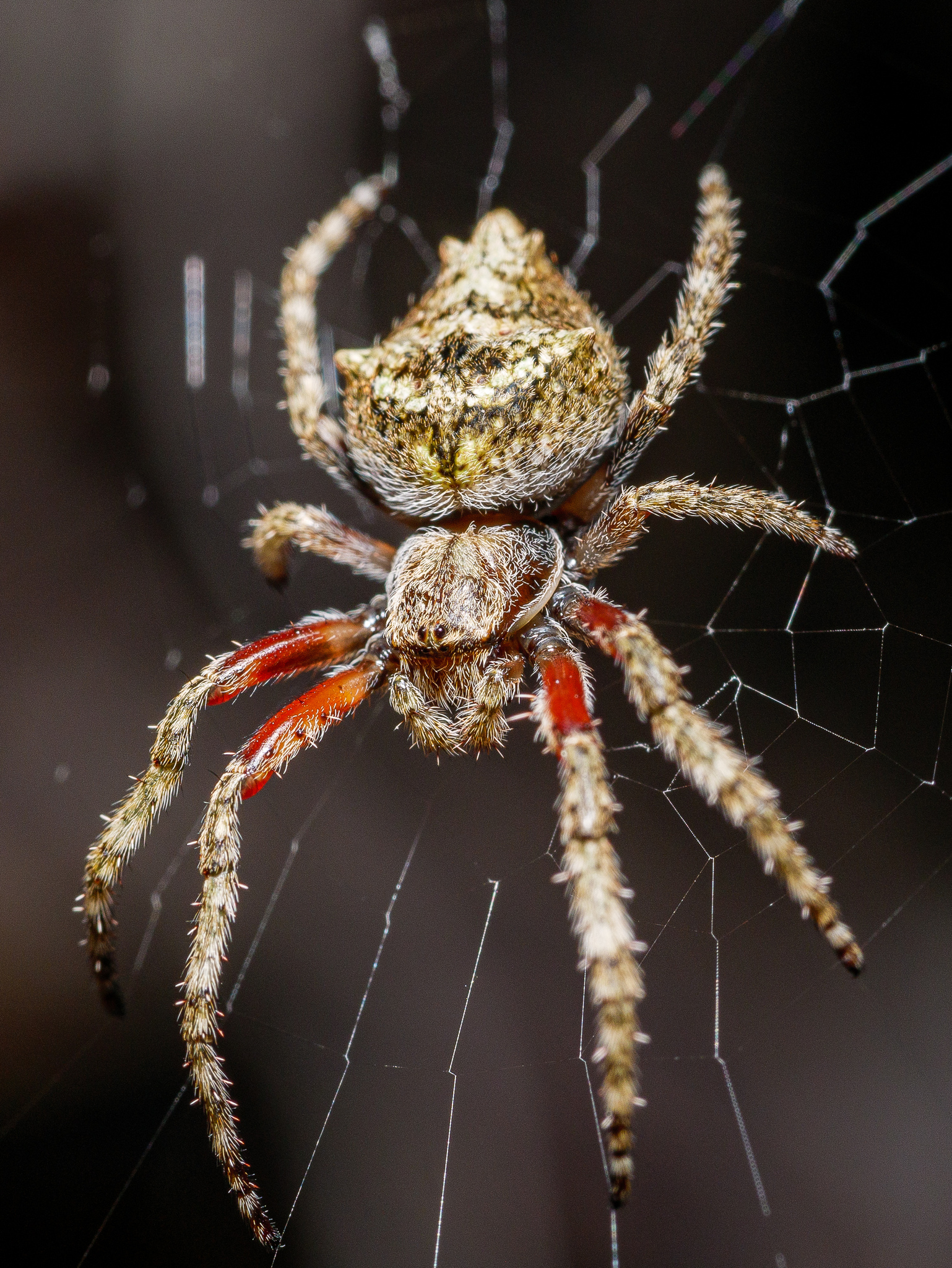

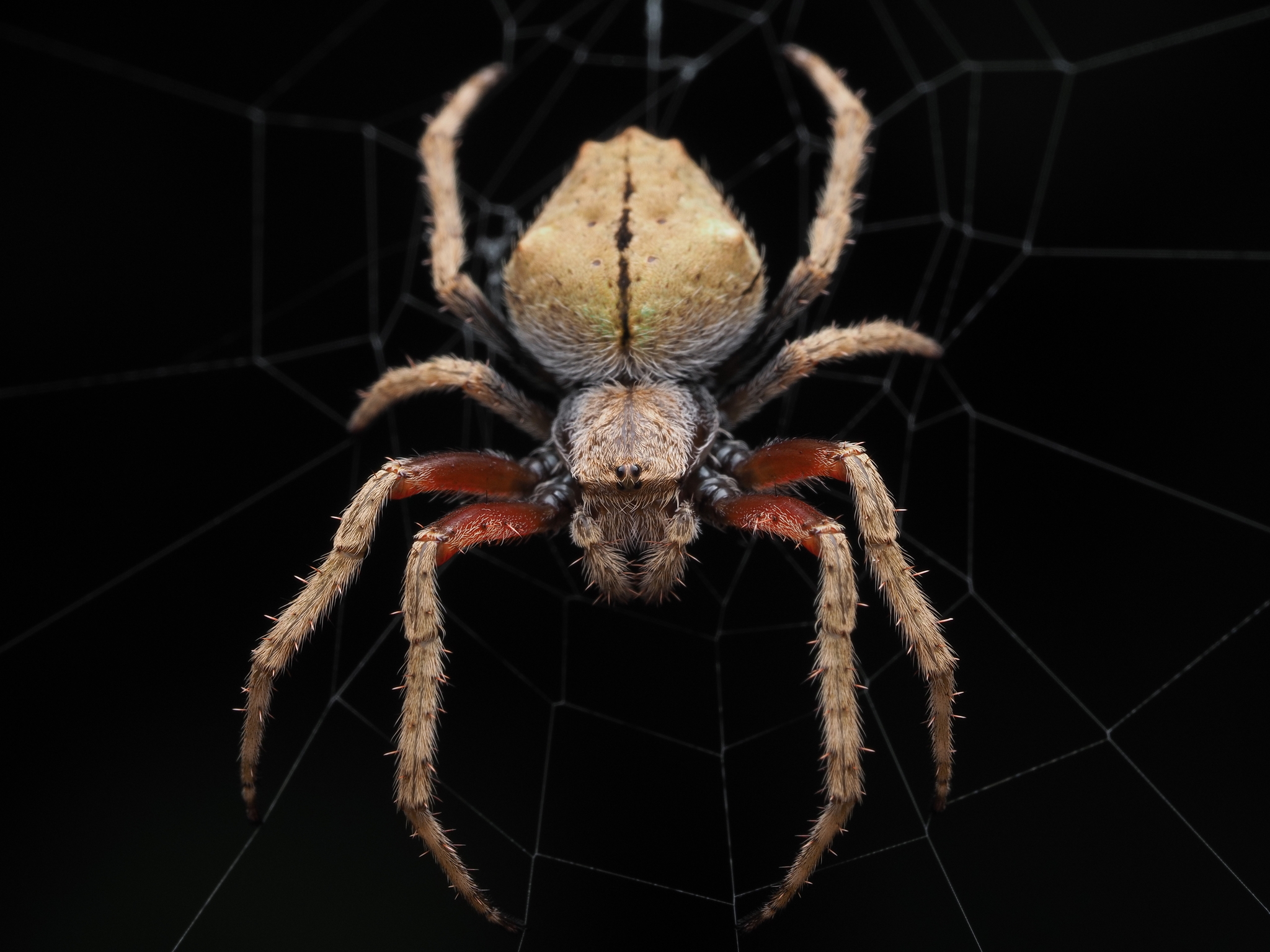

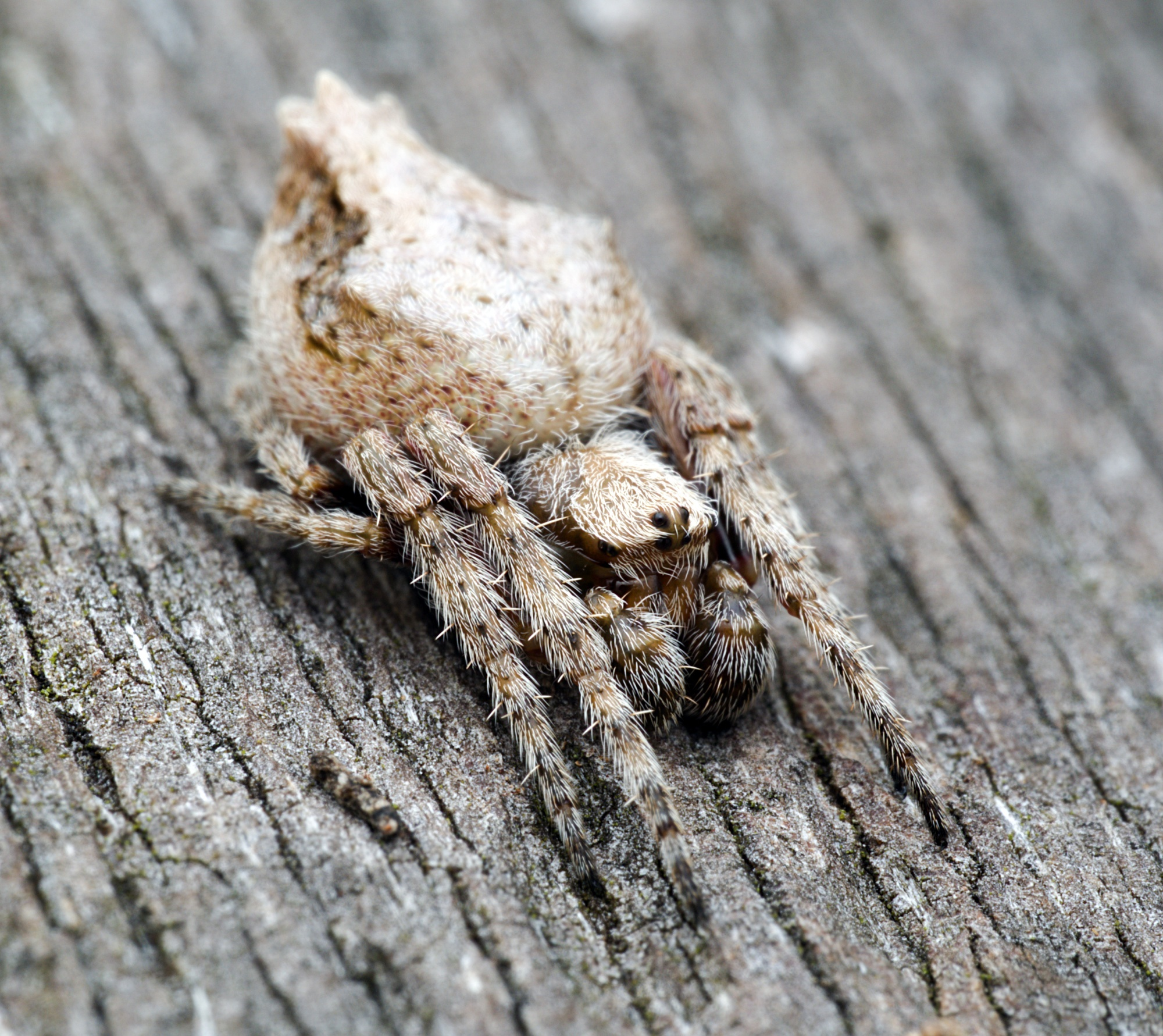

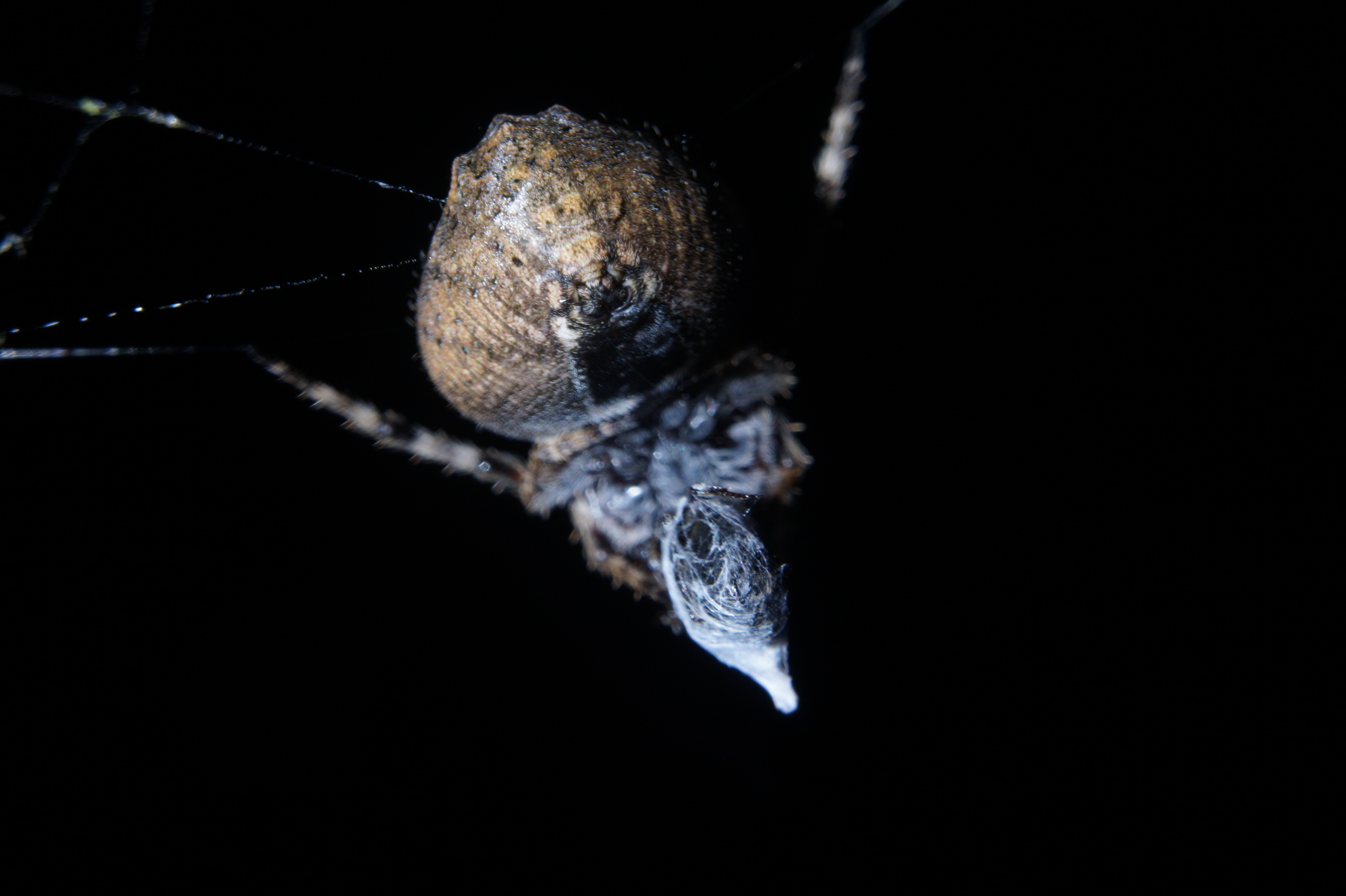
Spinneretes of a Knobbled Orbweaver captured during feeding.
