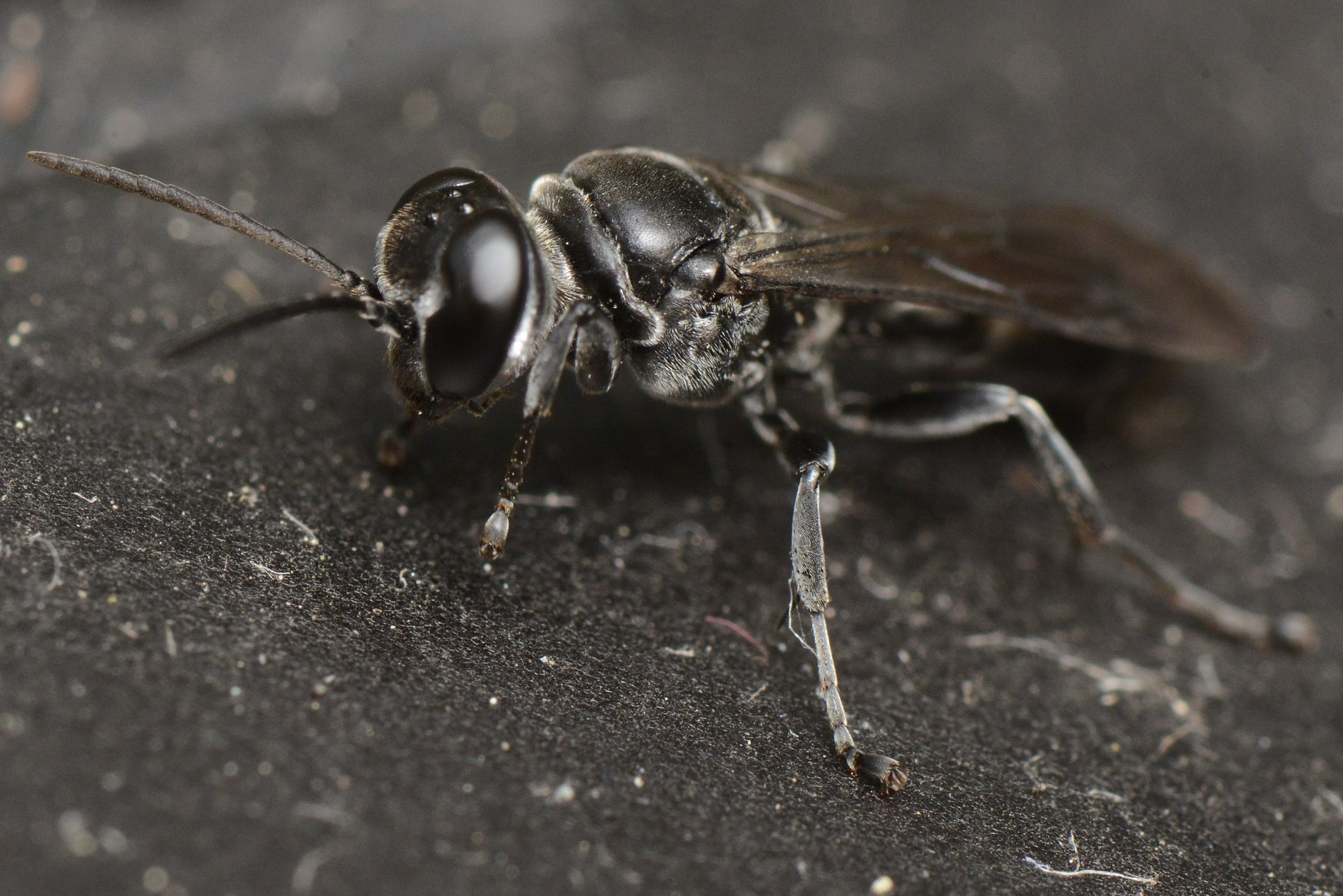

Scientific classification
- Domain: Eukaryota
- Kingdom: Animalia
- Phylum: Arthropoda
- Class: Insecta
- Order: Hymenoptera
- Family: Crabronidae
- Genus: Pison
- Species: P. morosum

Binomial name
- Pison morosum F. Smith, 1858

= Pison morosum =

Species of insect

Pison morosum is a solitary wasp of the family Crabronidae. It is the only endemic species of Pison wasp to New Zealand. It was first described by entomologist Frederick Smith in 1858.

== Description ==
The species has an entirely black body. Female specimens vary in length between 7.5 and 11.5 mm, and male specimens between 5.5 and 8.0 mm. It can be distinguished from Pison spinolae due to the lack of long erect hairs.

== Distribution ==
Pison morosum is found throughout the mainland of New Zealand, as well as the Chatham Islands to the east.

== Parasites ==
Similar to Pison spinolae, wasp pupae are hosts to Melittobia wasps.

== See also ==
- Pulawski, W.J. (2018). "A revision of the wasp genus Pison Jurine, 1808 of Australia and New Zealand, New Guinea and the Pacific islands (Hymenoptera: Crabronidae)". Proceedings of the California Academy of Sciences. 4. 56: 1–584.
