= Pison koreense =

Scientific classification
- Domain: Eukaryota
- Kingdom: Animalia
- Phylum: Arthropoda
- Class: Insecta
- Order: Hymenoptera
- Family: Crabronidae
- Tribe: Trypoxylini
- Genus: Pison
- Species: P. koreense

Binomial name
- Pison koreense (Radoszkowski, 1887)

Synonyms
- Paraceramius koreensis Radoszkowski, 1887

Species of wasp

Pison koreense is a species of square-headed wasp in the family Crabronidae. It is found in Europe and Northern Asia (excluding China), North America, and Southern Asia.
