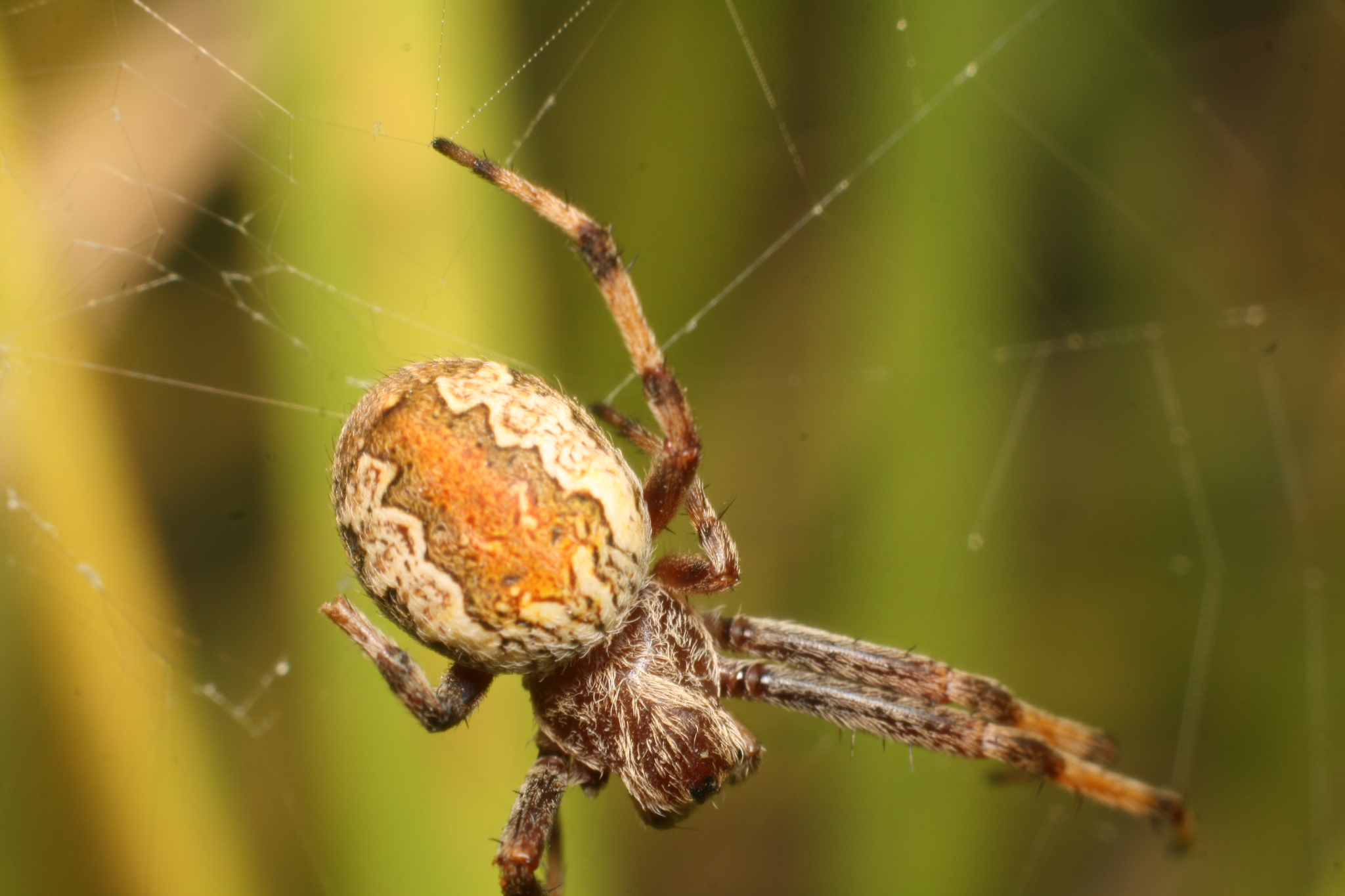
- Salsa fuliginata

Scientific classification
- Kingdom: Animalia
- Phylum: Arthropoda
- Subphylum: Chelicerata
- Class: Arachnida
- Order: Araneae
- Infraorder: Araneomorphae
- Family: Araneidae
- Genus: Salsa; Framenau & Castanheira, 2022

Type species
- Epeira fuliginata L. Koch, 1872

= Salsa (spider) =

Genus of orb-weaver spiders

Salsa is an Australasian genus of orb-weaver spiders.

== Description ==
Spiders of this genus have total length 3.2-6.1 mm (males) or 6.5–10.5 mm (females). The carapace ranges in colour from yellowish brown to reddish brown, and is normally covered with yellowish white setae. The dorsal surface of the abdomen is pale brown to beige and has a variable darker folium (leaf-like) pattern. The ventral surface is variable but is usually darkest in the middle and has lateral pale bands that may be elongate, ovoid, or spindle-like in shape.

Salsa can be distinguished from similar spider genera by the abdomen having a single posterior tubercle and ventral pale bands. In males, the pedipalp has a C-shaped median apophysis and teeth-like tubercles inside its basal arch. In females, the epigyne has a transparent scape that is generally shorter than the epigyne plate.

== Habitat ==
Salsa occur in a range of different habitats, including forests (rainforests, dry sclerophyll and open forest), lagoon vegetation, swamps and gardens.

== Species ==
Many of these species were previously assigned to other genera, such as Araneus, Cyclosa or Epeira.

- Salsa brisbanae
- Salsa canalae
- Salsa fuliginata
- Salsa neneba
- Salsa rescherchensis
- Salsa rueda
- Salsa tartara
