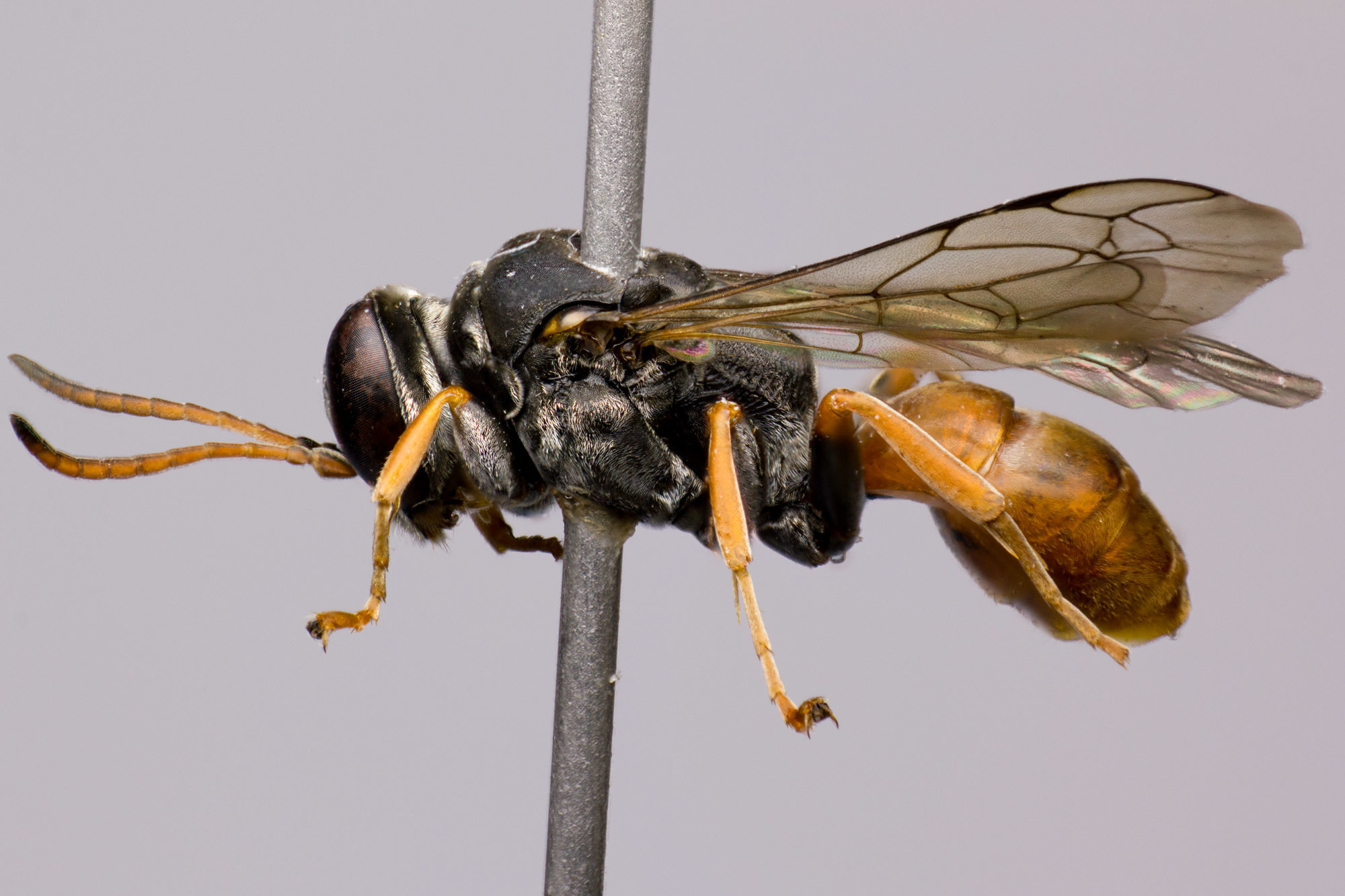

Scientific classification
- Kingdom: Animalia
- Phylum: Arthropoda
- Clade: Pancrustacea
- Class: Insecta
- Order: Hymenoptera
- Family: Crabronidae
- Genus: Pison
- Species: P. peletieri

Binomial name
- Pison peletieri Le Guillou, 1841

Synonyms
- Pison ruficorne Smith, 1856; Pison ruficornis Smith, 1856

= Pison peletieri =

Species of insect

Pison peletieri is a wasp of the family Crabronidae. It is endemic to Australia, and was introduced to New Zealand in 2001.

== Description ==
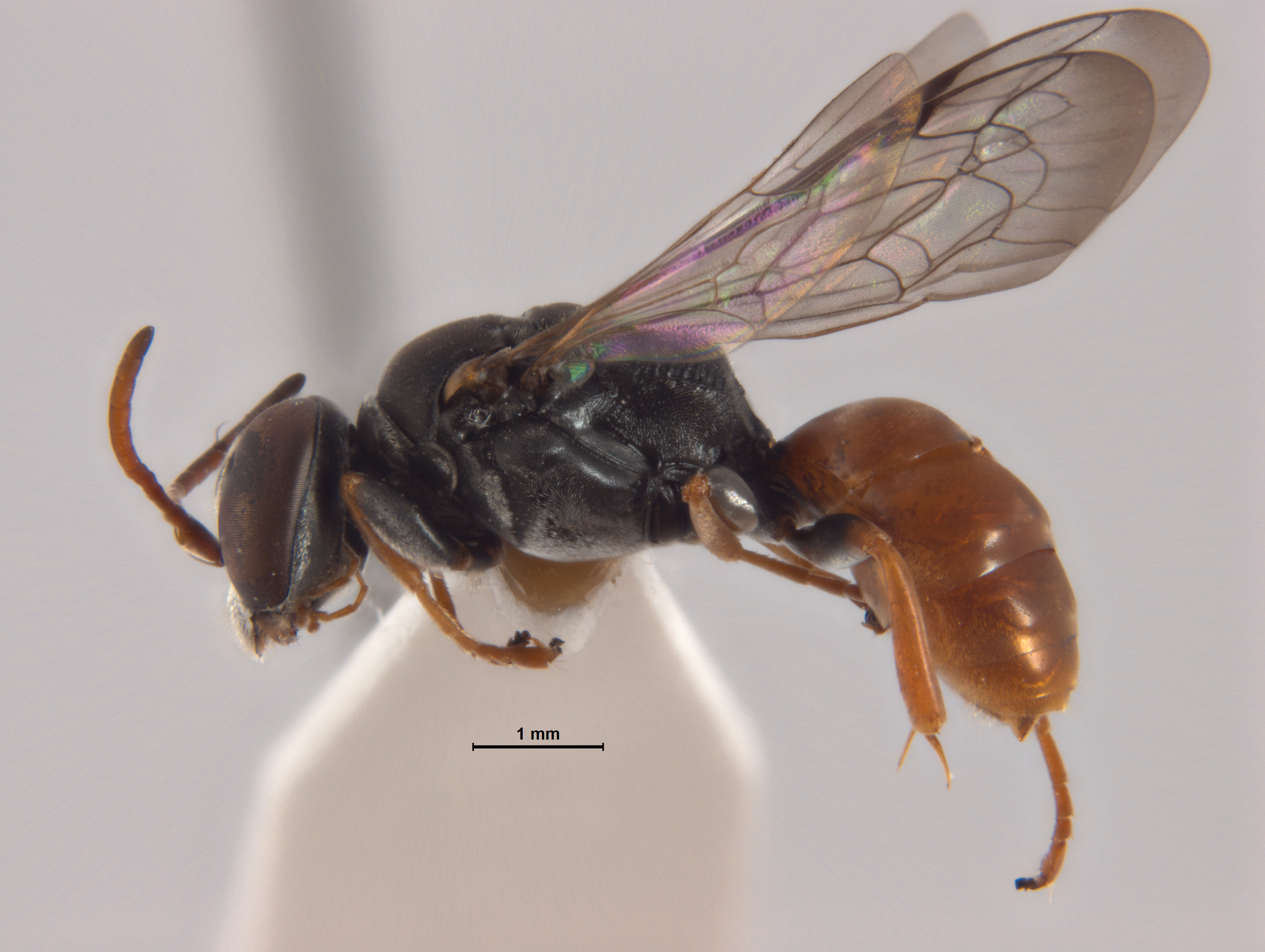
Lateral view of a female wasp

The species has a black head and mesosoma, while the metasoma, tibiae and leg tarsi are a red-brown colour.

Pison peletieri creates nests of cells formed from mud.

== Distribution ==
The species is found in all states of Australia except for Tasmania. Pison peletieri was first detected in Auckland, New Zealand in March 2001. As of 2022, the species has spread to Northland and the Waikato.

== See also ==
- Pulawski, W.J. (2018). "A revision of the wasp genus Pison Jurine, 1808 of Australia and New Zealand, New Guinea and the Pacific islands (Hymenoptera: Crabronidae)". Proceedings of the California Academy of Sciences. 4. 56: 1–584.
