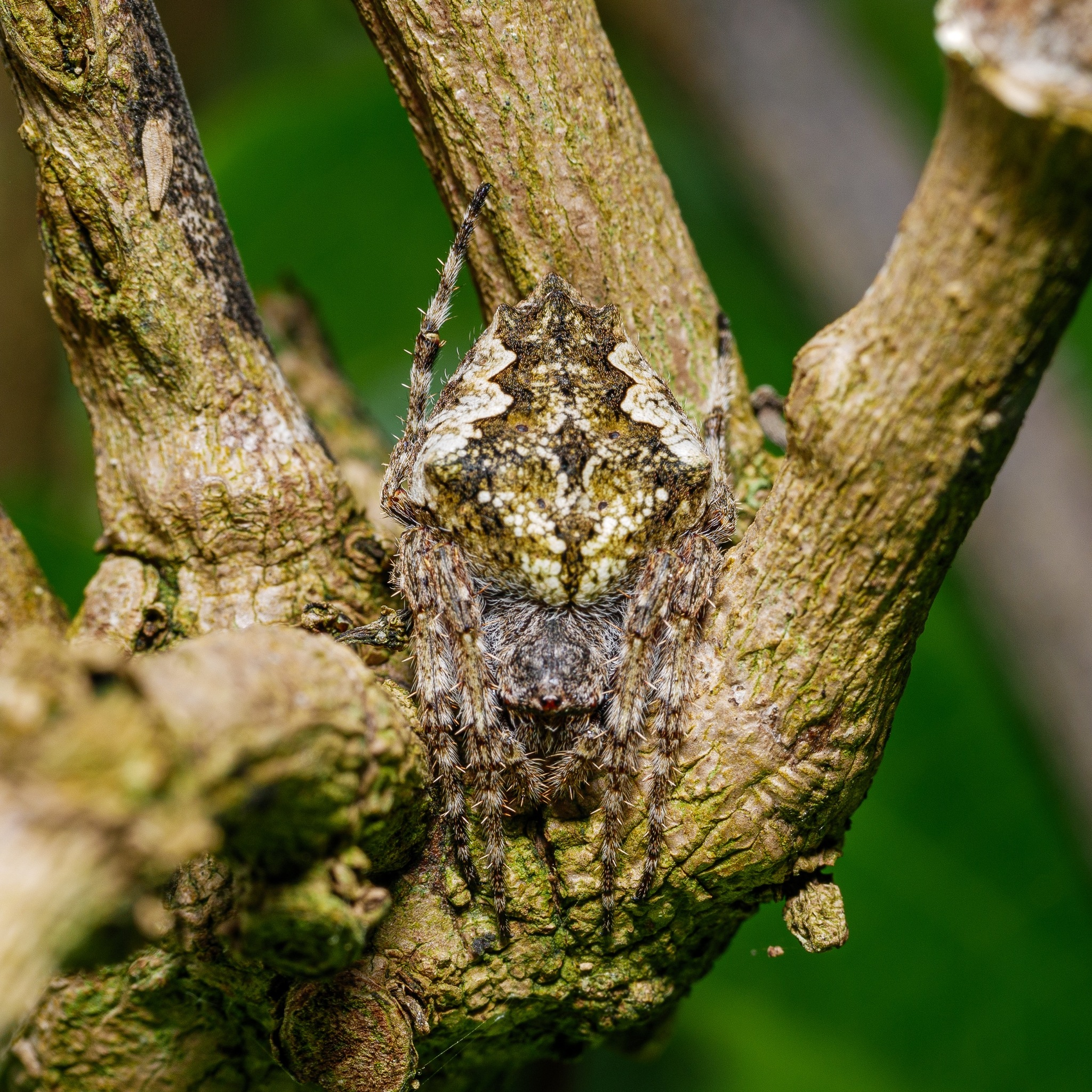
- Socca pustulosa (Walckenaer, 1841)

Scientific classification
- Kingdom: Animalia
- Phylum: Arthropoda
- Subphylum: Chelicerata
- Class: Arachnida
- Order: Araneae
- Infraorder: Araneomorphae
- Family: Araneidae
- Subfamily: Araneinae
- Genus: Socca; Framenau, Castanheira & Vink, 2022

Type species
- Socca pustulosa (Walckenaer, 1841)

= Socca (spider) =

Genus of orb-weaver spiders

Socca is an Australasian genus of orb-weaver spiders with known species in both Australia and New Zealand.

== Description ==
In an overview of morphological data, the genus was characterised by a diagnostic presence of five tubercles posteriorly on the abdomen, plus specific anatomical features of the male pedipalp, notably a tri-partite terminal apophysis. In mature females, the epigyne plate is about as wide as long and the scape elongate. Together, these features help differentiate Socca from other genera of orb-web spiders.

== Habitat ==
Socca occur in a range of different habitats.

== Species ==
A few species were previously assigned to other genera, such as Araneus or Epeira.

- Socca arena Framenau, Castanheira & Vink, 2022
- Socca australis Framenau, Castanheira & Vink, 2022
- Socca caiguna Framenau, Castanheira & Vink, 2022
- Socca elvispresleyi Framenau, Castanheira & Vink, 2022
- Socca eugeni Framenau, Castanheira & Vink, 2022
- Socca johnnywarreni Framenau, Castanheira & Vink, 2022
- Socca kullmanni Framenau, Castanheira & Vink, 2022
- Socca levyashini Framenau, Castanheira & Vink, 2022
- Socca pleia Framenau, Castanheira & Vink, 2022
- Socca pustulosa (Walckenaer, 1841)
- Socca senicaudata (Simon, 1908)
- Socca sydneyica (Keyserling, 1887)
