= Karl Vorse Krombein =

American entomologist

Karl Vorse Krombein (May 26, 1912 Buffalo, New York – September 6, 2005 Lorton, Virginia) was an American entomologist specializing in Hymenoptera. He worked for the USDA Agricultural Research Service from 1941-2003, and was based in the Entomology Department of the National Museum of Natural History.
