= Oktawiusz Radoszkowski =

Polish entomologist (1820–1895)

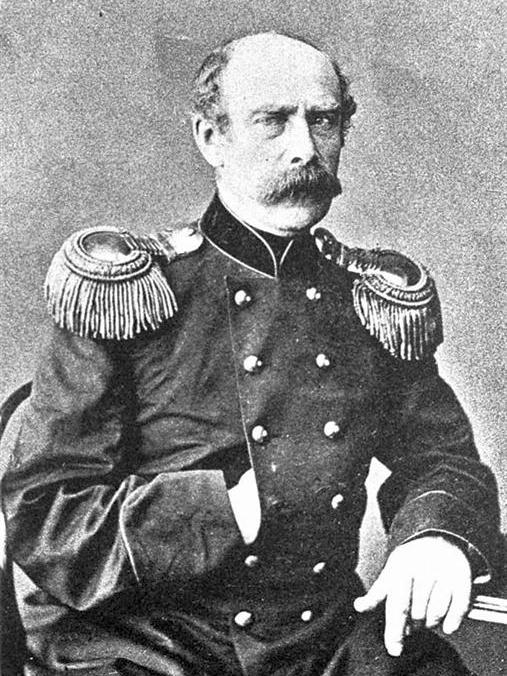

General Oktawiusz Wincenty Bourmeister-Radoszkowski (variously spelt as Radochkoowsky, Radoszkowski, Radoszkowsky etc. and in Polish sources as Oktavij Vikentij Burmejster-Radoškovski) (Russian: Октавий Иванович Радошковский; 7 August 1820 – 13 May 1895) was a Polish entomologist who specialised in Hymenoptera and worked in the Russian Empire. He was one of the founding members of the Russian Entomological Society. He published very many scientific papers describing new taxa and on the structure and taxonomic significance of the genitalia of Aculeate Hymenoptera.

== Biography ==
Radoshkovsky was born in Łomża in a noble family and was trained in the army, serving as an artillery officer who retired as a Lieutenant-General in 1879. He described numerous species of Chrysididae, many of which were collected by others such as Alexei Pavlovich Fedchenko (1844–1873). He served as a president of the Russian Entomological Society from 1865 to 1866. He died in Warsaw. Most of his specimens, nearly 40000 at the time of transfer, finally went to the Polish Academy of Sciences in Krakow, Jagellonian University and the Zoological Museum of Moscow University.

== Works ==
Partial list (later works):

- Révision des armures copulatrices des mâles Bombus. Bulletin de la Société impériale des Naturalistes de Moscou, 60: 51- (1884)
- Révision des armures copulatrices des mâles de Mutillides. Horae societatis entomologicae rossicae 19:3-49 (1885)
- Révision des armures copulatrices des mâles de la tribu des Chrysides. Horae soc. entom. ross. (1888/89)
- Genitalanhänge der Hymenopteren. Biol. Centralb. vol 9: 539 and 543-544 and vol 10: 221-222 (1889–91)
- Essai sur la classe des Sphégides d'après la structure des armures copulatrices, Bull soc impér des Nat de Moscou (1891)

== Other sources ==
- Anonym 1896 [Radoszkowski, O. I. B.] Trudy Russk. ent. Obsc. v S. Peterburge 30I-VI, Portrait.
- Bogdanov, A. P. 1888 Materialy dlja istorii nautschnoj i prikladnoj d'jatel'nosti v Rossii po zoologii i soprikasajuschtschimsja s' neju otrasljam' znanija, priimuschtschestvenno za posl'dneje tridcatipjatil'tie (1850–1887g.) Materialien zur Geschichte der wissenschaftlichen und angewandten Tätigkeit in Russland in der Zoologie und der angerenzenden Wissensgebiete vorwiegend in den letzten fünfundreißig Jahren (1850–1887)Izv. imp. Obshch. Ljubit. Estest. Antrop. Etnogr. 55(=Zool. 3).
- Essig, E. O. 1931 A History of Entomology. New York, Macmillan Company : VI+1-1029 735-737, Portrait
- Medvedev, G. S. 2000 [Radoszkowski, O. I. B.] Trudy Russk. ent. Obsc. 716-22, Portrait.
- Pesenko, Yu. A. & Astafurova, Yu. V. 2003 Annotated Bibliography of Russian and Soviet Publications on the Bees 1771 - 2002 (Hymenoptera: Apoidea; excluding Apis mellifera).Denisia 11 1-616, 532-533.
