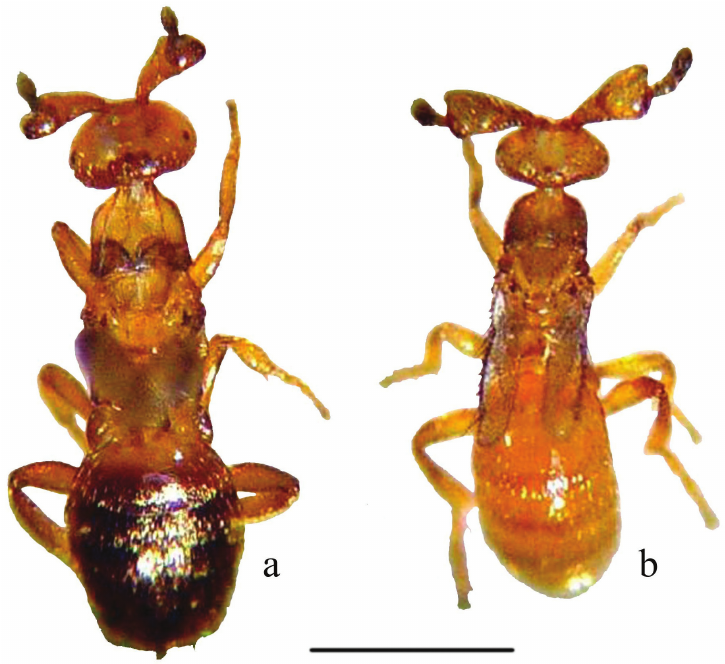
- male Melittobia acasta (left) male Melittobia australica (right)

Scientific classification
- Domain: Eukaryota
- Kingdom: Animalia
- Phylum: Arthropoda
- Class: Insecta
- Order: Hymenoptera
- Family: Eulophidae
- Subfamily: Tetrastichinae
- Genus: Melittobia; Westwood, 1848

Type species
- Melittobia acasta (Walker, 1839)

Species
- see Text

Synonyms
- Anthophorabia Newport, 1849; Philopison Cameron, 1908; Sphecophagus Brethes, 1910; Sphecophilus Brethes, 1910

= Melittobia =

Genus of wasps

Melittobia is a genus of hymenopteran insects of the family Eulophidae.

== Biology ==
Melittobia wasps are gregarious ectoparasitoids on solitary bees, honeybee and wasps, and also of any insect cohabitants of their hosts' nests, such as Coleoptera, Lepidoptera and Diptera. One species has been reared from puparia of Anastrepha fruit flies collected from fallen fruits in Mexico. They show intrasexual and intersexual dimorphism, with the males being blind and flightless and two castes of females, one long winged and one short winged, which are probably determined by nutrition. The females exhibit primitive social traits while the males are competitive, ferociously fighting and killing their male siblings. The males attract the females using a pheromone and they have an elaborate courtship ritual. They have a skewed sex ratio with 95% of the offspring being females which are from fertilised eggs but males are produced asexually through arrhenotoky. The females have overlapping adult generations and show close ties of kinship, parental care and altruistic cooperative escape behaviors. The best studied species from which most of the information about these wasps has been derived are Melittobia acasta, Melittobia australica and Melittobia digitata. These wasps are potentially economically harmful due to their lack of host specificity, fecundity, cryptic behaviour and behavioural flexibility. They have a rapid life cycle of 25 days. They breed well in the laboratory and are seen as potential model organisms in the study of genetics, developmental biology and ethology.

== Distribution ==
Melittobia is found throughout the world.

== Species ==
The following species are included in the genus Melittobia:

- Melittobia acasta (Walker, 1839)
- Melittobia assemi Dahms, 1984
- Melittobia australica Girault, 1912
- Melittobia bekiliensis Risbec, 1952
- Melittobia chalybii Ashmead, 1892
- Melittobia clavicornis (Cameron, 1908)
- Melittobia digitata Dahms, 1984
- Melittobia evansi Dahms, 1984
- Melittobia femorata Dahms, 1984
- Melittobia hawaiiensis Perkins, 1907
- Melittobia megachilis (Packard, 1864)
- Melittobia scapata Dahms, 1984
- Melittobia sosui Dahms, 1984
