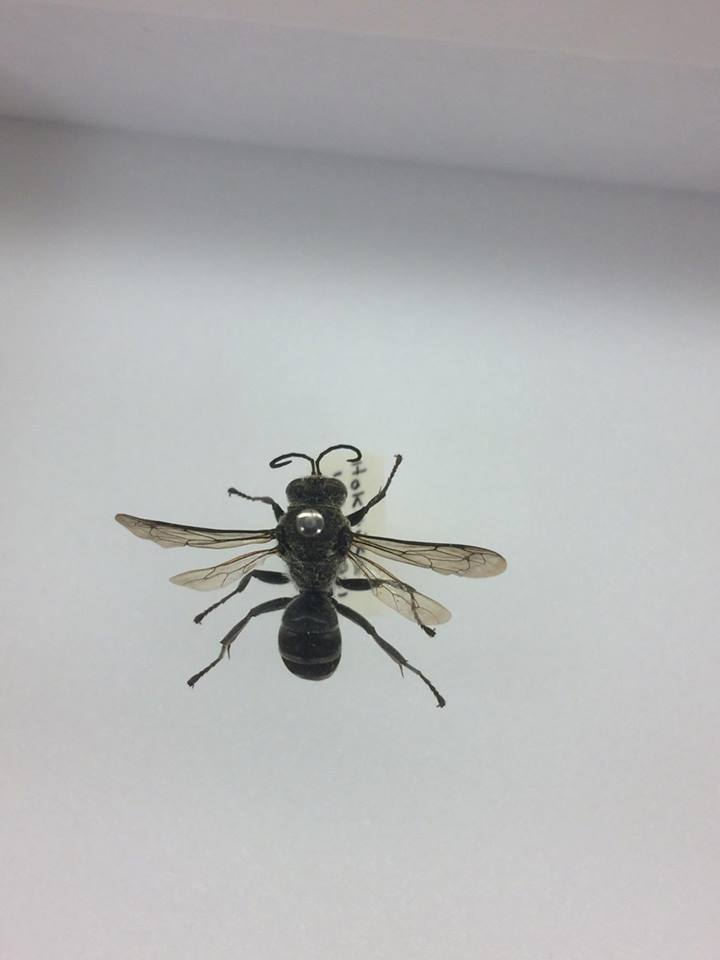

Scientific classification
- Kingdom: Animalia
- Phylum: Arthropoda
- Clade: Pancrustacea
- Class: Insecta
- Order: Hymenoptera
- Family: Crabronidae
- Genus: Pison
- Species: P. spinolae

Binomial name
- Pison spinolae Shuckard (1837)

= Pison spinolae =

Species of insect

Pison spinolae is a solitary wasp of the family Crabronidae, native to Australia and New Zealand.

== Description ==
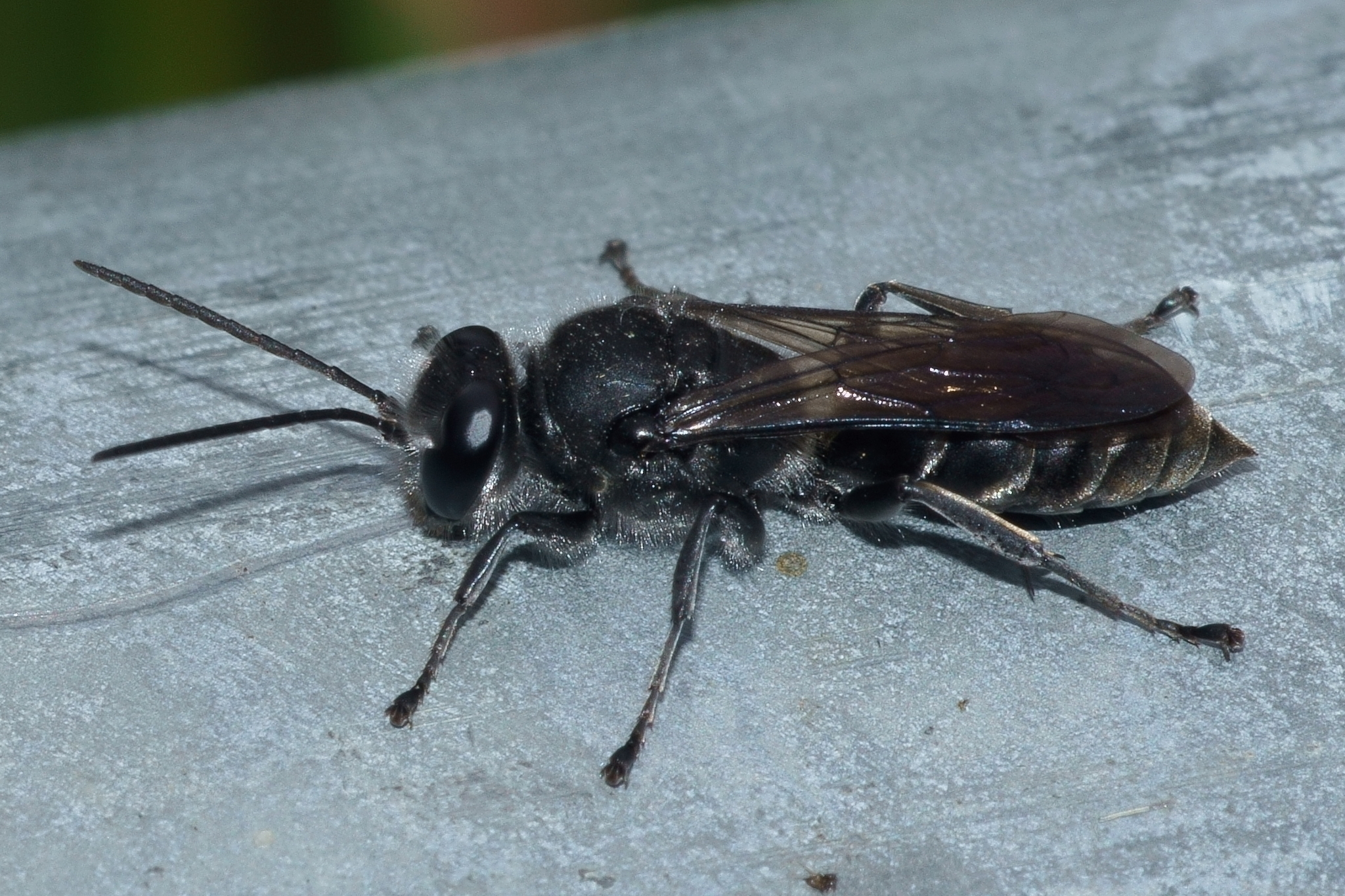
Pison spinolae, side view

Like all insects, P. spinolae has a hard exoskeleton, one pair of antennae and three pairs of legs. These legs are strong as they need to be able to carry spiders back to their nests for their young. It has a segmented body divided into three sections; head, thorax and abdomen and two pairs of wings. An easily identifiable feature of the mason wasp, similar to other wasp species is the thin waist between the thorax and abdomen. This helps to tell the difference between a wasp and bee. The mason wasp is able to use its stinger repeatedly unlike bees. It relies on this to inject venom into spiders which paralyses them and allows the adult female to carry the spider back to the nest. Unlike some commonly-known wasps, P. spinolae is not black and yellow, the adult's body is fully black and has a length of approximately 16 millimetres (0.63 in). The nest of the mason wasp is constructed from predominantly sand and mud. It is small in size and widely abundant, found in places such as cracks of buildings and keyholes. The most obvious characteristic used for identification is the multiple single compartments sealed off from each other. Each contains a paralysed spider and an offspring of the adult female. Understanding the features of the mason wasp nest make the Juvenile stages easier to identify. The egg of the mason wasp is a white elongated oval shape. Later this develops into larvae which are white with a distinctive head and a translucent cuticle. The larvae then form a cocoon which is cylindrical, grey and rounded at either end.

== Name ==
This species is known as the mason wasp in English, and in Māori as ngaro wīwī (written "ngaro wiwi", without macrons, in older sources). Ngaro is a generic Māori word for fly or wasp, and wīwī conveys walking to distant places (as in the phrase ki wīwī ki wāwā for going walkabout). This name is used for all the New Zealand hunting wasps in the families Eumenidae, Pompilidae, and Sphecidae, such as Priocnemis monachus and Tachysphex nigerrimus.

== Distribution ==
=== Natural global range ===
The genus Pison is abundant throughout tropical and temperate regions, mostly in the southern hemisphere. A large number of species are found in Australia. P. spinolae is native to Australia and is thought to have been introduced to New Zealand around 1880.

=== New Zealand range ===
The mason wasp is found widely throughout New Zealand. The abundance of this species is relatively common but not of significant abundance to cause drastic effects on its prey populations. It was accidentally introduced from Australia circa the year 1880. Despite being a non-native species, Pison spinolae is by far the most commonly found mason wasp in the country, meaning it has occasionally been called the New Zealand mason wasp.

=== Habitat preferences ===
Sand wasps have a diverse range of habitats, from sand dunes to nesting in cracks of buildings. P. spinolae, like other species in the genus Pison, construct nests in holes in wood, keyholes and even crevices on ships and aircraft. This allows humans to widely distribute the species without knowing.

== Life cycle/phenology ==
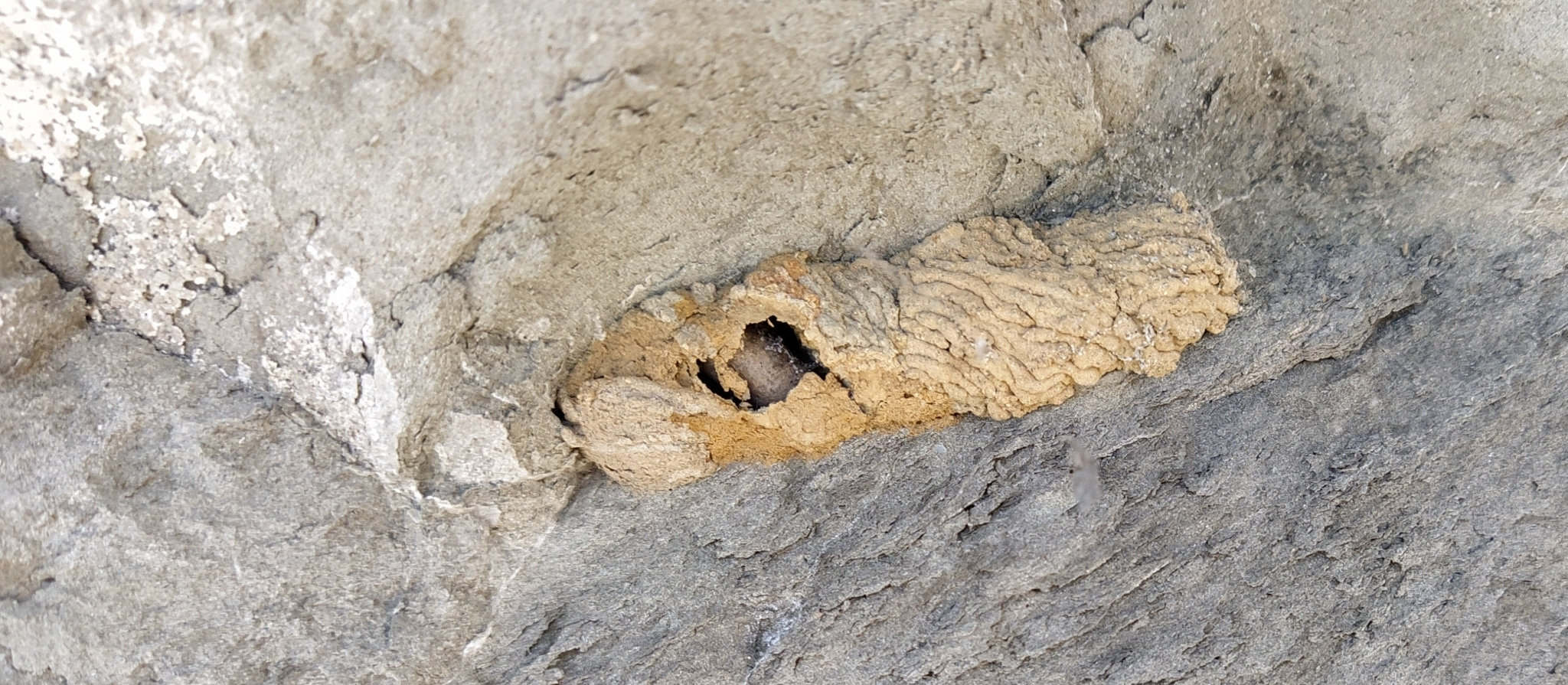
Pison spinolae nest

An egg is laid by the female adult which is a white elongated oval shape. This develops into larvae which are white with a distinctive head and a translucent cuticle. In less than three weeks the final larval stage is reached. The formation of the cocoon begins within one month after the egg was laid. The cocoon of the Pison genus are cylindrical, grey and rounded at either end. Unlike most New Zealand sphecids P. spinolae is bivoltine. This includes a summer generation without a diapause and a winter generation with diapause. All New Zealand species in the family Sphecidae spend at least the winter in a prepupal diapause. In the spring following the diapause the prepupa moults into an exarate pupa which is a pupal stage with moveable appendages. Pupal development occurs for 14 days and results in an adult wasp emerging. At the time of emergence solitary male wasps patrol nesting areas. This is when the females’ reproductive cycle is most sexually receptive. Most solitary wasp species will mate just once in their lives, this is generally at the time of emergence. Mating attempts have not been observed around feeding sites or other locations. It is not known if this mating behaviour is different in bivoltine species such as P. spinolae, where males of the first generation could possibly mate with females of both generations if they live long enough.

== Diet and foraging ==
Adult sand wasps obtain carbohydrates in the form of nectar from flowers and honeydew. Adult Pison wasps do not normally eat live prey although there have been rare observations of adults feeding on mosquitoes and other insects. This is not a common behaviour but possibly increases when nectar is scarce. The female wasps forage for spiders which are brought back to the nest for their young. The female paralyses the spiders via a sting and carries it back to the nest. It is placed in an individual compartment where the adult female lays an egg inside or on the spider. The compartment is then sealed off from other eggs using mud or dung. The paralysed spiders stays in the chamber and does not decay, the emerging larva then eats the spider for nutrients. Each compartment is adjacent to another egg and spider to create a large nest. Sealing off the eggs from each other is most likely done to prevent competition and ensure the young obtains sufficient food. P. spinolae and the smaller relative Pison morosum have similar preferences for prey including spiders which indicates that these species may compete for prey to some extent. Although little is known about this relationship, it could aid in understanding the foraging behaviour of P. spinolae.

== Predators, parasites, and diseases ==
P. spinolae is the primary host for Melittobia australica. M. australica has a wide geographic range although an individual will remain close to the host throughout its life cycle. The origin of M. australica is not yet known. Upon finding the host the adult female inserts her ovipositor to deposit her eggs into the host. This is generally done at the larval or pupal stage of the life cycle of P. spinolae. Melittobia clavicornis, is also a parasite of P. spinolae. It is the most common animal found in mason wasp nests. It is often found in the cocoon of P. spinolae at the pupal stage. Nests infested with M. clavicornis can have up to 50% mortality rate of P. spinolae. It is not known how M. clavicornis enters the cocoon. One predicted strategy is that once it has entered a nest with cocoons already formed it bores a hole through the cocoon to feed off the pupae. The second is that the adult lays its eggs on the larva before the cocoon is constructed. There have been many observations finding that cocoons often contain mites; Pyemotes ventricosus and Tyrophagus castellanii. Both mite species appeared to gain entrance through the holes formed by M. clavicornis. It is not known the effect these mites have on P. Spinolae.

== Other ==
The mason wasp is a solitary wasp meaning the adult lives on its own, not in colonies like honey bees. The female will spend most of her lifespan building a nest. Whilst doing this she makes a whining noise during the processing of the mud. After the female has laid her eggs there is no further maternal care given to the offspring. The paralysed spider in the nest is the only form of care provided for the emerging offspring. The male patrols the nest to wait for the emerging females so he can fertilise as soon as they leave the nest. After this there is no further courtship or interaction between mates. The adults are usually active during the day and in direct sunlight. Activity is very low in overcast conditions and rain
