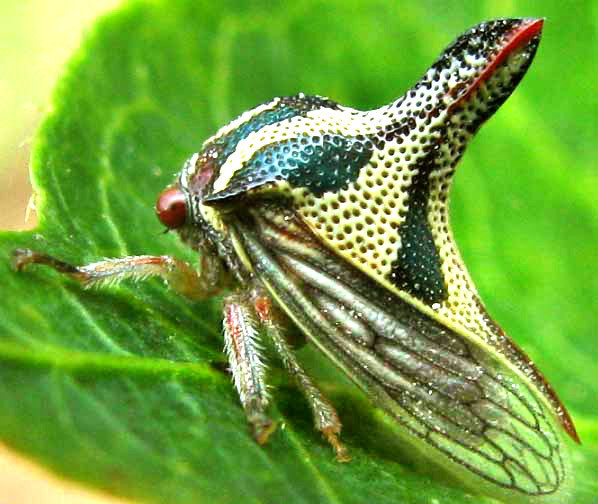

Scientific classification
- Kingdom: Animalia
- Phylum: Arthropoda
- Class: Insecta
- Order: Hemiptera
- Suborder: Auchenorrhyncha
- Family: Membracidae
- Genus: Umbonia
- Species: U. gladius

Binomial name
- Umbonia gladius Fairmaire, 1846

Synonyms
- Enchotype gladiolus (Fairmaire, 1846)

= Umbonia gladius =

Species of insect

Umbonia gladius is a species of treehopper occurring in the American tropics.

== Description ==
In common with other Umbonia species, Umbonia gladius displays these features:

- The top part of the prothorax, the pronotum, is as long as the abdomen, sometimes extending to the tips of the leathery front wings, the tegmina.
- The pronotum develops three pointed, or apical, parts.
- The pronotum bears a conspicuous, elevated horn
- The pointed projections along the sides of the pronotum, and near the front, (suprahumeral processes) are clearly distinguishable, but relatively blunter and shorter than in other genera.
- The sides don't slope like the sides of a roof (tectiform) as conspicuously as in other genera.
- The genus is similar to the genera Platycotis and Potnia, but the horn isn't directed forwards, and the space between the shoulders is wider.

The species Umbonia gladius further displays these special features:

- The pronotum's horn is erect, thin, flat, and rises perpendicularly, not curved toward the back.
- The pronotum's general color is ochreous.
- The pronotum is densely indented with coarse punctures.
- Males show a red streak on each side of the horn, which is nearly absent in females.
- The horn has a ridge (is carinated) and tipped with black.
- Legs are short and bear somewhat stiff hairs (hirsute).
- The bug is about 11mm long and 8 mm wide.

== Distribution ==
Umbonia gladius is relatively poorly documented. The iNaturalist map in 2025 showed locations of the species observed by citizen scientists in the southeastern Mexican state of Yucatán and in Honduras. A 1996 detailed study of Umbonia species, a "revision", mentions its presence in Venezuela.

== Behavior ==
As with other Umbonia species, females seem to prefer older males. Males attract females by clicking with their abdominal muscles. Males hop from plant to plant searching for mates while females stay together protecting and raising their young. Overall, Umbonia species are social, often remaining in the same general area throughout their lifespan, though males are more solitary than females.

== Taxonomy ==
In 1846 when Umbonia gladius was first formally described (as Enchotype gladius) by Léon Fairmaire, he associated the species with the location "Campêche", which in 1846 was part of the Republic of Yucatán, separate from Mexico. In Buckton's 1903 monograph of the Membracidae he gives the "habitat" as "Valladolid, Yucatan, Campeachy".

In Fairmaire's 1846 description in French of the species this is to be seen: "coll. Guérin" surely meaning "in the collection of French entomologist Félix Édouard Guérin-Méneville" upon which the description was based.

In the 1996 revision of Umbonia by Creão-Duarte and Sakakibara it's stated that Umbonia gladius is very close to Umbonia crassicornis, differing in the top horn being a little broader at the top than the base – "sub-spatulate". It's suggested that U. gladius may be only a variation of U. crassicornis.

== Etymology ==
The genus name Umbonia may be rooted in the word "umbo", which sometimes is used to designate the shield boss – the raised area at the center of warrior shields of antiquity – meant to deflect blows away from the shield's center. The horns atop Umbonia species are vaguely similar to such raised areas.

The species name gladius may be a New Latin borrowing from the name of the historical Roman sword about two feet long, used by gladiators, and in the Latin of that time called the gladius.
