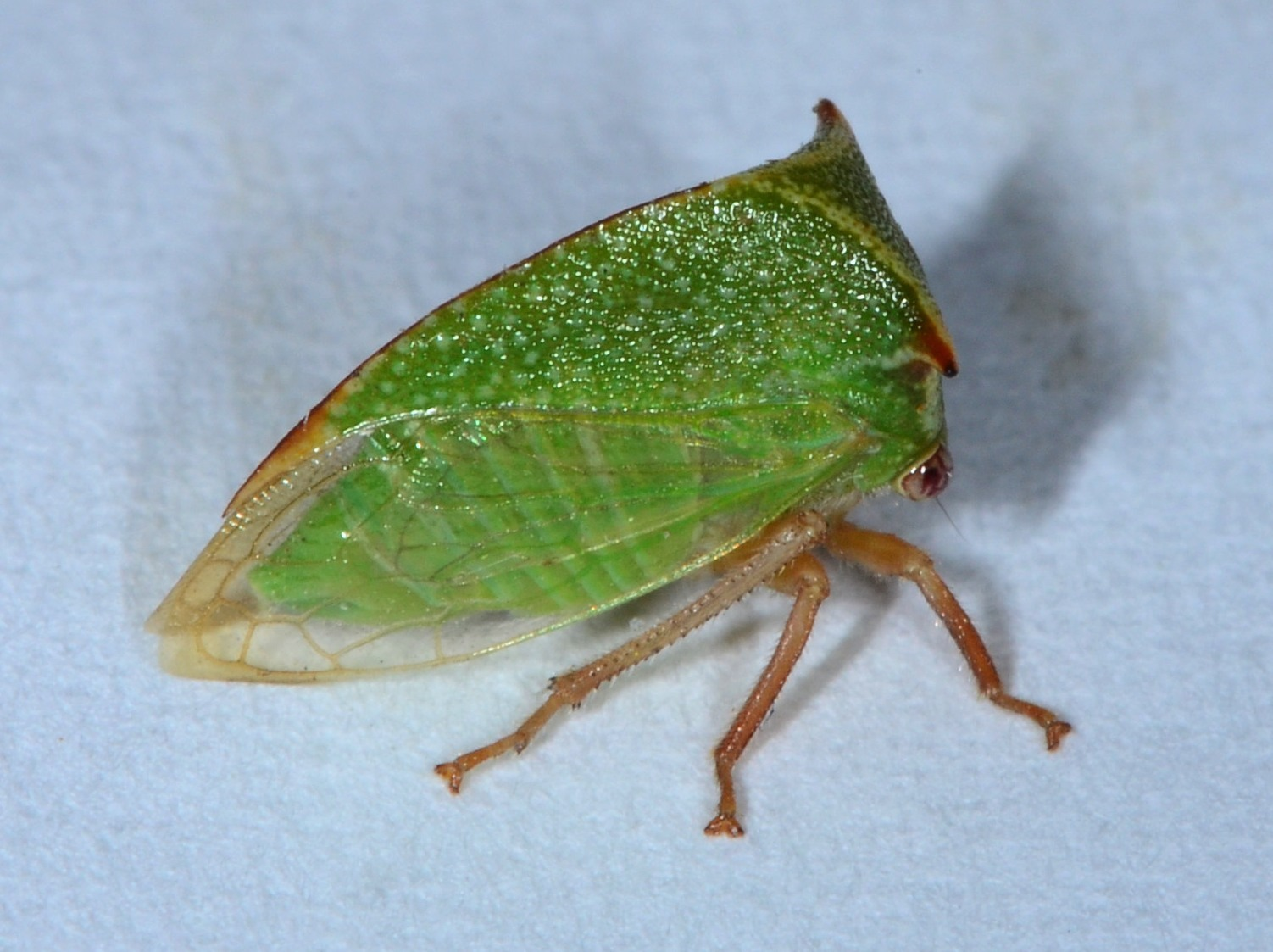
- Stictocephala alta

Scientific classification
- Kingdom: Animalia
- Phylum: Arthropoda
- Class: Insecta
- Order: Hemiptera
- Suborder: Auchenorrhyncha
- Family: Membracidae
- Subfamily: Smiliinae
- Genus: Stictocephala
- Species: S. alta

Binomial name
- Stictocephala alta (Walker, 1851)

= Stictocephala alta =

Species of true bug

Stictocephala alta is a species of treehopper in the family Membracidae.
