= Umbonia spinosa =

- Umbonia spinosa

Scientific classification
- Kingdom: Animalia
- Phylum: Arthropoda
- Class: Insecta
- Order: Hemiptera
- Suborder: Auchenorrhyncha
- Family: Membracidae
- Genus: Umbonia
- Species: U. spinosa

Binomial name
- Umbonia spinosa (Fabricius, 1775)

Species of treehopper

Umbonia spinosa is a species of treehopper native to South America. It belongs to the Membracidae family.

== Morphology ==
Color variation in U. spinosa

Umbonia spinosa can be distinguished from other members of its genus by the appearance of its elongated pronotum, or dorsal horn. The dorsal horn is located between or just behind its humerals and they possess a short metopidium. The dorsal horn itself is straight and the base of the plate is yellow, testaceous or pale green, with red or yellow vittae (stripes) at each side, though sometimes U. spinosa can be characterized by black vittae. It also has an interesting egg survival technique, where “females dig the nest, [...] during the nesting cycle”. The dorsal horn gradually tapers to a point from base to summit, similar to a thorn in appearance.

== Distribution and diet ==
Umbonia spinosa has been found in South and Central America, Mexico, and southern Florida. In general, they tend to reside in more subtropical environments. In Central America, they congregate on the branches of the Persian silk tree (Albizia julibrissin) for mating and overwintering, and are also found on the bean tree (Inga edulis). Female Umbonia spinosa uses those trees to lay their eggs in by making round holes in them. The trees are also used as a source of food, the Umbonia spinosa uses its mouth parts to ingest sap from the trees.

== Relationship with humans ==
The juvenile form of Umbonia spinosa is historically considered edible by the indigenous peoples of South America, while their spines are still soft after molting.

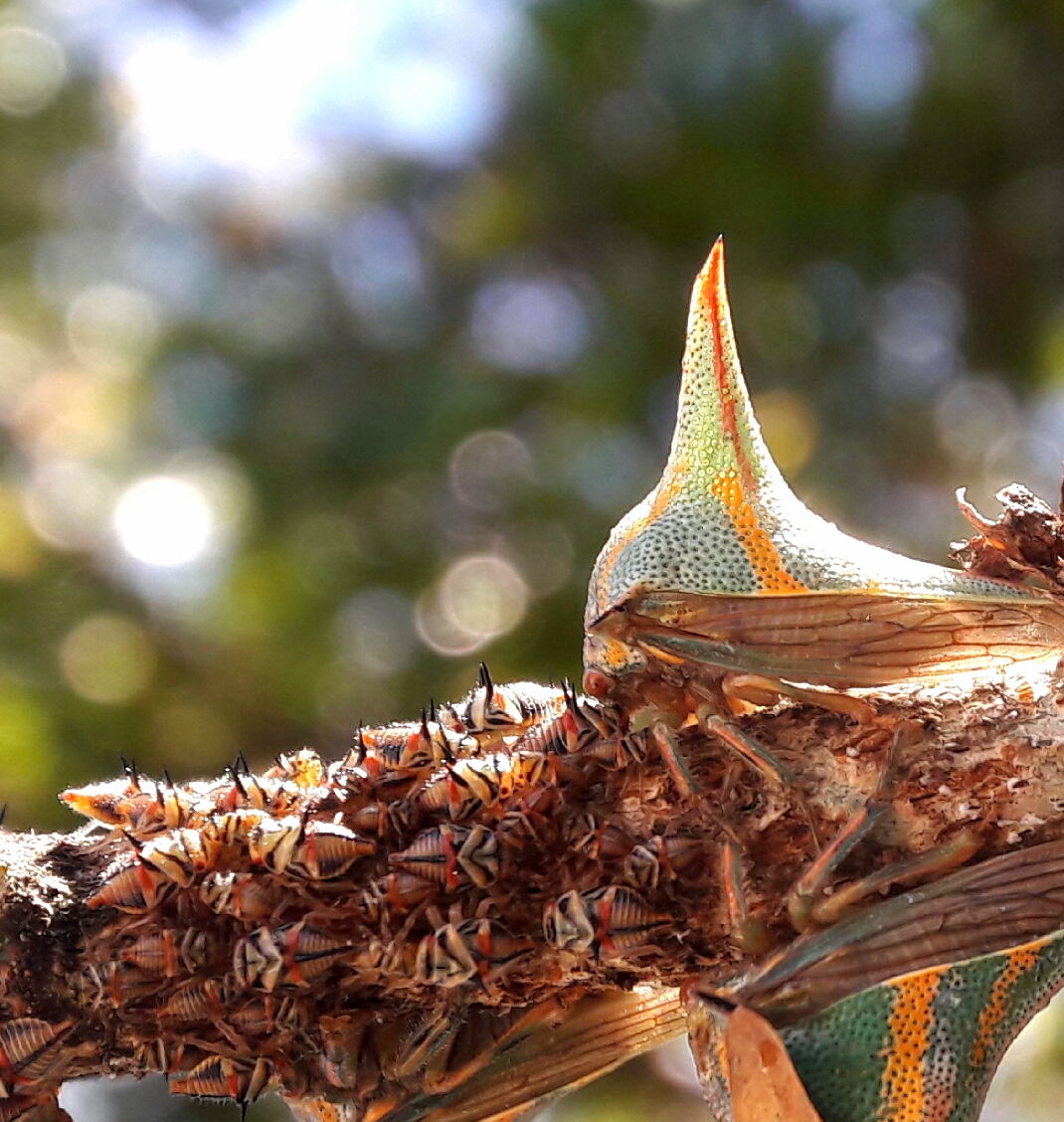
U. spinosa guarding nimphs
