= Iria =

Scientific classification
- Domain: Eukaryota
- Kingdom: Animalia
- Phylum: Arthropoda
- Class: Insecta
- Order: Hemiptera
- Suborder: Auchenorrhyncha
- Family: Membracidae
- Tribe: Heteronotini
- Genus: Iria; Stål, 1867

Genus of insects

Iria is a genus of central and South American treehoppers in the tribe Heteronotini, erected by Carl Stål in 1867.

== Species ==
BioLib includes:

1. Iria carinata Walker, 1851
2. Iria lethierryi Funkhouser, 1927
3. Iria maculinervis Stål, 1862
4. Iria pilosella Stål, 1862
5. Iria stictica Stål, 1862
