= Nicomia =

Scientific classification
- Domain: Eukaryota
- Kingdom: Animalia
- Phylum: Arthropoda
- Class: Insecta
- Order: Hemiptera
- Suborder: Auchenorrhyncha
- Family: Membracidae
- Subfamily: Nicomiinae
- Genus: Nicomia; Stål, 1858

Genus of an insect

Nicomia is a genus of treehoppers belonging to the subfamily Nicomiinae.

== Distribution ==
Species of the genus Nicomia are found in Central America and South America.

== Taxonomy ==
Nicomia contains the following species:

- Nicomia buccina Albertson, 2005
- Nicomia harenosa Albertson, 2005
- Nicomia inscripta Albertson, 2005
- Nicomia interrupta Stål, 1858
- Nicomia jucunda Albertson, 2005
- Nicomia lemniscata Stål, 1858
- Nicomia monticola Albertson, 2005
- Nicomia nigrifasciata Albertson, 2005
- Nicomia notidana Albertson, 2005
- Nicomia pulchella Albertson, 2005
- Nicomia serrata Albertson, 2005
- Nicomia subfasciata Stål, 1862
