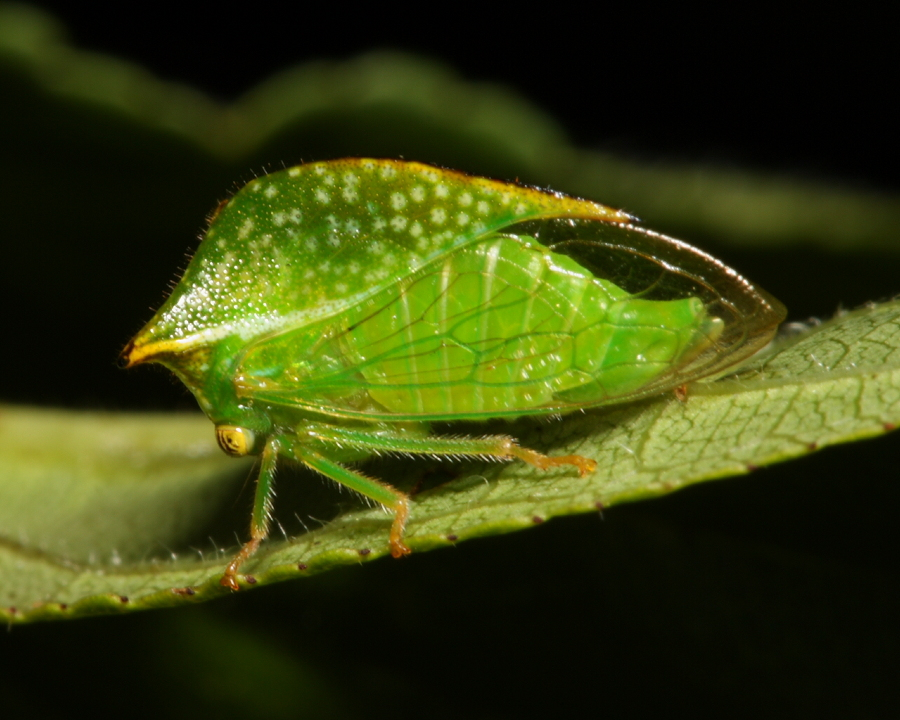
- Stictocephala taurina

Scientific classification
- Kingdom: Animalia
- Phylum: Arthropoda
- Clade: Pancrustacea
- Class: Insecta
- Order: Hemiptera
- Suborder: Auchenorrhyncha
- Infraorder: Cicadomorpha
- Superfamily: Membracoidea
- Family: Membracidae
- Subfamily: Smiliinae
- Genus: Stictocephala; Stål, 1869

= Stictocephala =

Genus of true bugs

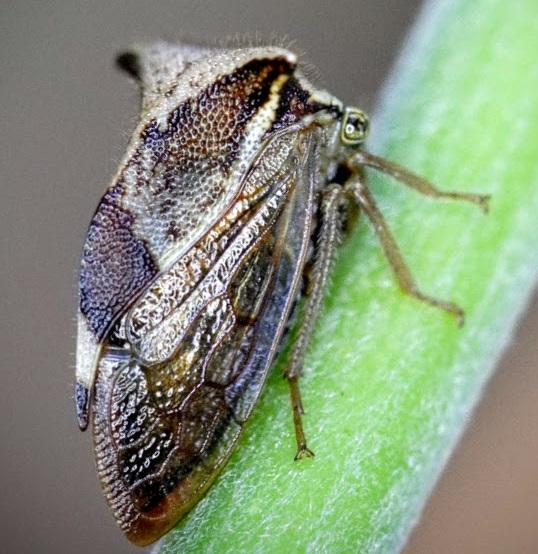
Two-horned Treehopper(Stictocephala diceros)

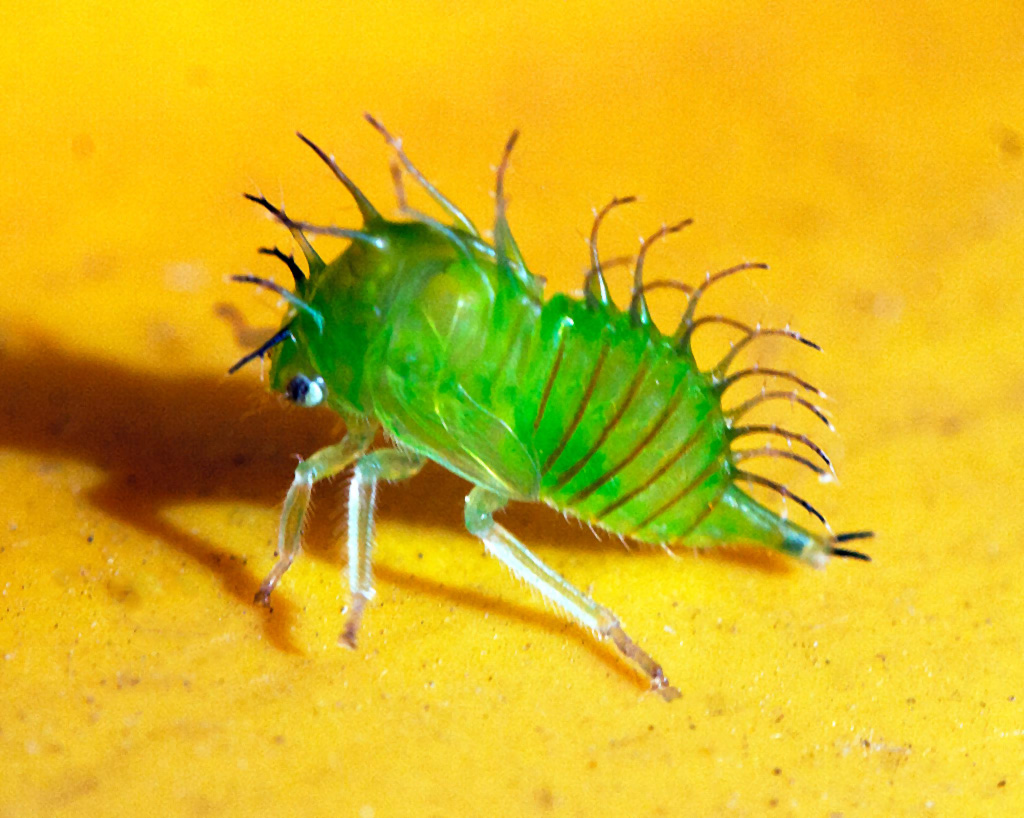
Tree hopper nymph Stictocephala spp.

Stictocephala is a genus of treehoppers in the family Membracidae; in the subfamily Smiliinae and tribe Ceresini. Species appear to be distributed mostly in North America, but S. bisonia has become widely distributed in Europe.

== Species ==
The Catalogue of Life lists:

- Stictocephala albescens
- Stictocephala alta
- Stictocephala basalis
- Stictocephala bisonia
- Stictocephala brevicornis
- Stictocephala brevis
- Stictocephala brevitylus
- Stictocephala diceros
- Stictocephala diminuta
- Stictocephala lutea
- Stictocephala militaris
- Stictocephala nervosa
- Stictocephala ornithisca
- Stictocephala palmeri
- Stictocephala stimulea
- Stictocephala substriata
- Stictocephala taurina
- Stictocephala tauriniformis
