= Stalomia =

Scientific classification
- Domain: Eukaryota
- Kingdom: Animalia
- Phylum: Arthropoda
- Class: Insecta
- Order: Hemiptera
- Suborder: Auchenorrhyncha
- Family: Membracidae
- Subfamily: Nicomiinae
- Genus: Stalomia; Albertson, 2005
- Species: S. veruta

Binomial name
- Stalomia veruta Albertson, 2005

Genus of insects

Stalomia is a genus of treehoppers belonging to the subfamily Nicomiinae. It contains the single species, Stalomia veruta. It is found in South America.
