= Polynema striaticorne =

Scientific classification
- Kingdom: Animalia
- Phylum: Arthropoda
- Class: Insecta
- Order: Hymenoptera
- Family: Mymaridae
- Genus: Polynema
- Species: P. striaticorne

Binomial name
- Polynema striaticorne Girault, 1911

Species of insect

Polynema striaticorne is a species of fairyfly. It parasitizes the eggs of the Buffalo treehopper.
