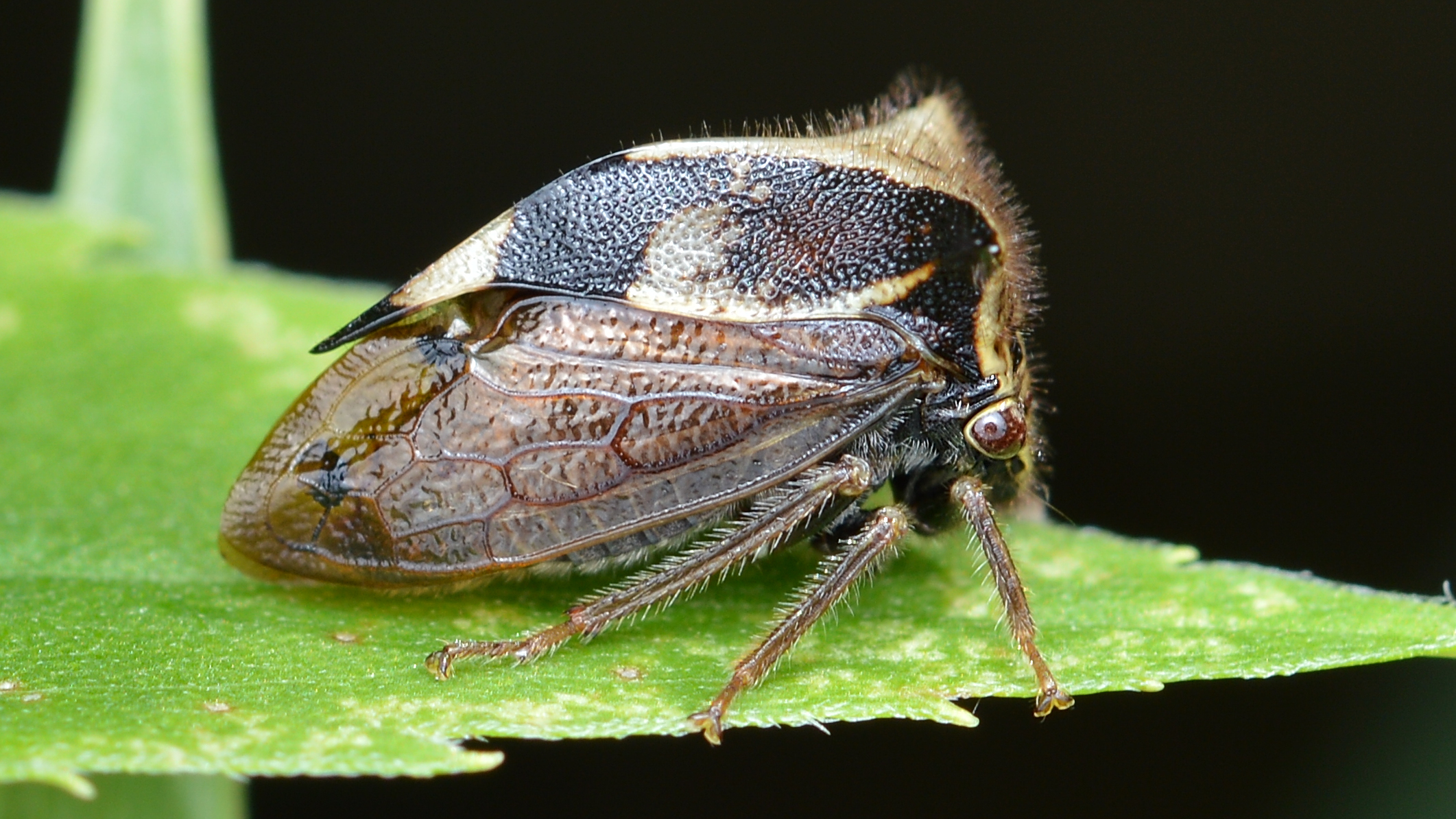

Scientific classification
- Domain: Eukaryota
- Kingdom: Animalia
- Phylum: Arthropoda
- Class: Insecta
- Order: Hemiptera
- Suborder: Auchenorrhyncha
- Family: Membracidae
- Genus: Stictocephala
- Species: S. diceros

Binomial name
- Stictocephala diceros (Say, 1824)

Synonyms
- Ceresa diceros (Say, 1824)

= Stictocephala diceros =

Species of hemipteran insect

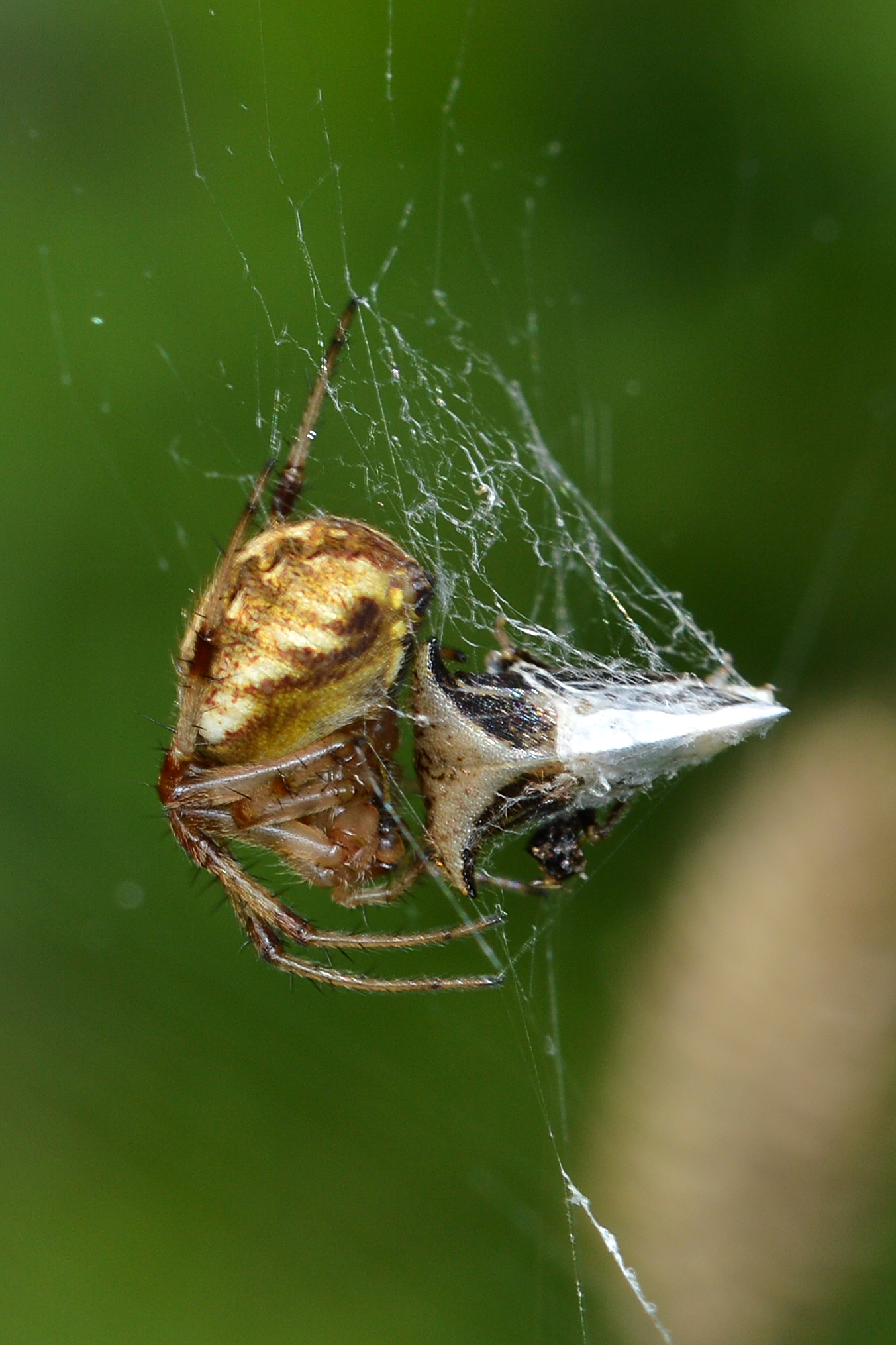
S. diceros caught in the web of an Neoscona arabesca.

Stictocephala diceros, the two-horned treehopper, is a species of hemipteran insect within the family Membracidae. The species range includes much of eastern North America, which includes southeastern Canada in areas adjacent the United States border and US state regions such as the Midwest, Northeast, Southeast, as well as some western states such as Utah, Colorado, and New Mexico. The species inhabits temperate and hardwood forests, where it primarily feeds on American black elderberry, although its known to feed on other flowering plants such as those in the Asteraceae, Fabaceae, Fagaceae, and Rosaceae families. The species reaches 8 to 9 millimeters in length with a brown coloration.
