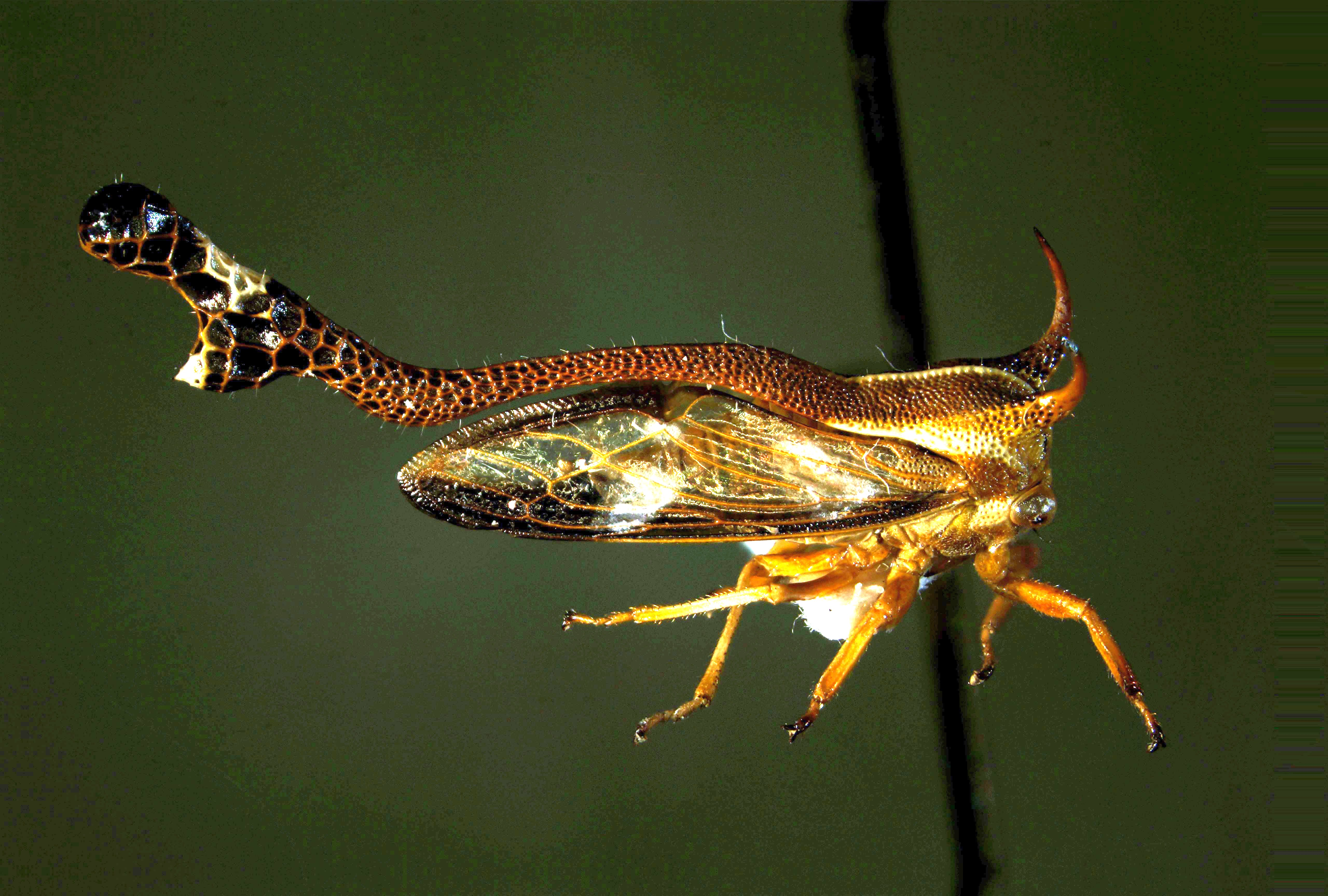
- Heteronotus delineatus

Scientific classification
- Domain: Eukaryota
- Kingdom: Animalia
- Phylum: Arthropoda
- Class: Insecta
- Order: Hemiptera
- Suborder: Auchenorrhyncha
- Family: Membracidae
- Subfamily: Heteronotinae
- Genus: Heteronotus; Laporte, 1832

= Heteronotus =

Genus of insects

Heteronotus is a genus of treehoppers belonging to the subfamily Heteronotinae, of which it is the type genus. It was first described by François Laporte in 1832.

== Description ==
Most species of Heteronotus have an appearance mimicking ants and wasps, with hollow bulbs and spikes. In some cases, the pronotum stretches beyond the wings.

== Distribution ==
Species of Heteronotus are found across Central and South America, stretching from Mexico to Argentina.

== Species ==
Heteronotus contains 44 species:

- Heteronotus abbreviatus Fairmaire, 1846
- Heteronotus abcisus Walker, 1851
- Heteronotus aethiops (Butler, 1878)
- Heteronotus albopunctus Boulard, 1980
- Heteronotus albospinosus Haviland, 1925
- Heteronotus anthracinus Strümpel, 1988
- Heteronotus apricarius Strümpel, 1988
- Heteronotus armatus Laporte, 1832
- Heteronotus belliger (Butler, 1878)
- Heteronotus bicornis (Lesson, 1832)
- Heteronotus brindleyi Boulard, 1980
- Heteronotus broomfieldi Sakakibara, 1979
- Heteronotus bullifer (Burmeister, 1833)
- Heteronotus camaroni Boulard, 1980
- Heteronotus delineatus Walker, 1858
- Heteronotus divisus Walker, 1858
- Heteronotus excisus Walker, 1851
- Heteronotus fabulosus Boulard, 1981
- Heteronotus flavolineatus Laporte, 1832
- Heteronotus flavomaculatus Fonseca, 1936
- Heteronotus formicoides Sakakibara, 1979
- Heteronotus fuscoflavus Boulard, 1980
- Heteronotus glandifer (Lesson, 1832)
- Heteronotus horridus (Fabricius, 1787)
- Heteronotus jauffreti Boulard, 1980
- Heteronotus maculatus Sakakibara, 1968
- Heteronotus modestus Boulard, 1980
- Heteronotus mourei Creão-Duarte & Sakakibara, 1993
- Heteronotus nigrogiganteus Boulard, 1980
- Heteronotus nodosus (Germar, 1821)
- Heteronotus pertyi Metcalf & Wade, 1965
- Heteronotus pompanoni Boulard, 1980
- Heteronotus poupougni Boulard, 1980
- Heteronotus quadrinodosus Fairmaire, 1846
- Heteronotus quinquenodosus Stål, 1864
- Heteronotus reticulatus (Burmeister, 1833)
- Heteronotus sakakibarai Fonseca & Diringshofen, 1974
- Heteronotus spinosus Laporte, 1832
- Heteronotus stipatus Walker, 1858
- Heteronotus tridens (Burmeister, 1833)
- Heteronotus trinodosus Butler, 1878
- Heteronotus vandamei Boulard, 1980
- Heteronotus vespiformes Haviland, 1925
- Heteronotus xanthomelas Walker, 1858
