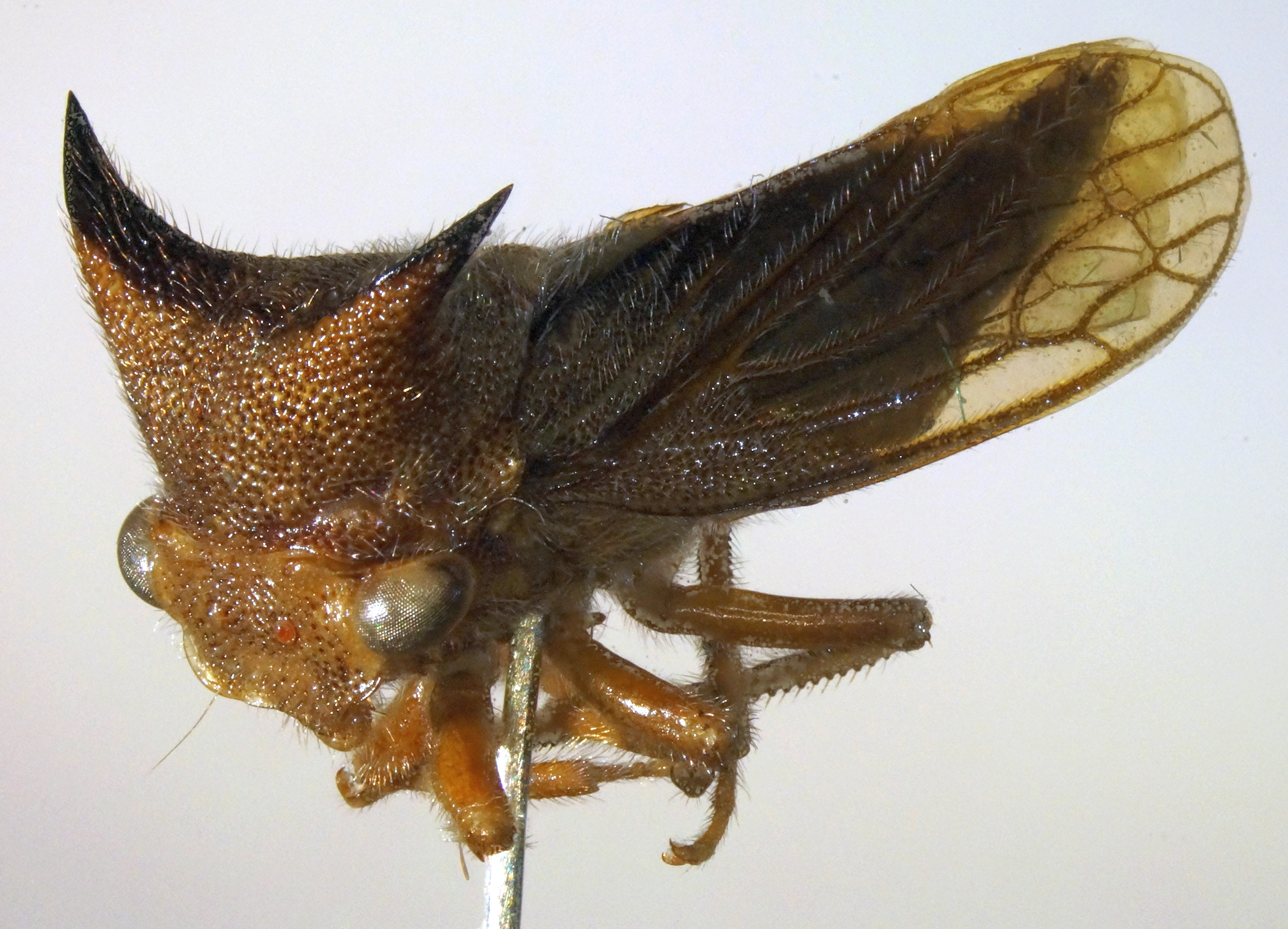

Scientific classification
- Domain: Eukaryota
- Kingdom: Animalia
- Phylum: Arthropoda
- Class: Insecta
- Order: Hemiptera
- Suborder: Auchenorrhyncha
- Family: Membracidae
- Subfamily: Nicomiinae
- Genus: Tolania; Stål, 1858

= Tolania =

Genus of treehopper

Tolania is a genus of treehopper belonging to the subfamily Nicomiinae. It was first described by Carl Stål in 1858. It contains 69 species.

== Distribution ==
Species of the genus Tolania are found in South America and Central America.

== Species ==
Tolania contains the following species:

- Tolania acuticornis Sakakibara & Marques, 2007
- Tolania alida Albertson, 2006
- Tolania alvira Albertson, 2006
- Tolania anomala Albertson, 2006
- Tolania arcuata Albertson, 2006
- Tolania atrata Albertson, 2006
- Tolania brasiliensis Albertson, 2006
- Tolania cactina Albertson, 2006
- Tolania calista Albertson, 2006
- Tolania corcula Albertson, 2006
- Tolania cristata Lethierry, 1890
- Tolania curvata Albertson, 2006
- Tolania damia Albertson, 2006
- Tolania dira Albertson, 2006
- Tolania femoralis Stål, 1862
- Tolania fimbriata Albertson, 2006
- Tolania fraterna Stål, 1862
- Tolania furcata Albertson, 2006
- Tolania gracilis Albertson, 2006
- Tolania grallator Albertson, 2006
- Tolania hamulata Albertson, 2006
- Tolania hispida Albertson, 2006
- Tolania histria Albertson, 2006
- Tolania humilis (Walker, 1858)
- Tolania inca Albertson, 2006
- Tolania inornata Albertson, 2006
- Tolania insolita Albertson, 2006
- Tolania iratafelis Albertson, 2006
- Tolania jocosa Albertson, 2006
- Tolania laticlava Albertson, 2006
- Tolania laticornis Albertson, 2006
- Tolania lunata Albertson, 2006
- Tolania lurida Albertson, 2006
- Tolania macaria Albertson, 2006
- Tolania mackameyi Albertson, 2006
- Tolania malefica Albertson, 2006
- Tolania melantha Albertson, 2006
- Tolania modesta Albertson, 2006
- Tolania nicia Albertson, 2006
- Tolania obliqua (Walker, 1858)
- Tolania obunca Albertson, 2006
- Tolania opponens (Walker, 1858)
- Tolania oriana Albertson, 2006
- Tolania peltacauda Albertson, 2006
- Tolania periculosa Albertson, 2006
- Tolania picta Albertson, 2006
- Tolania pogonia Albertson, 2006
- Tolania reflexa Albertson, 2006
- Tolania rideri Albertson, 2006
- Tolania risa Albertson, 2006
- Tolania roberti Albertson, 2006
- Tolania secoya Albertson, 2006
- Tolania semipellucida (Stål, 1858)
- Tolania sinuata Albertson, 2006
- Tolania stria (Cryan & Deitz, 2002)
- Tolania taura Albertson, 2006
- Tolania terencia Albertson, 2006
- Tolania thyrea Albertson, 2006
- Tolania torosa Albertson, 2006
- Tolania trilobata Albertson, 2006
- Tolania tryphena Albertson, 2006
- Tolania tumida Albertson, 2006
- Tolania umbella Albertson, 2006
- Tolania venezuelensis Albertson, 2006
- Tolania vitocensis Albertson, 2006
- Tolania walkeri Goding, 1931
- Tolania woodi Albertson, 2006
- Tolania xantha Albertson, 2006
- Tolania zaparo Albertson, 2006
