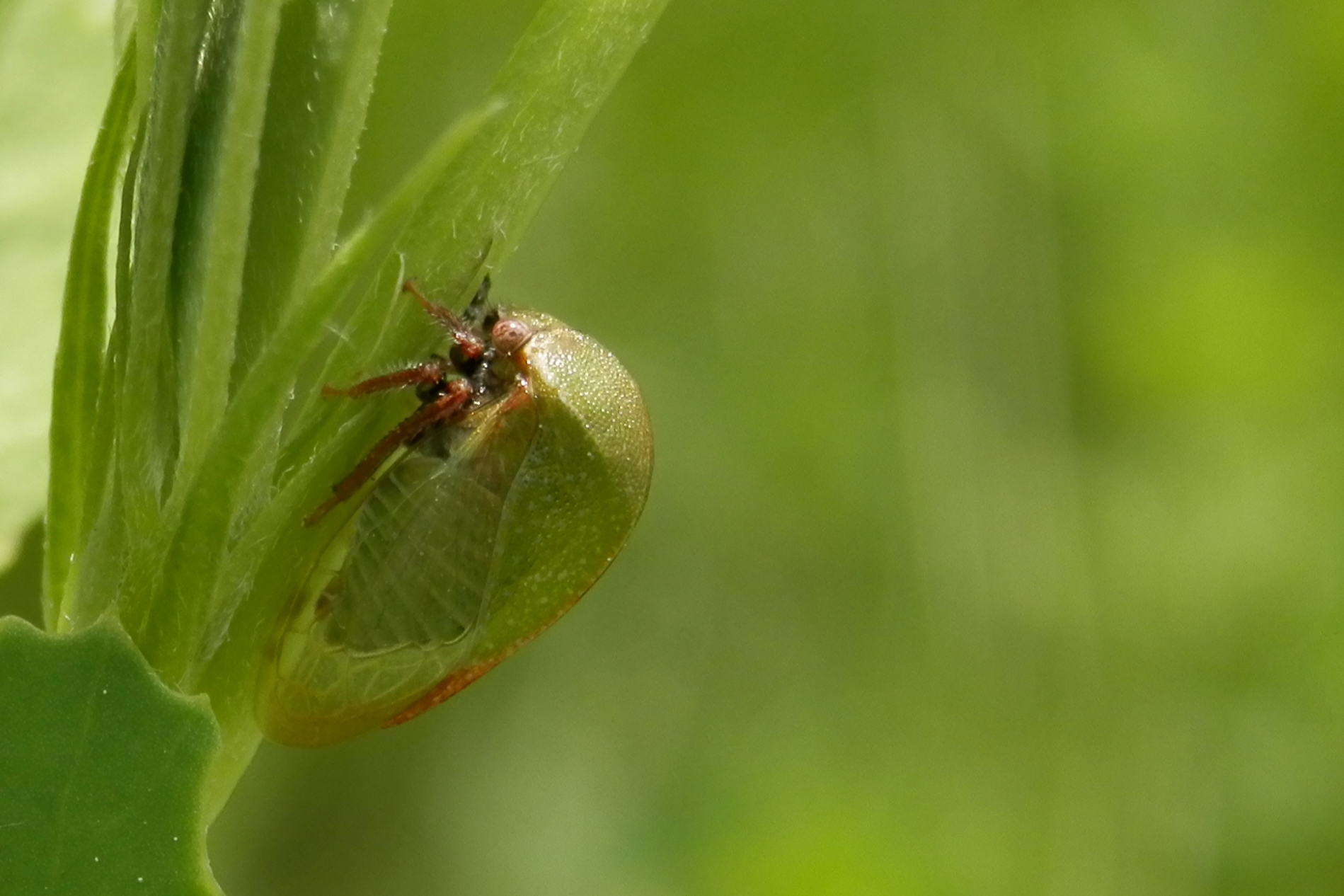

Scientific classification
- Domain: Eukaryota
- Kingdom: Animalia
- Phylum: Arthropoda
- Class: Insecta
- Order: Hemiptera
- Suborder: Auchenorrhyncha
- Family: Membracidae
- Genus: Stictocephala
- Species: S. lutea

Binomial name
- Stictocephala lutea (Walker, 1851)

Synonyms
- Ceresa lutea (Walker, 1851)

= Stictocephala lutea =

Species of treehopper in North America

Stictocephala lutea is a species of treehopper belonging to the tribe Ceresini, or buffalo treehoppers.

Stictocephala lutea is found in eastern and central North America, from February to September.

Stictocephala lutea feeds on multiple genera of trees, including Quercus falcata, Quercus velutina, Melilotus sp., Solidago sp. and Salix sp.
