= Centronodinae =

Scientific classification
- Domain: Eukaryota
- Kingdom: Animalia
- Phylum: Arthropoda
- Class: Insecta
- Order: Hemiptera
- Suborder: Auchenorrhyncha
- Family: Membracidae
- Subfamily: Centronodinae; Deitz, 1975

Subfamily of insects

Centronodinae is a subfamily of treehoppers belonging to the family Membracidae. It contains 3 genera in the single tribe, Centronodini.

== Genera ==
- Centronodus
- Paracentronodus
- Postanomus
