= Polynema euchariforme =

Scientific classification
- Domain: Eukaryota
- Kingdom: Animalia
- Phylum: Arthropoda
- Class: Insecta
- Order: Hymenoptera
- Family: Mymaridae
- Genus: Polynema
- Species: P. euchariforme

Binomial name
- Polynema euchariforme Haliday, 1833

Species of fairyfly

Polynema euchariforme is a species of fairyfly.
