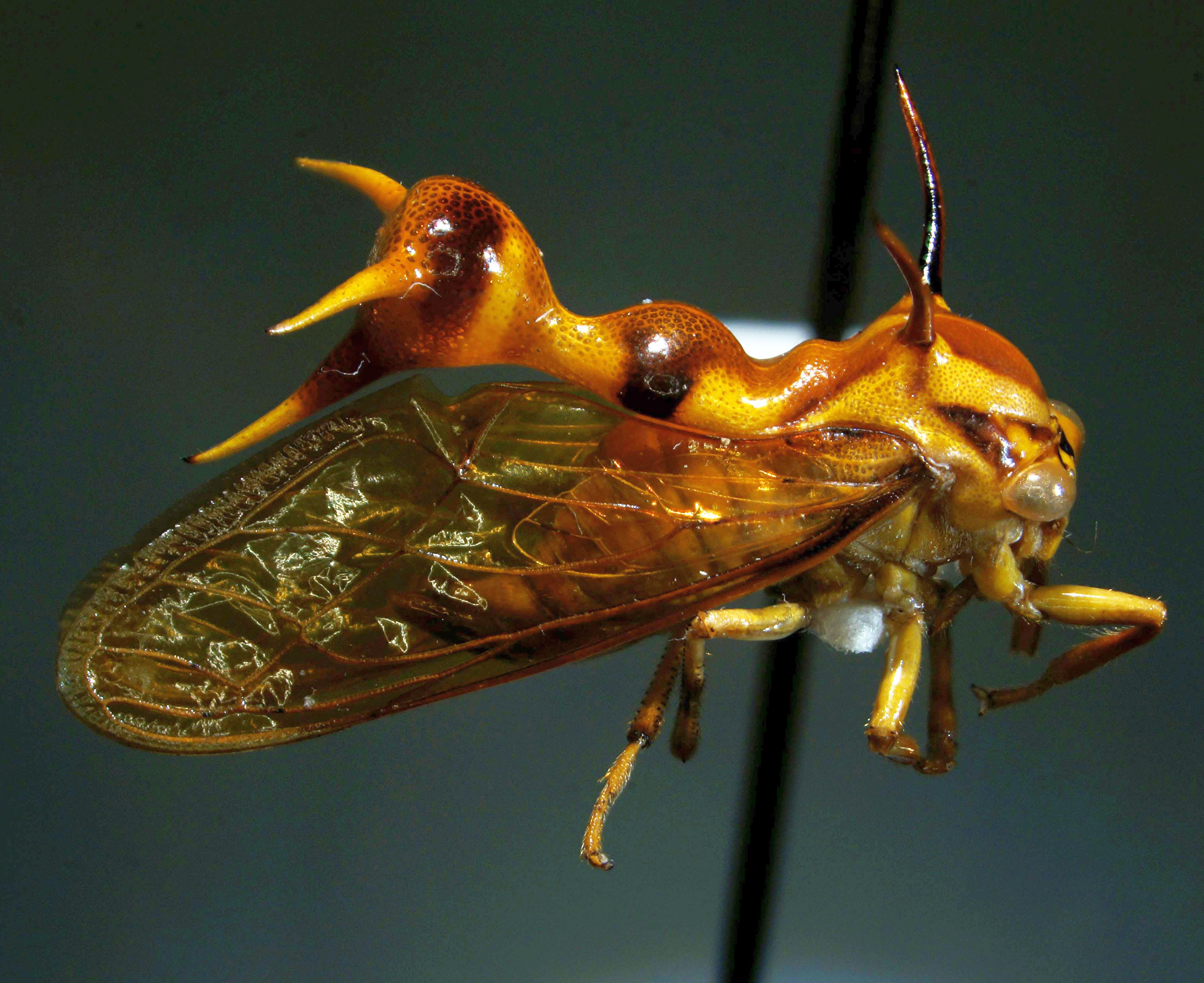

Scientific classification
- Domain: Eukaryota
- Kingdom: Animalia
- Phylum: Arthropoda
- Class: Insecta
- Order: Hemiptera
- Suborder: Auchenorrhyncha
- Family: Membracidae
- Genus: Heteronotus
- Species: H. nodosus

Binomial name
- Heteronotus nodosus (Germar, 1821)

Synonyms
- Membracis nodosa Germar, 1821; Combophora nodosa (Germar, 1821)

= Heteronotus nodosus =

Species of insect

Heteronotus nodosus is a species of treehopper within the family Membracidae. The species is known to be found distributed in Brazil, Costa Rica, and Peru, where individuals are found exclusively feeding on Calliandra angustifolia. The species name nodosus means 'full of knots' in Latin. Ants in the genera Pheidole and Crematogaster have been observed attending Peruvian treehoppers for their honeydew secretions, however for H. nodosus, the adults repel any ants attending the immatures by vigorously moving the abdomen.
