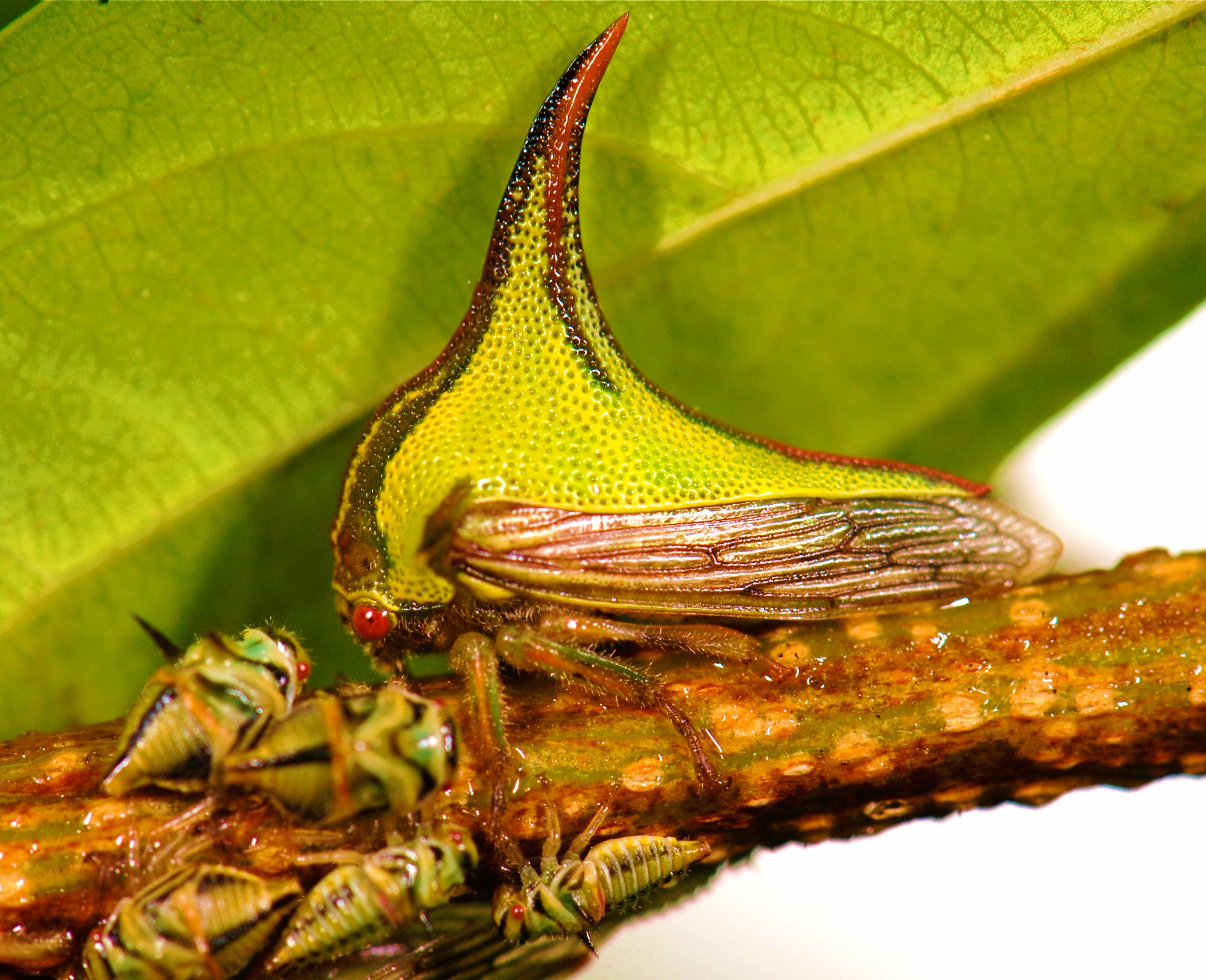
- Umbonia crassicornis

Scientific classification
- Kingdom: Animalia
- Phylum: Arthropoda
- Class: Insecta
- Order: Hemiptera
- Suborder: Auchenorrhyncha
- Family: Membracidae
- Subfamily: Membracinae
- Genus: Umbonia; Burmeister, 1835

= Umbonia =

Genus of treehoppers

Umbonia is a genus of bugs in the family Membracidae. The species can be mainly found in Central America and South America but can also be found in southern Florida. It contains the following species:

- Umbonia amazili Fairmaire
- Umbonia amicalis Walker, 1851
- Umbonia ataliba Fairmaire
- Umbonia crassicornis Amyot & Serville, 1843
- Umbonia curvispina Stål, 1869
- Umbonia ermanii Griffini, 1895
- Umbonia formosa Creão-Duarte & Sakakibara, 1997
- Umbonia gladius Fairmaire
- Umbonia lativitta Walker, 1851
- Umbonia lutea Funkhouser
- Umbonia obscura Walker, 1851
- Umbonia octolineata Goding, 1930
- Umbonia reclinata Germar
- Umbonia reducta Walker
- Umbonia richteri Creão-Duarte & Sakakibara, 1997
- Umbonia signoreti Fairmaire, 1846
- Umbonia spinosa Fabricius
- Umbonia struempeli Creão-Duarte & Sakakibara, 1997
