= Endoiastinae =

Scientific classification
- Domain: Eukaryota
- Kingdom: Animalia
- Phylum: Arthropoda
- Class: Insecta
- Order: Hemiptera
- Suborder: Auchenorrhyncha
- Family: Membracidae
- Subfamily: Endoiastinae; Dietz & Dietrich, 1993

Subfamily of insects

Endoiastinae is a subfamily of treehoppers belonging to the family Membracidae. It contains 3 genera in only 1 tribe, Endoiastini.

== Genera ==
- Endoiastus
- Scytodepsa
- Stictodepsa
