= Polynema howardii =

Scientific classification
- Domain: Eukaryota
- Kingdom: Animalia
- Phylum: Arthropoda
- Class: Insecta
- Order: Hymenoptera
- Family: Mymaridae
- Genus: Polynema
- Species: P. howardii

Binomial name
- Polynema howardii Ashmead, 1887

Synonyms
- Cosmocoma elegans Howard 1881; Cosmocoma howardi Dalla Torre 1890; Cosmocoma howardii; Polynema elegans; Polynema howardi

Species of wasp

Polynema howardii is a species of fairyflies or fairy wasps, insects in the family Mymaridae. It has a Nearctic distribution.
