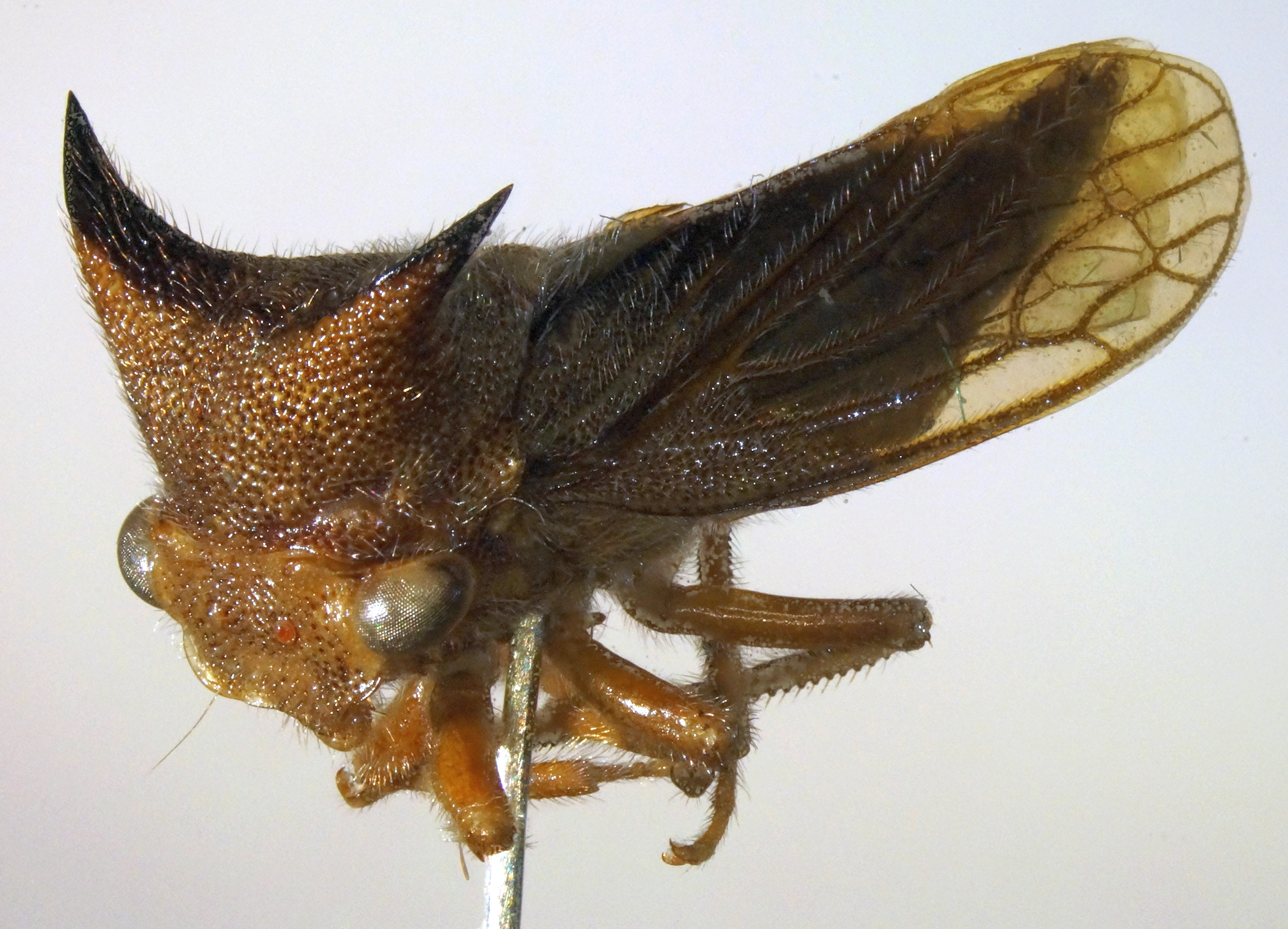

Scientific classification
- Domain: Eukaryota
- Kingdom: Animalia
- Phylum: Arthropoda
- Class: Insecta
- Order: Hemiptera
- Suborder: Auchenorrhyncha
- Family: Membracidae
- Subfamily: Nicomiinae; Haupt, 1929

= Nicomiinae =

Subfamily of insects

Nicomiinae is a subfamily of treehoppers belonging to the family Membracidae. It contains 6 genera in a single tribe, Nicomiini.

== Genera ==
- Eudonica
- Euwalkeria
- Nicomia
- Nodonica
- Stalomia
- Tolania
