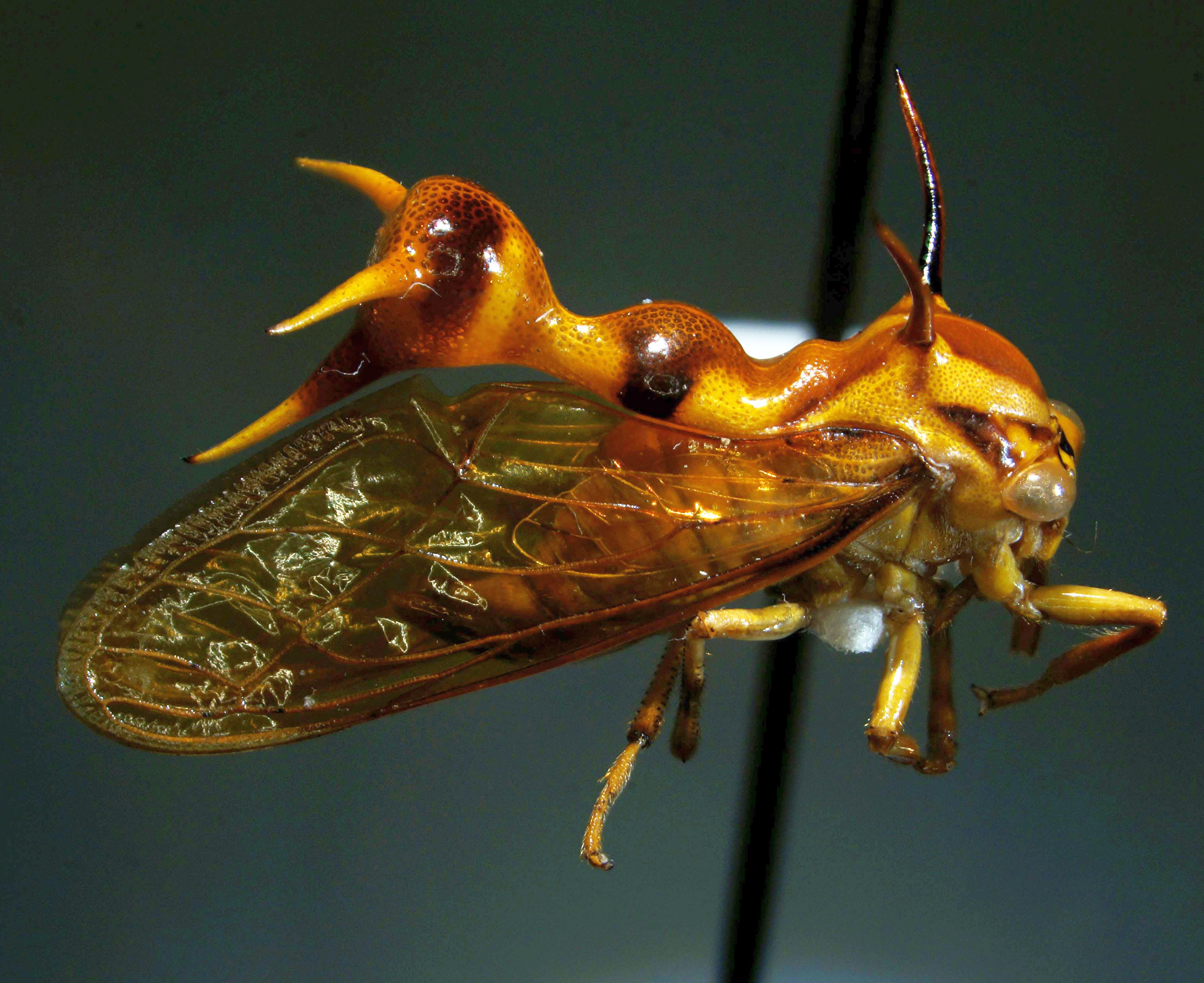

Scientific classification
- Domain: Eukaryota
- Kingdom: Animalia
- Phylum: Arthropoda
- Class: Insecta
- Order: Hemiptera
- Suborder: Auchenorrhyncha
- Family: Membracidae
- Subfamily: Heteronotinae; Goding, 1926
- Tribe: Heteronotini

Type genus
- Heteronotus Laporte, 1832

= Heteronotinae =

Subfamily of insects

Heteronotinae is a subfamily of treehoppers belonging to the family Membracidae. All genera are placed in the single tribe, Heteronotini.

== Genera ==
1. Allodrilus Evangelista, 2014
2. Anchistrotus Buckton, 1902
3. Darnoides Fairmaire, 1846
4. Dysyncritus Fowler, 1895
5. Heteronotus Laporte, 1832
6. Iria Stål, 1867
7. Nassunia Stål, 1860
8. Omolon (insect) Walker, 1862
9. Rhexia (insect) Stål, 1867
10. Smiliorachis Fairmaire, 1846
