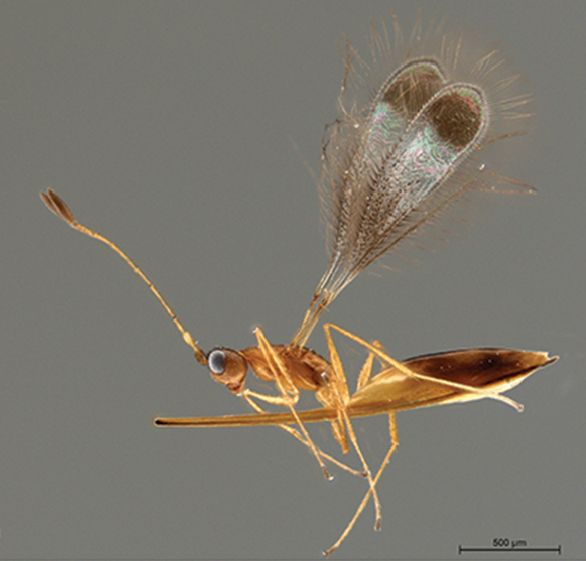
- Polynema sagittaria

Scientific classification
- Kingdom: Animalia
- Phylum: Arthropoda
- Class: Insecta
- Order: Hymenoptera
- Family: Mymaridae
- Genus: Polynema; Haliday, 1833

= Polynema (wasp) =

Genus of wasps

Polynema is a genus of fairyflies or fairy wasps, insects in the family Mymaridae.

== Species ==
Polynema includes over 200 species of fairyfly.

Species include:

- Polynema abdominale Soyka, 1956
- Polynema acutiventre (Soyka, 1956)
- Polynema aequicoloratum (Soyka, 1950)
- Polynema albicorne Girault, 1917
- Polynema albicoxa Ashmead, 1900
- Polynema albitarse Kieffer, 1913
- Polynema alalata Rehmat & Anis, 2015
- Polynema aligherini Girault, 1915
- Polynema altitudine (Soyka, 1950)
- Polynema anantanagana Narayanan, 1961
- Polynema anceps Debauche, 1948
- Polynema antoniae (Soyka, 1950)
- Polynema ara Girault, 1920
- Polynema arcticum Soyka, 1956
- Polynema areolatum (Ogloblin, 1960)
- Polynema aristokratka Triapitsyn, 2021
- Polynema aspidioti Girault, 1911
- Polynema assamense Hayat & Singh, 2001
- Polynema aterrimum (Soyka, 1956)
- Polynema atractoura Debauche, 1948
- Polynema atratum Haliday, 1833
- Polynema atrosimile Soyka, 1956
- Polynema atrum (Soyka, 1956)
- Polynema auricorpus Girault, 1917
- Polynema auripedicellatum (Soyka, 1950)
- Polynema australiense Girault, 1913
- Polynema bakkendorfi Hincks, 1950
- Polynema baronessa Triapitsyn, 2021
- Polynema bengalense Rehmat & Anis, 2015
- Polynema bergi Ashmead, 1905
- Polynema bicolorigastra Rehmat & Anis, 2015
- Polynema bimaculatipenne Girault, 1911
- Polynema bischoffi (Soyka, 1950)
- Polynema bitashimwae Debauche, 1949
- Polynema blackbourni Girault, 1932
- Polynema boreum Girault, 1915
- Polynema brevicarinae Annecke & Doutt, 1961
- Polynema breviscapus Girault, 1938
- Polynema brittanum Girault, 1911
- Polynema caesariatipenne Girault, 1911
- Polynema calceatiscapus (Soyka, 1940)
- Polynema capillatum Soyka, 1956
- Polynema carbonelli (Ogloblin, 1963)
- Polynema carpaticum Soyka, 1956
- Polynema ciliatum (Say, 1829)
- Polynema collaris Soyka, 1956
- Polynema crassa Mani & Saraswat, 1973
- Polynema daffy Anwar, Zeya & Usman, 2024
- Polynema darwini Girault, 1913
- Polynema decoloratum Soyka, 1956
- Polynema devriesi Girault, 1913
- Polynema dhenkunde Mani & Saraswat, 1973
- Polynema dikobraz Triapitsyn, 2017
- Polynema draperi Girault, 1912
- Polynema dunense Hayat & Anis, 1999
- Polynema editha Girault, 1938
- Polynema elatum Girault, 1929
- Polynema elegantissimum Soyka, 1956
- Polynema elongatum Soyka, 1956
- Polynema enchenopae Girault, 1911
- Polynema englandicus Özdikmen, 2011
- Polynema euchariforme Haliday, 1833
- Polynema eucharis Perkins, 1912
- Polynema europensis Özdikmen, 2011
- Polynema eurydice (Debauche, 1949)
- Polynema eutettexi Girault, 1917
- Polynema fennicosimile (Soyka, 1940)
- Polynema fennicum Soyka, 1946
- Polynema filicorne Soyka, 1956
- Polynema flavipes Walker, 1846
- Polynema florum Girault, 1929
- Polynema foersteri Soyka, 1946
- Polynema franklini Girault, 1913
- Polynema frater Girault, 1913
- Polynema fulmeki Soyka, 1941
- Polynema fumipenne Walker, 1846
- Polynema fuscipes Haliday, 1833
- Polynema gallica Soyka, 1956
- Polynema gargarae Viggiani & Jesu, 1986
- Polynema gigas Perkins, 1910
- Polynema giraulti Perkins, 1912
- Polynema glabricorpus Girault, 1929
- Polynema globosiventris Soyka, 1956
- Polynema gracile (Nees, 1834)
- Polynema gracilior Soyka, 1946
- Polynema graculus Girault, 1911
- Polynema grotiusi Girault, 1913
- Polynema haeckeli Girault, 1913
- Polynema haitianum Dozier, 1932
- Polynema halidayi Debauche, 1948
- Polynema hayati Rehmat & Anis, 2015
- Polynema hebe (Debauche, 1949)
- Polynema hegeli Girault, 1915
- Polynema helena Girault, 1925
- Polynema helochaeta (Debauche, 1949)
- Polynema howardii (Ashmead, 1887)
- Polynema hundsheimense Soyka, 1956
- Polynema hyalinipenne Girault, 1917
- Polynema illustre Soyka, 1956
- Polynema imitatrix Gahan, 1918
- Polynema imperatrix Triapitsyn, 2021
- Polynema inconsuetum Soyka, 1956
- Polynema jassidarum Perkins, 1910
- Polynema joulei Girault, 1918
- Polynema kalatopense Mani & Saraswat, 1973
- Polynema kamathi Mani & Saraswat, 1973
- Polynema koroleva Triapitsyn, 2021
- Polynema kressbachi Soyka, 1956
- Polynema lansi Soyka, 1956
- Polynema latior Soyka, 1956
- Polynema latipectoris Soyka, 1956
- Polynema latissimum Soyka, 1956
- Polynema lodgei Girault, 1913
- Polynema longicauda Kieffer, 1913
- Polynema longigaster Soyka, 1956
- Polynema longior Soyka, 1956
- Polynema longipectoris (Soyka, 1956)
- Polynema longipennatum Soyka, 1956
- Polynema longipes (Ashmead, 1887)
- Polynema longum (Soyka, 1956)
- Polynema loriger Kieffer, 1916
- Polynema lucidum Soyka, 1956
- Polynema luteolum (Ogloblin, 1960)
- Polynema maculipes (Ashmead, 1887)
- Polynema magniceps Ashmead, 1900
- Polynema mahamoodi Anwar, Zeya & Khan, 2024
- Polynema maidli Soyka, 1956
- Polynema malkwitzi Soyka, 1956
- Polynema manaliense Hayat & Anis, 1999
- Polynema marginatum (Soyka, 1940)
- Polynema marilandicum Girault, 1917
- Polynema markiza Triapitsyn, 2021
- Polynema masha Anwar, Zeya & Usman, 2024
- Polynema mboroense Triapitsyn, 2021
- Polynema medicae (Annecke & Doutt, 1961)
- Polynema megacephala Risbec, 1951
- Polynema mendeleefi Girault, 1913
- Polynema mendeli Girault, 1913
- Polynema microptera Bakkendorf, 1934
- Polynema modestum (Soyka, 1940)
- Polynema mundum Soyka, 1946
- Polynema nativum Girault, 1929
- Polynema needhami Ashmead, 1900
- Polynema neofuscipes (Soyka, 1946)
- Polynema neopusillum Soyka, 1956
- Polynema neorectum Soyka, 1956
- Polynema neustadti Soyka, 1956
- Polynema nigriceps Soyka, 1956
- Polynema nordaui Girault, 1913
- Polynema notabilissimum Girault, 1913
- Polynema novickyi Soyka, 1946
- Polynema ovatum Soyka, 1956
- Polynema ovulorum (Linnaeus, 1758)
- Polynema pallidipenne Soyka, 1956
- Polynema pallidum Soyka, 1956
- Polynema palustre Soyka, 1956
- Polynema parvipennis Soyka, 1956
- Polynema parvipetiolatum Soyka, 1956
- Polynema pax Girault, 1913
- Polynema pechlaneri Soyka, 1956
- Polynema pellucens Soyka, 1956
- Polynema pennicilipennis Soyka, 1956
- Polynema perforator Perkins, 1910
- Polynema permagnum Soyka, 1956
- Polynema perkinsi Özdikmen, 2011
- Polynema pernigripes Girault, 1917
- Polynema phaseoli Dozier, 1932
- Polynema picea Soyka, 1956
- Polynema picipes Girault, 1905
- Polynema pilipennis Soyka, 1956
- Polynema pilosum (Soyka, 1940)
- Polynema poeta Girault, 1913
- Polynema poincarei Girault, 1913
- Polynema polandica Özdikmen, 2011
- Polynema polonicum Soyka, 1956
- Polynema polychromum (Ogloblin, 1960)
- Polynema pratensiphagum Walley, 1929
- Polynema princessa Triapitsyn, 2021
- Polynema prolongatum (Soyka, 1956)
- Polynema protractum Soyka, 1956
- Polynema pulchricoloris Soyka, 1956
- Polynema pulchrum Soyka, 1956
- Polynema pusilloides Debauche, 1948
- Polynema pusillum Haliday, 1833
- Polynema pyrophila Perkins, 1910
- Polynema qassimense Anwar, Zeya & Khan, 2024
- Polynema quadricaput Soyka, 1956
- Polynema quadripetiolatum Girault, 1938
- Polynema quadruplex (Soyka, 1940)
- Polynema rangatira Triapitsyn, 2021
- Polynema rectosimile Soyka, 1956
- Polynema rectum Soyka, 1956
- Polynema reticulatum (Ogloblin, 1946)
- Polynema richmondense Hincks, 1960
- Polynema sagittaria van Noort & Triapitsyn, 2018
- Polynema silvifilia Girault, 1925
- Polynema solare (Soyka, 1940)
- Polynema speciosissimum Girault, 1915
- Polynema speciosum (Soyka, 1940)
- Polynema spectabile (Soyka, 1956)
- Polynema spenceri Girault, 1912
- Polynema stammeri Soyka, 1946
- Polynema striaticorne Girault, 1911
- Polynema stubaiense (Soyka, 1956)
- Polynema stupendum Girault, 1938
- Polynema sublestum Girault, 1938
- Polynema synophropsis Viggiani & Jesu, 1991
- Polynema tantalea Perkins, 1910
- Polynema tenue Soyka, 1956
- Polynema tenuiforme Soyka, 1956
- Polynema tenuisimile (Soyka, 1940)
- Polynema thoreauini Girault, 1915
- Polynema triscia Perkins, 1910
- Polynema tyakshiensis Irfan & Anis, 2023
- Polynema umbrosum Soyka, 1956
- Polynema unicolor Soyka, 1956
- Polynema uruguayensis Özdikmen, 2011
- Polynema uroxys (Debauche, 1949)
- Polynema valkenburgense Soyka, 1931
- Polynema vallis (Soyka, 1940)
- Polynema varians Soyka, 1956
- Polynema victoria Girault, 1938
- Polynema virgilii Girault, 1938
- Polynema wagneri Rimsky-Korsakov, 1920
- Polynema wallacei Girault, 1915
- Polynema waterhousei Hincks, 1950
- Polynema weyeri (Soyka, 1956)
- Polynema woodi Hincks, 1950
- Polynema zangwilli Girault, 1913
- Polynema zetes Girault, 1911
- Polynema zolai Girault, 1915
