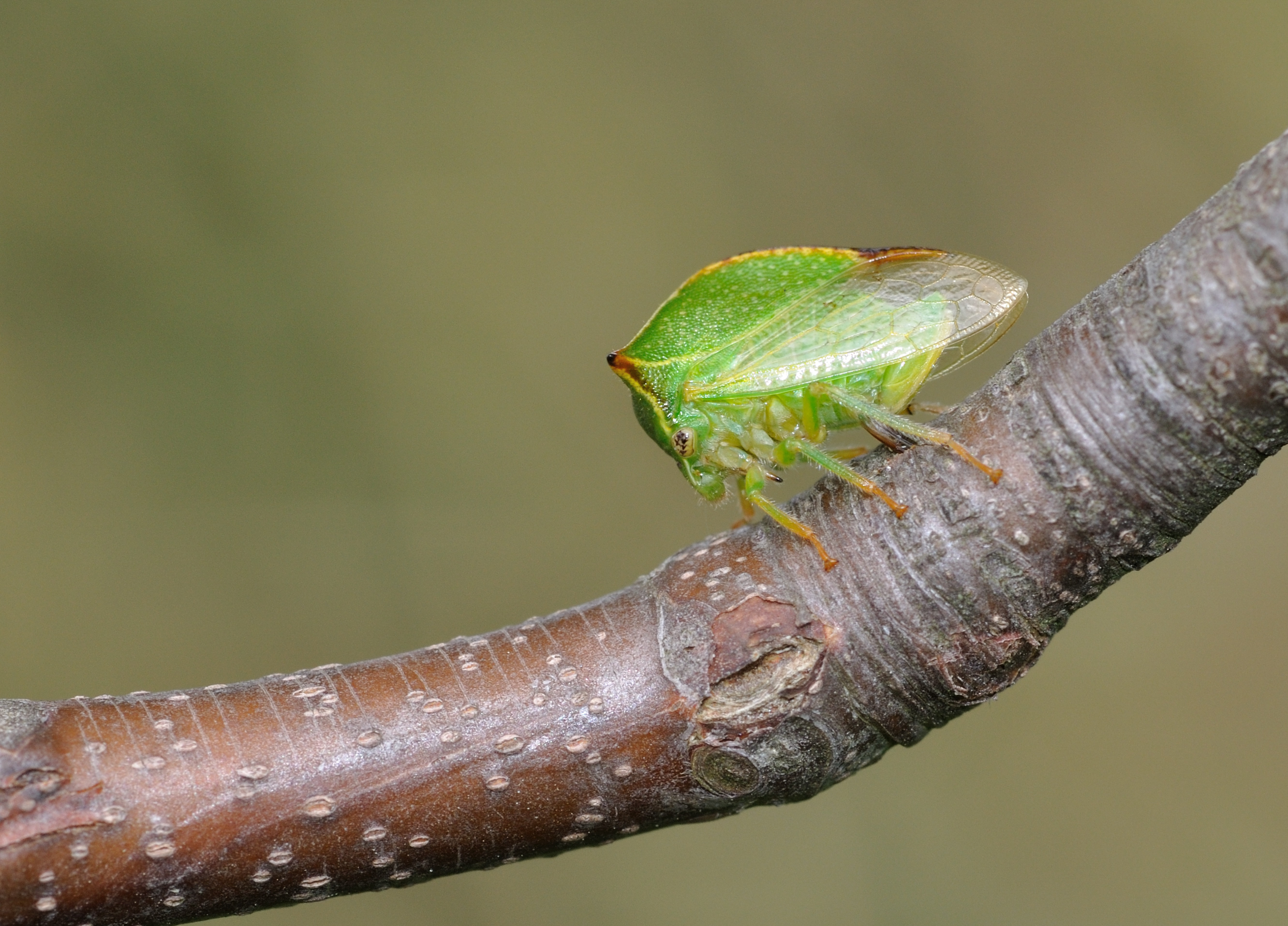
- Stictocephala bisonia, side view

Scientific classification
- Kingdom: Animalia
- Phylum: Arthropoda
- Clade: Pancrustacea
- Class: Insecta
- Order: Hemiptera
- Suborder: Auchenorrhyncha
- Family: Membracidae
- Genus: Stictocephala
- Species: S. bisonia

Binomial name
- Stictocephala bisonia Kopp & Yonke, 1977

= Buffalo treehopper =

Species of true bug

The buffalo treehopper (Stictocephala bisonia) is a species of treehopper belonging to the subfamily Smiliinae. It is sometimes classified as Ceresa bisonia.

== Distribution ==
This species is native to North America, but now it is widespread throughout southern Europe and it is also present in the Near East and in North Africa. Also recently reported from vineyards of Kashmir, India

== Appearance ==
Buffalo treehoppers are a bright green color and have a somewhat triangular shape that helps camouflage them so as to resemble thorns or a twiggy protuberance. It gets its name from the vague resemblance of its profile to that of an American bison. They grow to 6 to 8 millimeters (0.24 to 0.31 in) long and have transparent wings.

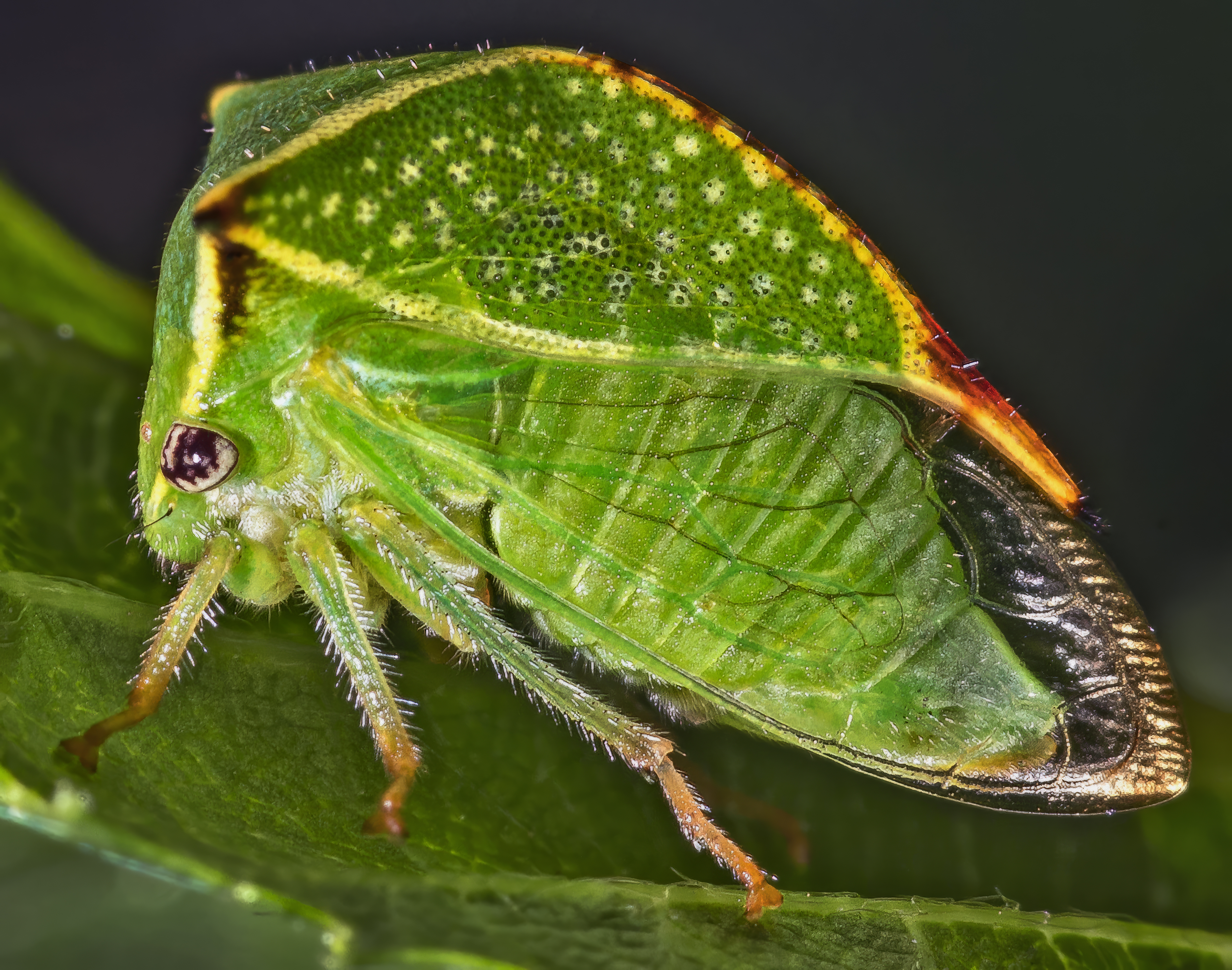
Stictocephala bisonia Side view

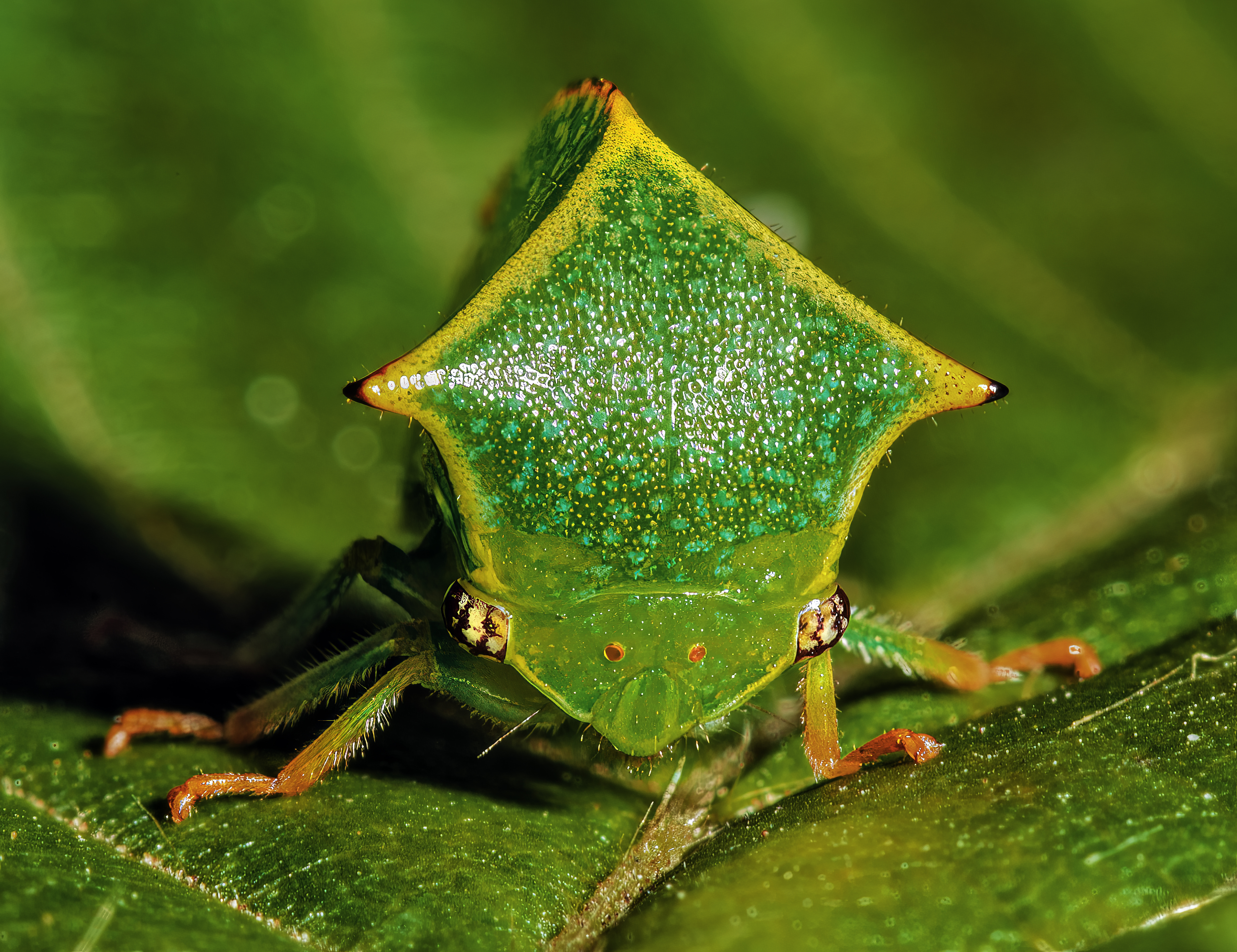
Front view

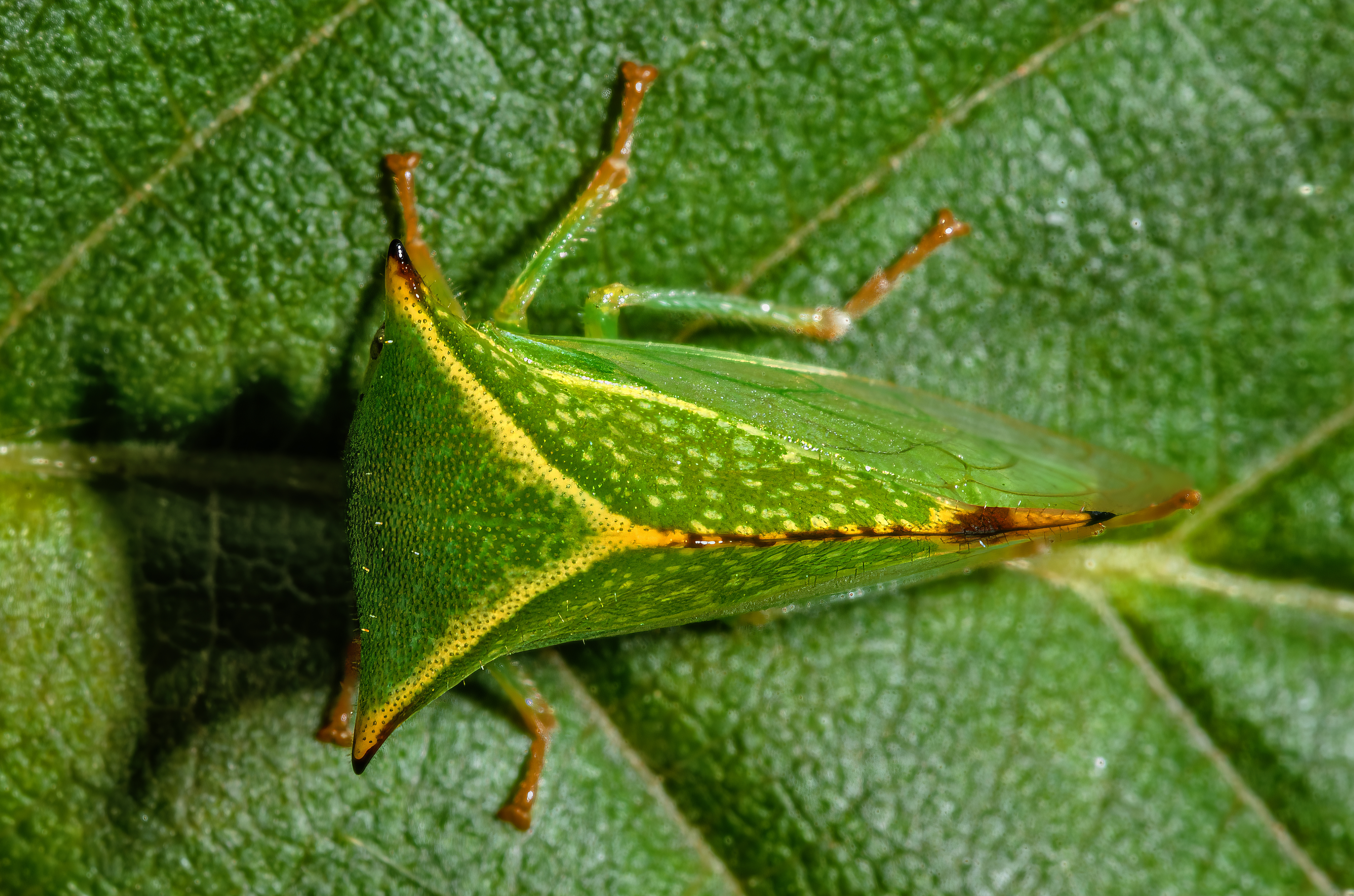
Dorsal view

== Life cycle ==
S. bisonia mates during the summer months. Males attract females with a song that, unlike similar songs used by cicada and crickets, is perceived by the female not as sound waves but as vibrations through the host plant. Females lay eggs from July to October using a blade-like ovipositor. Up to a dozen eggs are laid in each slit made by the female.

Nymphs emerge from the eggs the following May or June. The nymphs, which resemble wingless adults, but have a more spiny appearance, descend from the trees where they hatched to feed on grasses, weeds, and other nonwoody plants.

They molt several times in the following month and a half until they have reached adulthood. Then they return to the trees to continue their life cycle.

== Feeding ==
Both adult and immature buffalo treehoppers feed upon sap using specialized mouthparts suited for this purpose. Black locust, clover, elm, goldenrod, and willow are among their favorite food sources. It is also an occasional pest of fruit trees and is harmful to young orchard trees, especially apple trees. It has become an invasive species in some parts of Europe.

== Bibliography ==
- Alberto Alma et al., Particularities of Polynema striaticorne as egg parasite of Stictocephala bisonia (Rhynchota: Auchenorrhyncha), 6th Auchenorrhyncha Meeting Turin, 1988, pp. 597–603.
- Arzone, C. Vidano, A. Alma Auchenorrhyncha introduced into Europe from the Nearctic region: taxonomic and phytopathological problems. Proceedings of 2nd International Workshop on Leafhoppers and Planthoppers of Economic Importance : Brigham Young University, Provo, Utah, USA, 28 July-1 August 1986: 3-17
- D. D. Kopp, Yonke, T. R., Taxonomic Status of the Buffalo Treehopper and the Name Ceresa bubalus, in Annals of the Entomological Society of America, vol. 70, no. 6, 1977, pp. 901–905
- Gabriel Simões de Andrade (1997): Stictocephala alta (Walker, 1851) sp. rev., comb. n., the Correct Name for the "Buffalo Treehopper", with S. bisonia Kopp & Yonke, 1977 as a New Synonym, and Notes on Hadrophallus bubalus (Fabricius, 1794) comb. n. (Homoptera: Membracidae). Transactions of the American Entomological Society Vol. 123, No. 4: 289-295.
- Gabriel Simões de Andrade (2008): On the synonymy of Stictocephala alta (Walker) and Thelia constans Walker (Hemiptera: Membracidae). Revista Brasileira de Zoologia 25 (1): 148–149
- P. Bovey & H. Leuzinger (1938): Présence en Suisse de Ceresa bubalus F., Membracidae nuisible d’origine américaine. Bulletin de la Société Vaudoise des sciences naturelles 60: 193–200
- W. V. Balduf: Observations on the buffalo tree-hopper Ceresa bubalus Fabr. (Membracidae, Homoptera) and the bionomics of an egg parasite, Polynema striaticorne Girault (Mymaridae, Hymenoptera). Annals of the Entomological Society of America, 1928, 21(3):419-435.
