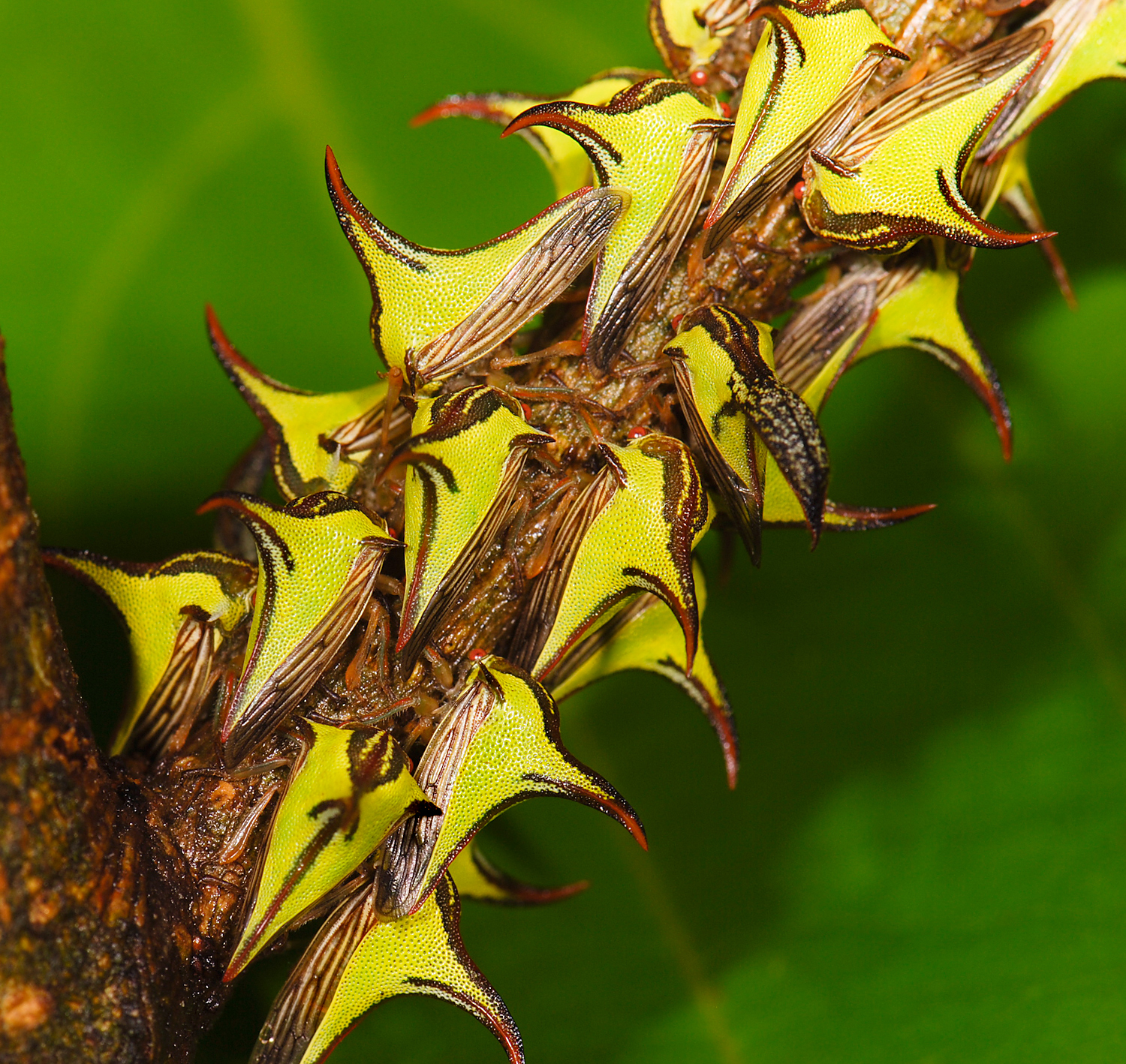

Scientific classification
- Kingdom: Animalia
- Phylum: Arthropoda
- Class: Insecta
- Order: Hemiptera
- Suborder: Auchenorrhyncha
- Family: Membracidae
- Genus: Umbonia
- Species: U. crassicornis

Binomial name
- Umbonia crassicornis (Amyot & Serville, 1843)

= Umbonia crassicornis =

Species of true bug

Umbonia crassicornis, commonly known as the thorn bug, is a widespread member of the insect family Membracidae, and an occasional pest of ornamentals and fruit trees in southern Florida. The body length of the adult is approximately 10 millimetres (0.39 in). This is a variable species as to size, color and structure, particularly the pronotal horn of males (which is more angled posteriorly than the females' and often somewhat expanded apically). This tall, essentially perpendicular thornlike pronotum discourages birds and other predators from eating it, if only by mistakenly confusing it with a thorn. Typically, the adult is green or yellow with reddish lines and brownish markings.

== Distribution ==
The species is restricted to warmer climates where temperatures stay, on average, above zero. This limits the species to the tropical regions of Northern South America to Mexico and Florida. Any range of temperature below 0 degrees is fatal resulting in a 10-90 percent decrease in the population as temperature decreases. Its preferred hosts are ornamental and fruit trees of subtropical regions feeding on sap inside the plants.

== Reproduction ==
Female Umbonia crassicornis often deposit about 100 eggs at a time into a plant stem, under the bark. However, sometimes a female will lay her eggs in the leaf petiole even though they can be shed occasionally. The female will choose her brooding site based on if she can wrap her legs around the branch (diameter about 3.8mm) The mother will stay with the clutch (a group of young) until the nymphs are mature. Without an adult female present during the nymphs development, the survival rate of the clutch drops from 53% survival to 27%. If a clutch's defending female dies, the clutch can be adopted by a nearby female and the two clutches will combine into one, though the survival rate decreases significantly.

A clutch normally consists of all full siblings, since the female usually only mates once, and sibling are more likely to defend each other based on this close relatedness. A problem with a large group of closely related young growing up together is the possibility of Inbreeding once the individuals reach reproductive maturity. When this happens survival rate of the offspring drops significantly due to mutations caused by mating with a sibling.

=== Mate selection ===
Because a female U. crassicornis only mates once in her life (typically), males are forced to search and compete for a female. They do this using the 'fly-call-walk' strategy in which a male will fly from one plant to another, then will walk around and strut. Once he encounters a female, the male will present vibrational signals to the female and if there is no response he will fly to another tree. If the female responds to these vibrations the male will approach the female and climb onto her side to initiate mating.

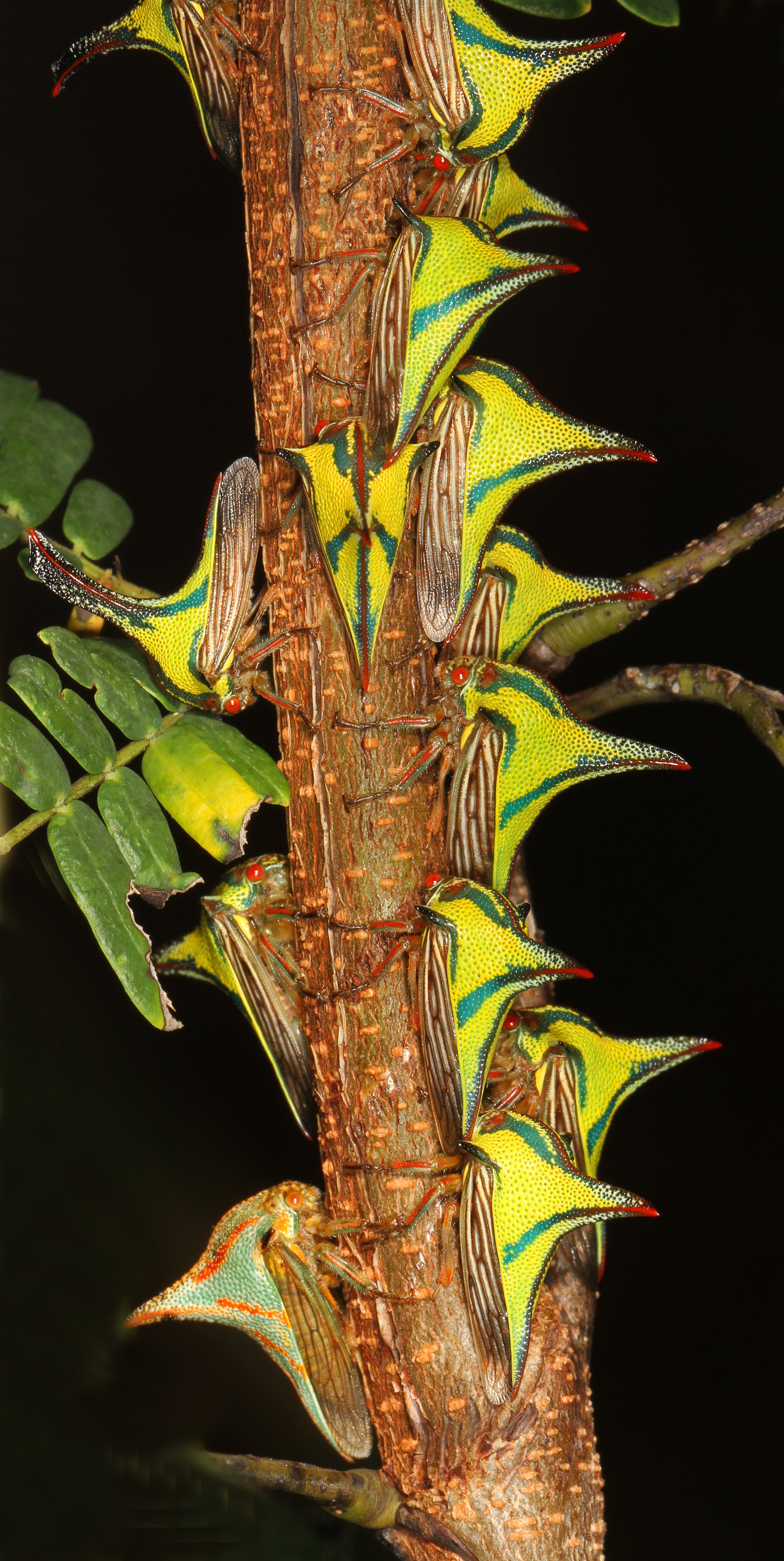
A group of Thorn Bugs aggregated on a tree branch

=== Mechanical basis of the courtship call ===
When performing their courtship call, the thorn bugs use the muscles in their abdomen to generate a continuous call that decreases in frequency as the tone gets longer, and high frequency clicks at periodic times in the call caused by the muscles pulling on the horn of the insect resulting in the clicks.

=== Competition ===
Because of the method of active mate searching in males, there is a significant difference in the mating ability of older males (25–33 days old) and younger males (19–25 days old) due to a loss of the ability to sustain flight and compete physically against other males. Older males are found only walking to search for females and their encounter rate is much lower than males that can fly from tree to tree. Though if a female has the choice between a younger and older male she will almost always pick the older male, the theories predict that this is because of their increased sexual advertisement and that they perform more overall courtships.

== Sex bias ==
When a female plants her eggs on a branch, her clutch uses up a lot of that site's resources. Due to this, some clutches use up more resources than the host plant can provide, this can result in adults being much smaller than preferred. A female having a smaller body size, though can lay fewer eggs than a larger female, will not impact her overall reproductive fitness and will still be able to produce viable offspring. Males, on the other hand, have to compete with other males to reproduce so being smaller than average will affect his ability to mate and find food. These factors contribute to the altered sex ratio we see in U. crassicornis being a larger number of females in populations than males.

== Dispersal ==
Once the young have matured to a point where they can leave the congregates, males will leave first averaging about 7 meters from the host plant, whereas females, who leave after the male stay closer only traveling 3 meters. This separation of sexes helps discourage inbreeding and results in a population that is more stable. Though inbreeding is not ideal, we still see it in close populations and there doesn't seem to be many preventive measures in place to prevent inbreeding from taking place other than the female's preference for older males.

== Communication ==
Umbonia crassicornis generally use a substrate-borne form of communication, allowing the parent and nymphs to communicate through chemically triggered vibrations. The main reason for these vibrational signals is in response to predators like the vespid wasp (one of the nymph's main predators). It is also seen that vibrations can be used to communicating within the brood.

These signals act as an anti-predator response and alert the mother to the presence of danger, the mother, however, will only respond to the brood if their signaling is synchronized, so the whole group has to work together to alert the mother otherwise she will not respond. To achieve this, young must respond immediately after hearing the signal from another nymph for their response to be synchronized. In doing this, the brood is deciding whether a threat is worth risking the mother attacking and possibly being removed from the congregate. If all the young in the brood decide the threat is worth the risk, then a synchronized signal is created. If only a few nymphs call about the disturbance then the synchronization won't be achieved and the mother will not respond. If the mother still can not find the threat after the young have signaled her, she will respond 'asking for help' to find the predator.

Though the nymphs are a good detector of predators, no one nymph can predict if the threat has left or not due to each individual only being able to scan a small area. The only good predictor that the predator has retreated is the mother. After they have deterred the threat the mother will send out a signal to her young to tell them they are safe.

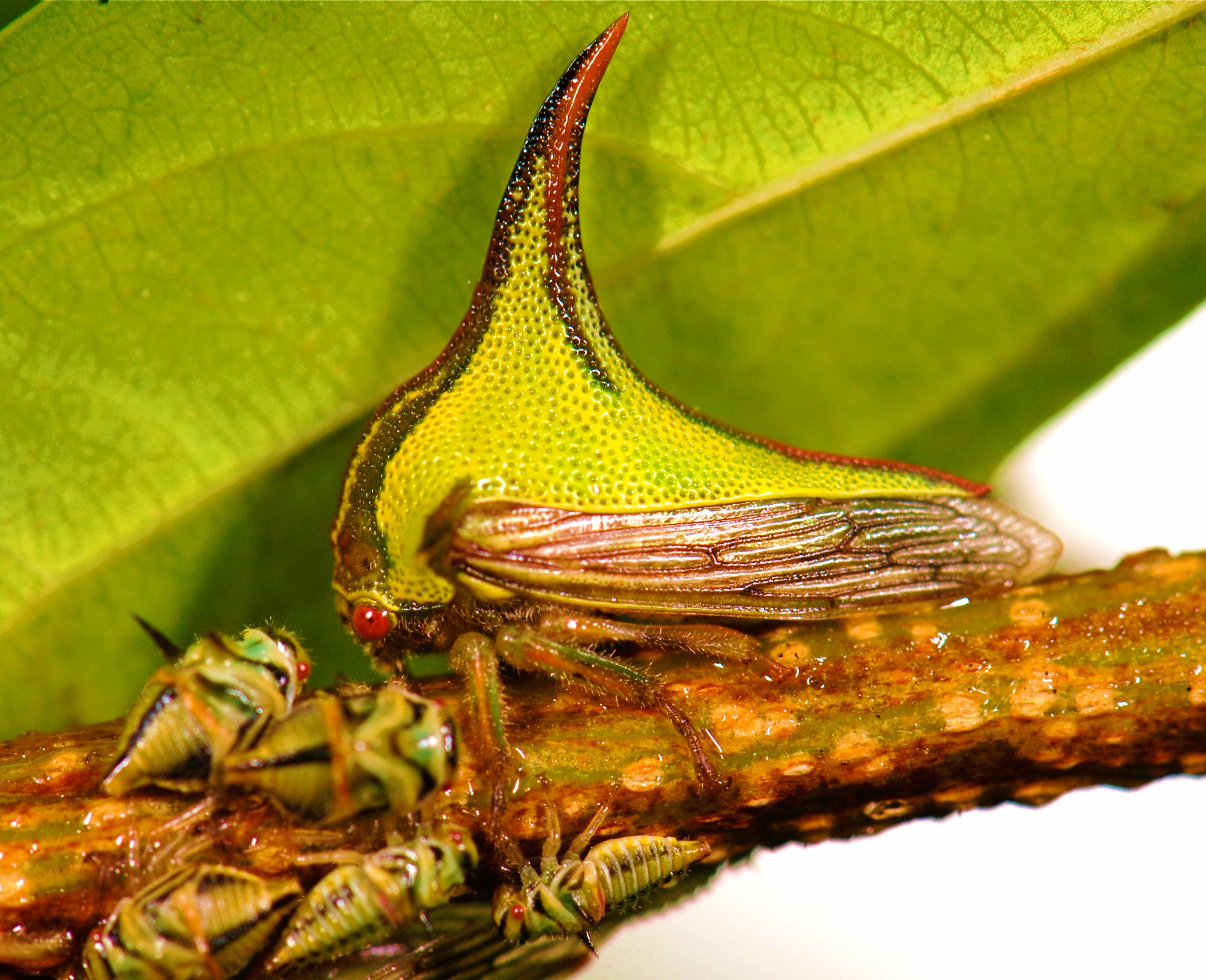
A mother Thorn bug and some of her nymphs

=== False alarms ===
While living in a group, one individual can spur a magnitude of responses throughout the whole system. If one individual reacts to a stimulus that is not a real threat, then the reaction cascades through the whole group and stimulates the mother's response. Because of this false response by all the members, the whole group is missing out on feeding opportunities. When a mother gets signaled by a false alarm and she cannot detect a predator she will send out her signal to the nymphs alerting them that there is no predator. This signal acts as a negative feedback signal essentially training the nymphs to be less sensitive to disturbances and become more accurate in detecting potential threats.

== Sibling rivalry ==
When a large number of offspring are attacked by a predator, the risk factor is spread unequally amongst all the young. Certain circumstances lead to sibling rivalry in a brood of thorn bugs. Whether or not the mother is present can determine if a brood will compete with one another. When the female is present, a predator is only successful in removing a nymph 25% of the time, this number jumps to 95% when the female is absent.

If a predator approaches the aggregation, it is more likely to take a nymph that is on the margin on the congregate, this produces a rivalry for sibling to want to be in the center of the brood and will fight over who will be on the outside because they have a higher risk of being preyed on.

Another major factor leading to competition is the closeness of the nymph to the mother. The average time it takes the mother to travel 1.5 cm (about the body length of the mother) is 7.7 seconds, this is plenty of time for a predator like a wasp to circle the brood and move away from the mother. Because of this, siblings will fight for spots closest to the mother for better protection.
