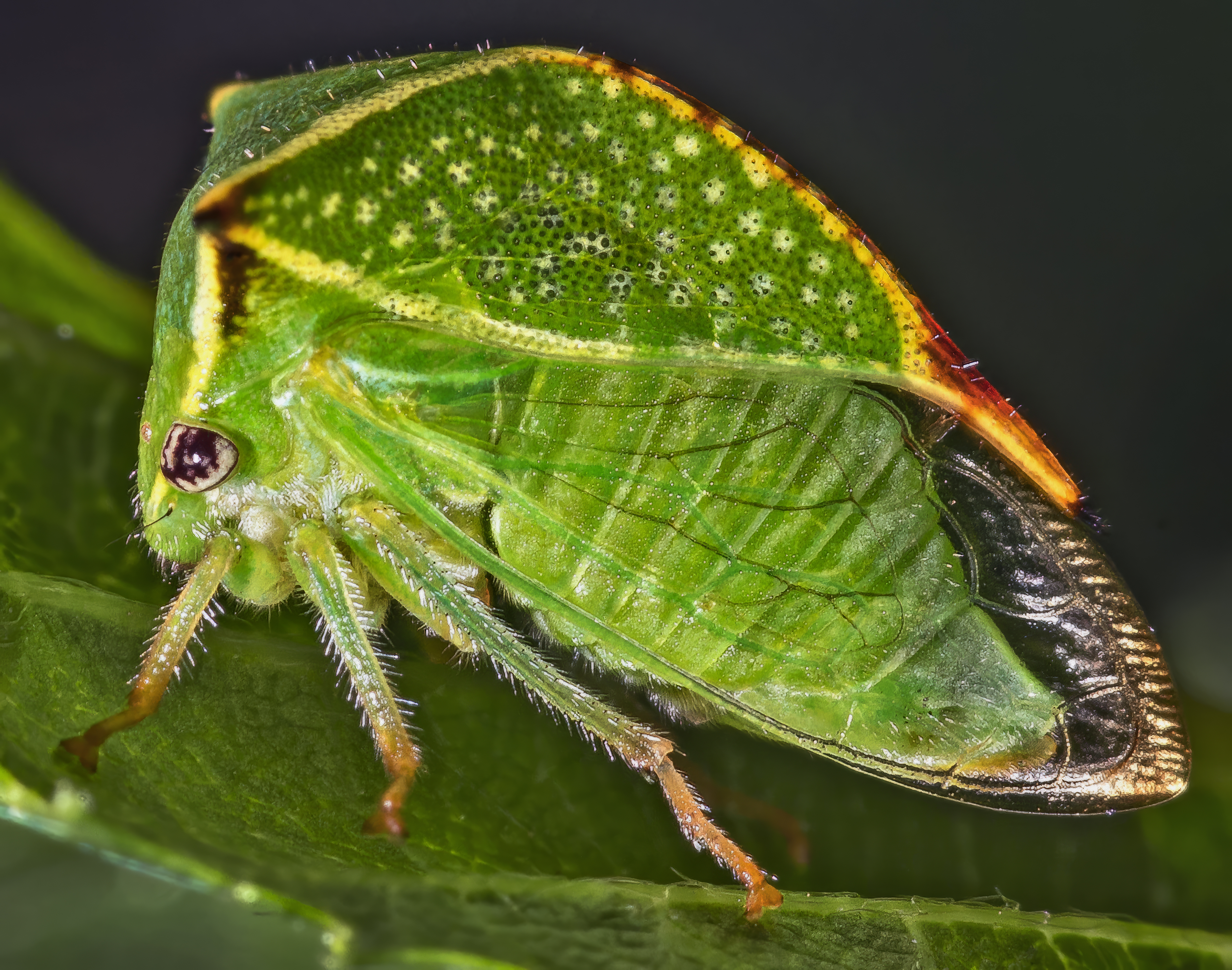
- Stictocephala bisonia

Scientific classification
- Kingdom: Animalia
- Phylum: Arthropoda
- Clade: Pancrustacea
- Class: Insecta
- Order: Hemiptera
- Suborder: Auchenorrhyncha
- Infraorder: Cicadomorpha
- Superfamily: Membracoidea
- Family: Membracidae; Rafinesque, 1815

Subfamilies
- Centronodinae (disputed); Centrotinae; Darninae; Endoiastinae; Heteronotinae; Membracinae; Nicomiinae (disputed); Smiliinae; Stegaspidinae (disputed) and see text

Synonyms
- Nicomiidae

= Treehopper =

Family of insects

Treehoppers (more precisely typical treehoppers to distinguish them from the Aetalionidae) and thorn bugs are members of the family Membracidae, a group of insects related to the cicadas and the leafhoppers. About 3,200 species of treehoppers in over 400 genera are known. They are found on all continents except Antarctica; only five species are known from Europe. Individual treehoppers usually live for only a few months.

== Morphology ==
A treehopper of the species Heteronotus nodosus investigated by Micro-CT, revealing the interior morphology. The interior of the extended pronotum, in this species mimicking a wasp's body, is empty.

Treehoppers have long interested naturalists due to their unusual appearance. They are best known for their enlarged and ornate pronotum, expanded into often fantastic shapes that enhance their camouflage or mimicry, often resembling plant thorns (thus the commonly used name of "thorn bugs" for a number of treehopper species). Treehoppers have specialized muscles in the hind femora that unfurl to generate sufficient force to jump.

It had been suggested that the pronotal "helmet" could be serial homologues of insect wings, but this interpretation has been refuted by several later studies, such as Mikó et al. (2012) and Yoshizawa (2012). There are several varieties of hemiptera with built-in camouflage, utilizing the growths as analogous disguises to "mimic thorns, twigs, seeds and fungi, as well as caterpillar frass, ants and wasps."

Treehopper nymphs can be recognised by the tube-like ninth abdominal segment, through which the tenth and eleventh segments can be exerted in defence or to provide honeydew to other animals (explained further in the next section). The tube is longer (compared to the rest of the body) in early instars compared to late instars.

== Ecology ==
Treehoppers have pointy, tube-shaped mouthparts that they use to pierce plant stems and feed upon sap. The young can frequently be found on herbaceous shrubs and grasses, while the adults more often frequent hardwood tree species. Excess sap becomes concentrated as honeydew, which often attracts ants. Some species have a well-developed ant mutualism, and these species are normally gregarious as well, which attracts more ants. The ants provide protection from predators. Treehoppers mimic natural formations to prevent predators from spotting them.

Others have formed mutualisms with wasps, such as Parachartergus apicalis. Even geckos form mutualistic relations with treehoppers, with whom they communicate by small vibrations of the abdomen.

Mutualisms are not done only for protection against predators. Nymphs of the treehopper Publilia concava have higher survivorship in the presence of ants even when predators are absent. This is suspected to be because uncollected honeydew leads to the growth of sooty mould, which may hinder excretion by treehoppers and photosynthesis by their host plants. Ant collection of honeydew is theorized to allow treehoppers to have to compete less and feed more, according to the feeding facilitation hypothesis.

Eggs are laid by the female with her saw-like ovipositor in slits cut into the cambium or live tissue of stems, though some species lay eggs on top of leaves or stems. The eggs may be parasitised by wasps, such as the tiny fairyflies (Mymaridae) and Trichogrammatidae. The females of some membracid species sit over their eggs to protect them from predators and parasites, and may buzz their wings at intruders. The females of some gregarious species work together to protect each other's eggs. In at least one species, Publilia modesta, mothers serve to attract ants when nymphs are too small to produce much honeydew. Some other species make feeding slits for the nymphs.

Most species are innocuous to humans, although a few are considered minor pests, such as Umbonia crassicornis (a thorn bug), the three-cornered alfalfa hopper (Spissistilus festinus), and the buffalo treehopper (Stictocephala bisonia), which has been introduced to Europe. The cowbug Oxyrachis tarandus has been recorded as a pest of Withania somnifera in India.

== Systematics ==
The diversity of treehoppers has been little researched, and their systematic arrangement is tentative. It seems three main lineages can be distinguished; the Endoiastinae are the most ancient treehoppers, still somewhat resembling cicadas. Centrotinae form the second group; they are somewhat more advanced but the pronotum still does not cover the scutellum in almost all of these. The Darninae, Heteronotinae, Membracinae and Smiliinae contain the most apomorphic treehoppers.

Several proposed subfamilies seem to be paraphyletic. Centronodinae and Nicomiinae might need to be merged into the Centrotinae to result in a monophyletic group.

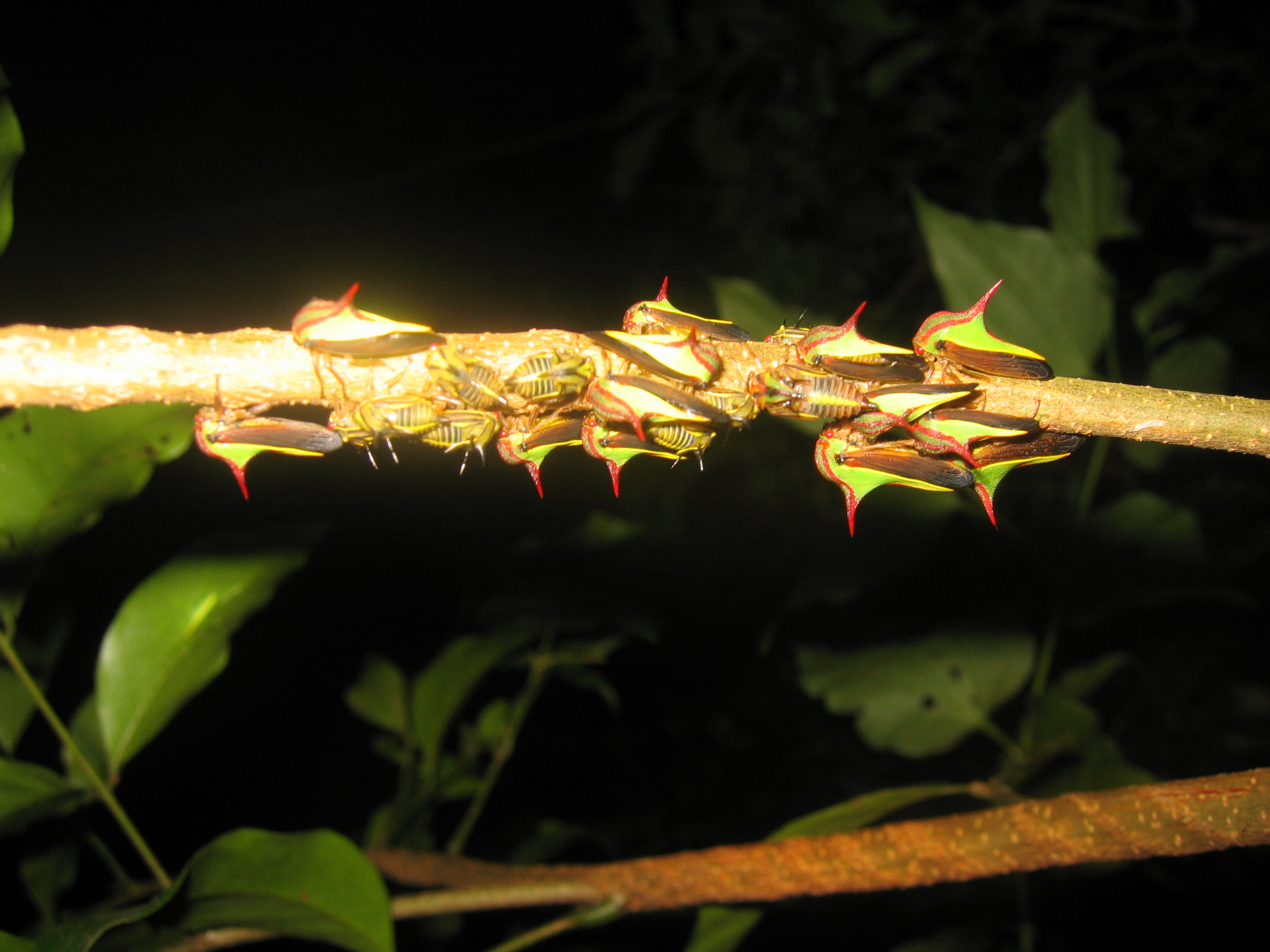
Adults and nymphs of Umbonia in Monteverde, Costa Rica

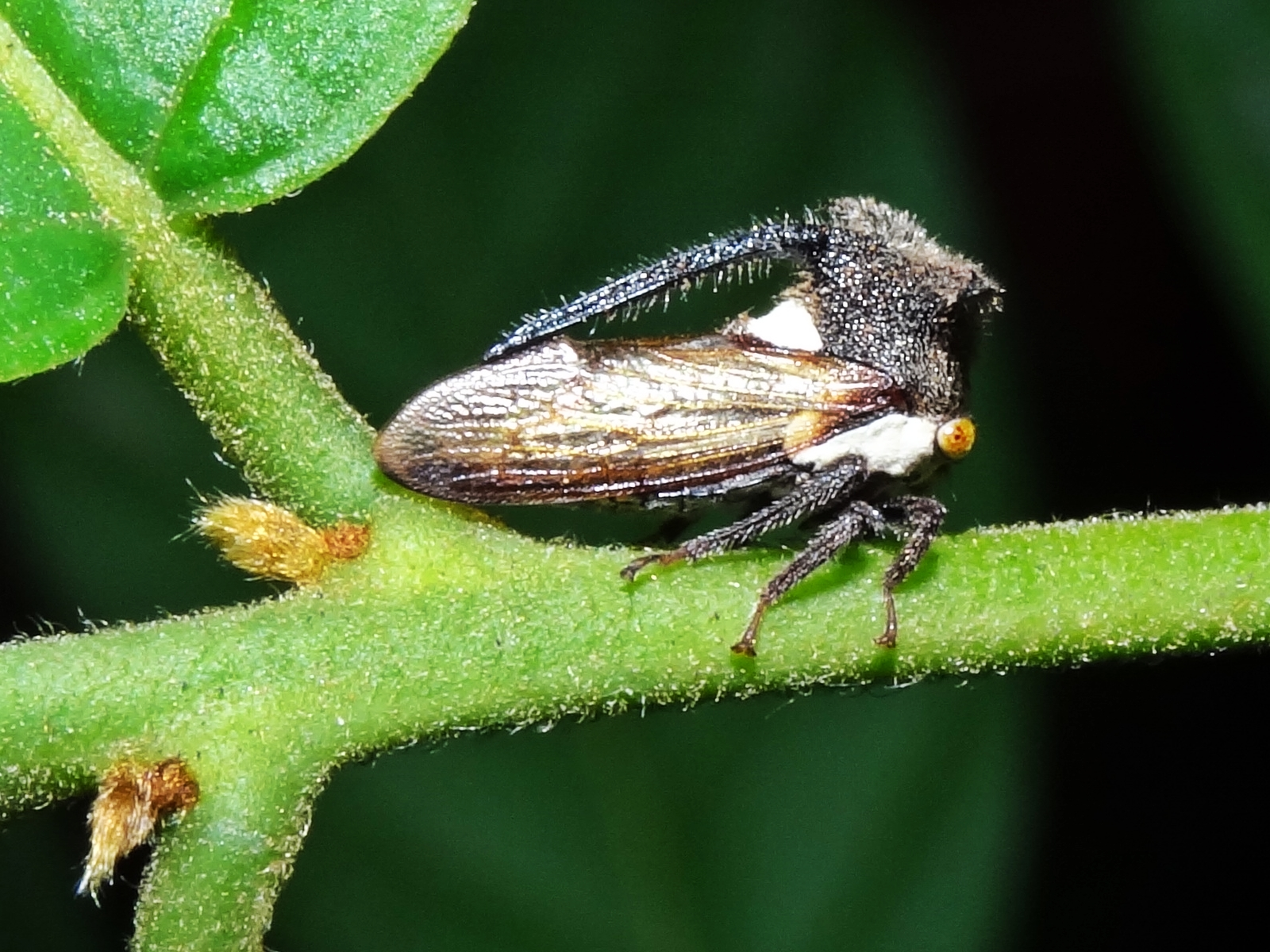
Horned treehopper in Tumkur, India

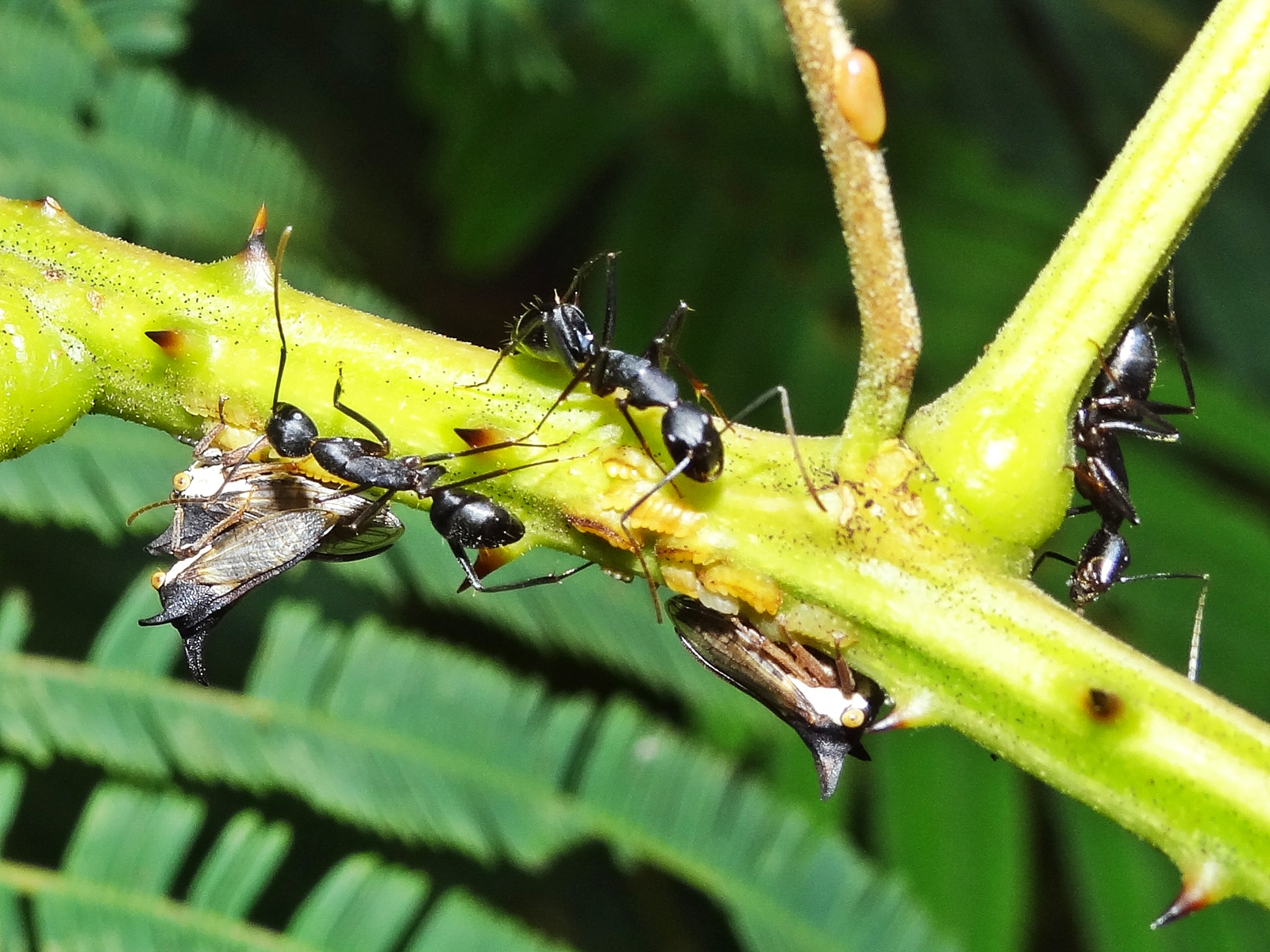
Treehoppers mating; also some nymphs. Mutualistic carpenter ants present. Hyderabad, India

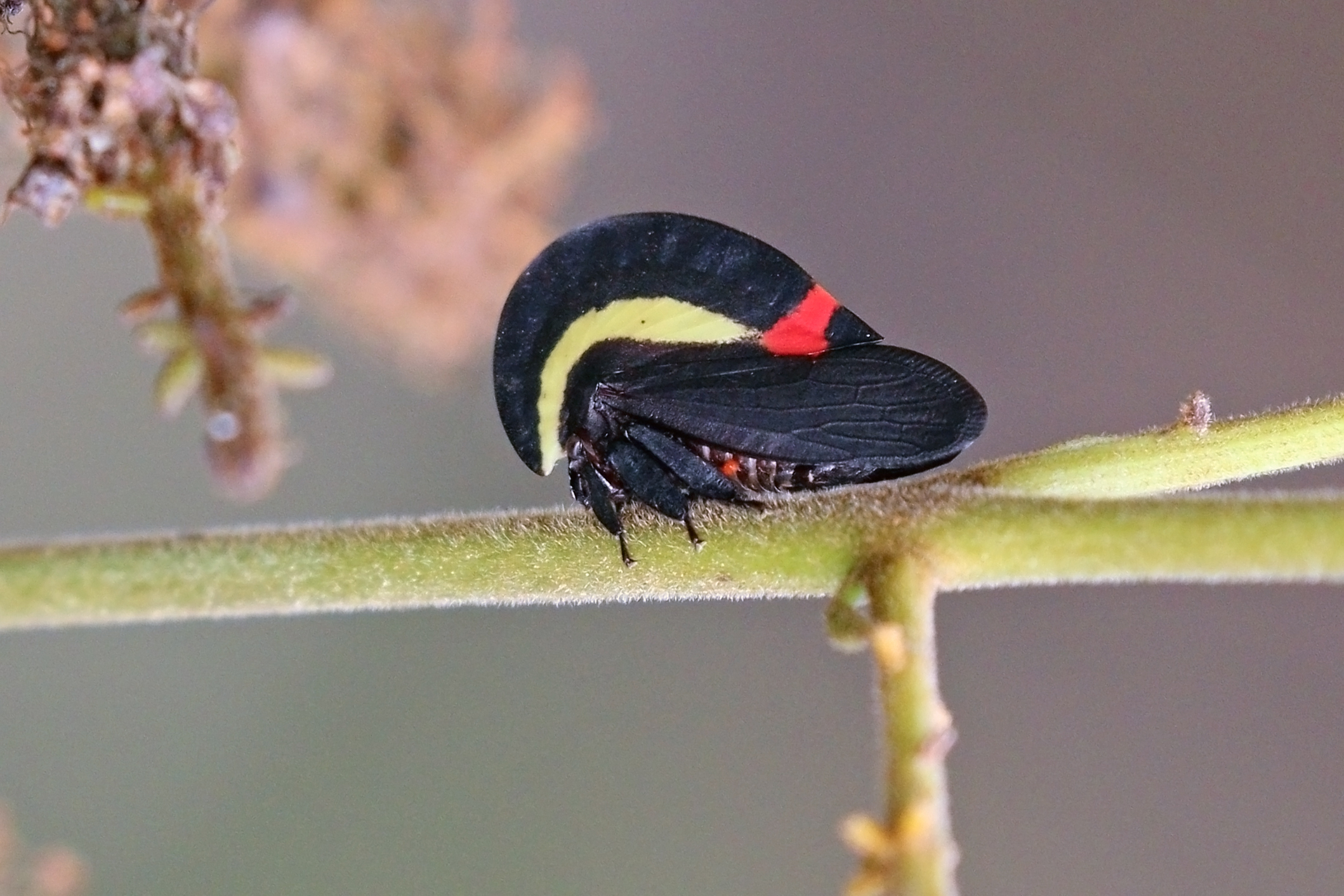
Membracis sanguineoplaga
Pantanal, Brazil

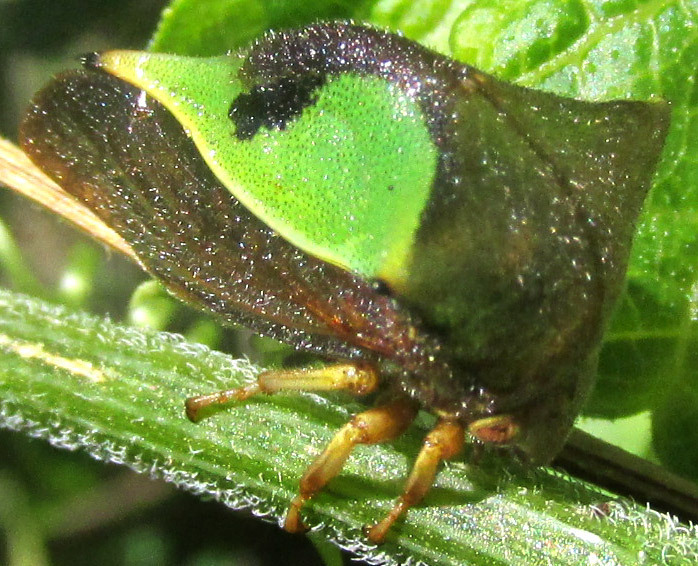
Hyphinoe camelus
Querétaro, Mexico
