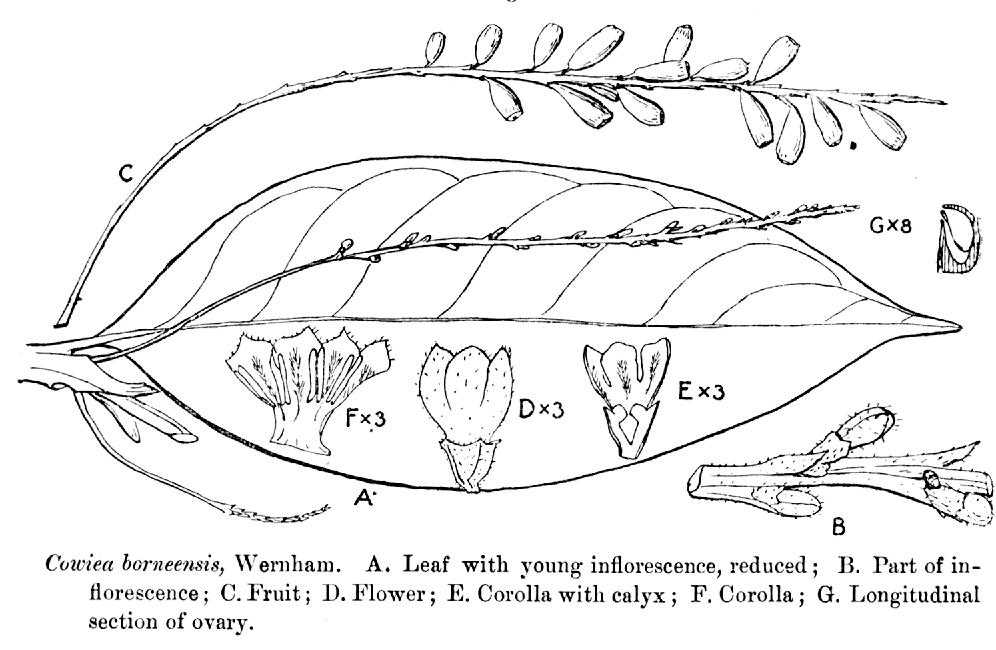
- Cowiea borneensis

Scientific classification
- Kingdom: Plantae
- Clade: Embryophytes
- Clade: Tracheophytes
- Clade: Spermatophytes
- Clade: Angiosperms
- Clade: Eudicots
- Clade: Asterids
- Order: Gentianales
- Family: Rubiaceae
- Genus: Cowiea; Wernham

Type species
- Cowiea borneensis Wernham

= Cowiea =

Genus of plants

Cowiea is a genus of flowering plants in the family Rubiaceae. It is native to Borneo and the Philippines.

== Species ==
- Cowiea borneensis Wernham - Sabah
- Cowiea philippinensis Merr. - Philippines
