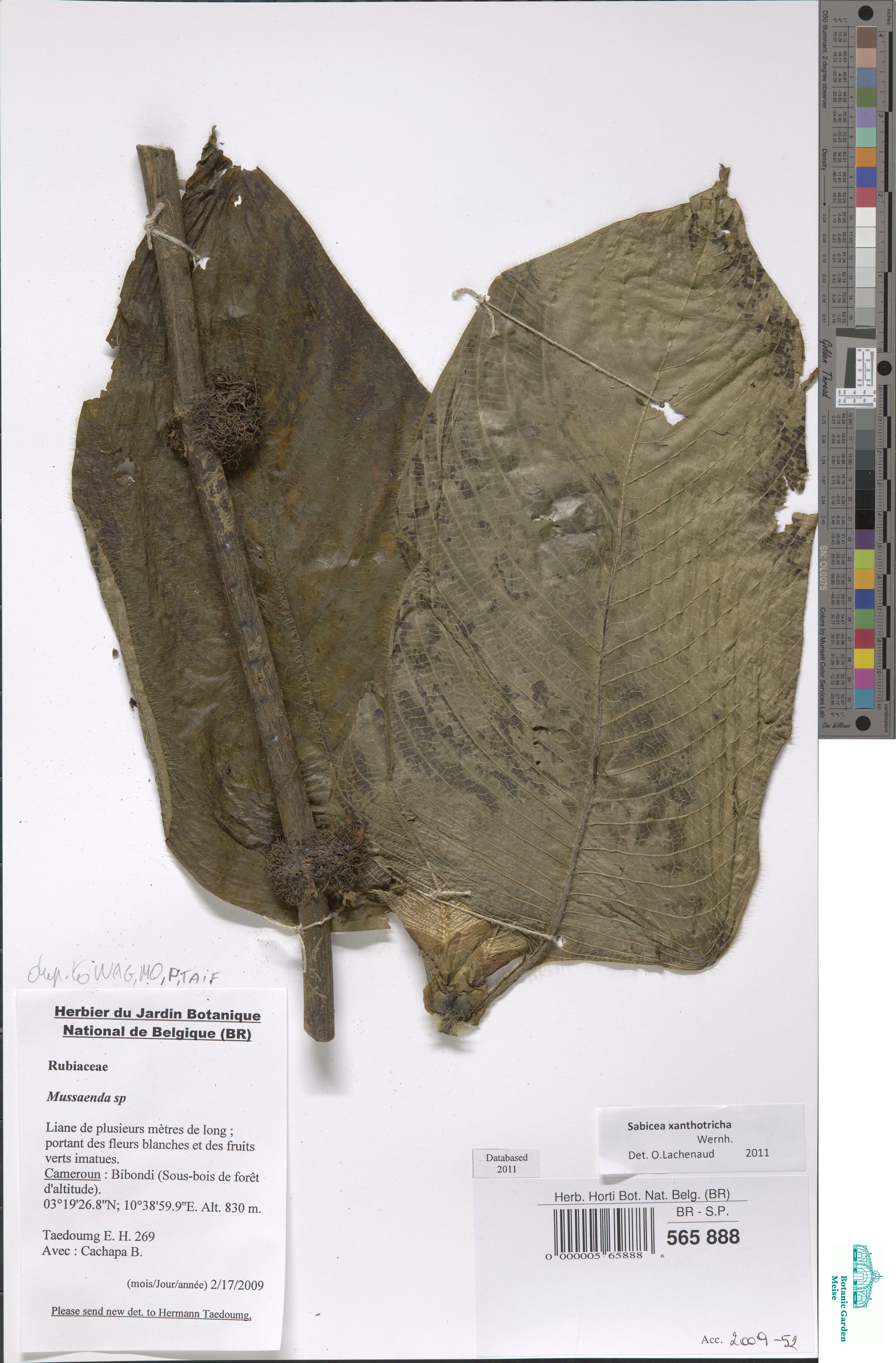

Conservation status
- Endangered (IUCN 3.1)

Scientific classification
- Kingdom: Plantae
- Clade: Tracheophytes
- Clade: Angiosperms
- Clade: Eudicots
- Clade: Asterids
- Order: Gentianales
- Family: Rubiaceae
- Genus: Sabicea
- Species: S. xanthotricha

Binomial name
- Sabicea xanthotricha Wernham

= Sabicea xanthotricha =

Species of plant

Sabicea xanthotricha is a species of plant in the family Rubiaceae. It is found in Cameroon and Nigeria. Its natural habitat is subtropical or tropical moist lowland forests. It is threatened by habitat loss.
