= Sabicea amazonensis =

Scientific classification
- Kingdom: Plantae
- Clade: Tracheophytes
- Clade: Angiosperms
- Clade: Eudicots
- Clade: Asterids
- Order: Gentianales
- Family: Rubiaceae
- Genus: Sabicea
- Species: S. amazonensis

Binomial name
- Sabicea amazonensis Wernham

Species of plant

Sabicea amazonensis is a species of plant in the family Rubiaceae. It is found in tropical South America. Zemagho, et al. assign Sabicea amazonensis to their subgenus, Sabicea Aubl. subgenus Sabicea, on the basis of morphological characters.

There are no synonyms.

== Description ==
Sabicea amazonensis is a twining creeper which has equal to almost equal leaves. The stipules are entire to two-toothed and less than 15 mm long. The bracts are free or almost free. The inflorescence is unbranched and sessile or almost sessile. The calyx lobes are less than 3 mm long. The corolla throat is covered in short trichomes. The ovary is 3–5 locular, and the mature red fruits are sessile.

== Distribution ==
It is native to Brazil, Colombia, Peru, Suriname, and Venezuela.
