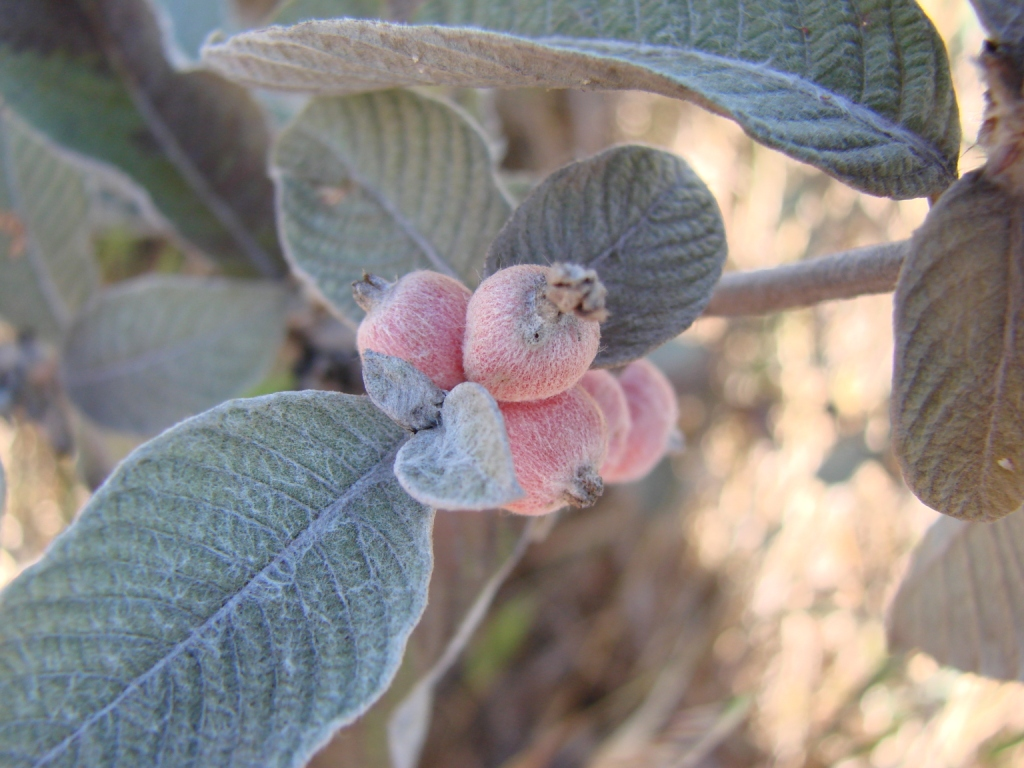

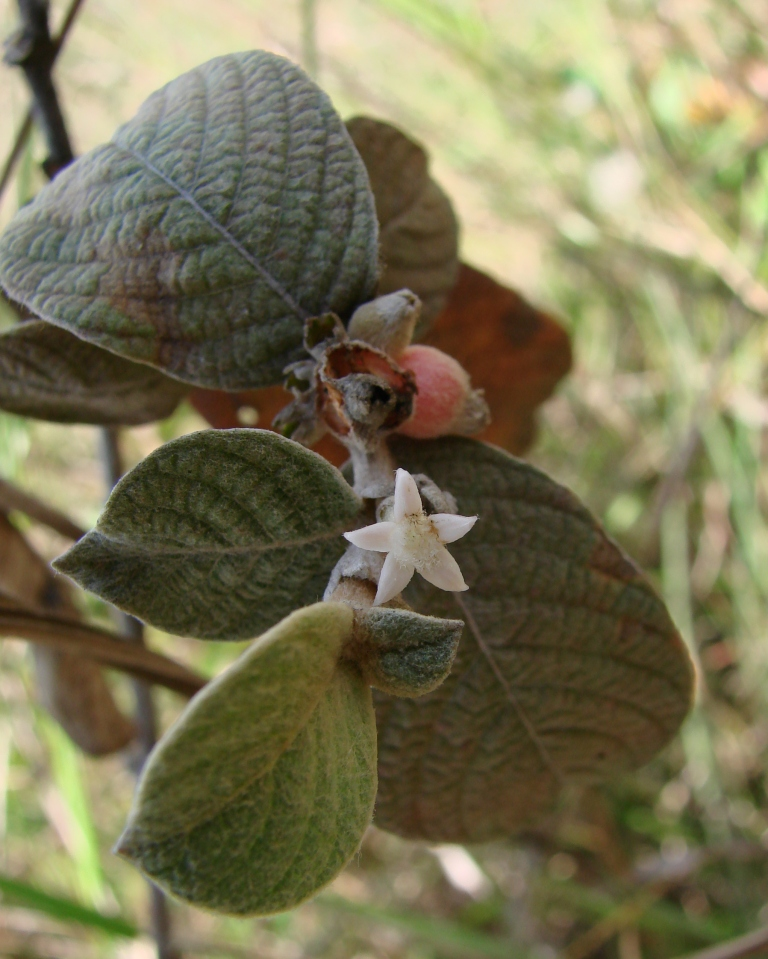

Scientific classification
- Kingdom: Plantae
- Clade: Tracheophytes
- Clade: Angiosperms
- Clade: Eudicots
- Clade: Asterids
- Order: Gentianales
- Family: Rubiaceae
- Genus: Sabicea
- Species: S. brasiliensis

Binomial name
- Sabicea brasiliensis Wernham

= Sabicea brasiliensis =

Species of plant

Sabicea brasiliensis is a species of woodvine in the family Rubiaceae, and is native to Brazil, and also to Bolivia. There are no synonyms. Chemical compounds isolated from its roots have been shown to have significant anti-inflammatory effects.

== Description ==
Wernham describes it as an erect shrub. However, Standley describes it as a "large, woody vine". According to Wernham, the upper surface of its leaves is densely hairy, and the leaves narrow gradually to their base, making them almost without a stalk. Standley, however, describes the leaves as being stalked, with densely white woolly matting on the undersurface, and covered in weak hairs on the upper surface. The flowers, too, are covered in a dense white woolly matting, and the inflorescence is a dense sessile head. The calyx lobes are triangular. The stamens are inserted at the mouth of the corolla tube, and both the ovary and stigma are 5-merous.

Its type specimen, k000172688 was collected in 1827 by William John Burchell.
