= Xyleborinus exiguus =

Scientific classification
- Kingdom: Animalia
- Phylum: Arthropoda
- Clade: Pancrustacea
- Class: Insecta
- Order: Coleoptera
- Suborder: Polyphaga
- Infraorder: Cucujiformia
- Superfamily: Curculionoidea
- Family: Curculionidae
- Subfamily: Scolytinae
- Genus: Xyleborinus
- Species: X. exiguus

Binomial name
- Xyleborinus exiguus (Walker, 1859)

Synonyms
- Bostrichus exiguus Walker, 1859; Xyleborinus exiguus (Walker): Maiti and Saha, 1986; Xyleborus muriceus Eichhoff, 1878; Xyleborus diversus Schedl, 1954; Xyleborus perexiguus Schedl, 1971; Xyleborus ankius Schedl, 1975; Xyleborinus diversus (Schedl 1954); Xyleborinus perexiguus (Schedl 1971); Xyleborinus ankius (Schedl 1975)

Species of beetle

Xyleborinus exiguus is a species of weevil widely distributed throughout the Old World tropics and introduced to African and South American countries.

== Distribution ==
It is native to India, Andaman Islands, Sri Lanka, Cambodia, China, Laos, Myanmar, Nepal, Taiwan, Thailand, Vietnam, Australia, Cook Islands, Micronesia, Fiji, Guam, Indonesia, Malaysia, Mariana Islands, New Guinea, Niue Island, Philippines, Samoa, Solomon Islands, Tahiti. It is also introduced to West African countries such as Angola, Cameroon, Congo, Equatorial Guinea, Gabon, Ghana, Ivory Coast, Zaire as well as in Central American countries: Costa Rica, and Panamá.

== Description ==
This small, elongate-cylindrical beetle is about 1.8 to 2.0 mm long. This weevil can be identified by the declivital face with interstriae 2 (region between stripes) which is unarmed by tubercles. Elytral apex is attenuate, with three pairs of large flattened tubercles. The declivital interstriae is flat, and the interstriae 2 is not impressed.

A polyphagous species, it is found from many host plants.

=== Host plants ===
- Afzelia
- Anacardium excelsum
- Anthocleista nobilis
- Artocarpus
- Bombax malabaricum
- Brosimum utile
- Caloncoba
- Canarium euphyllum
- Cinnamomum iners
- Dipterocarpus zeylanicus
- Durio zibethinus
- Eucalyptus deglupta
- Hevea brasiliensis
- Parkia speciosa
- Pterocarpus dalbergoides
- Quercus
- Samanea saman
- Staudtia stipitata
- Symphonia globulifera
- Terminalia bialata
- Trichilia
- Triplochiton scleroxylon
