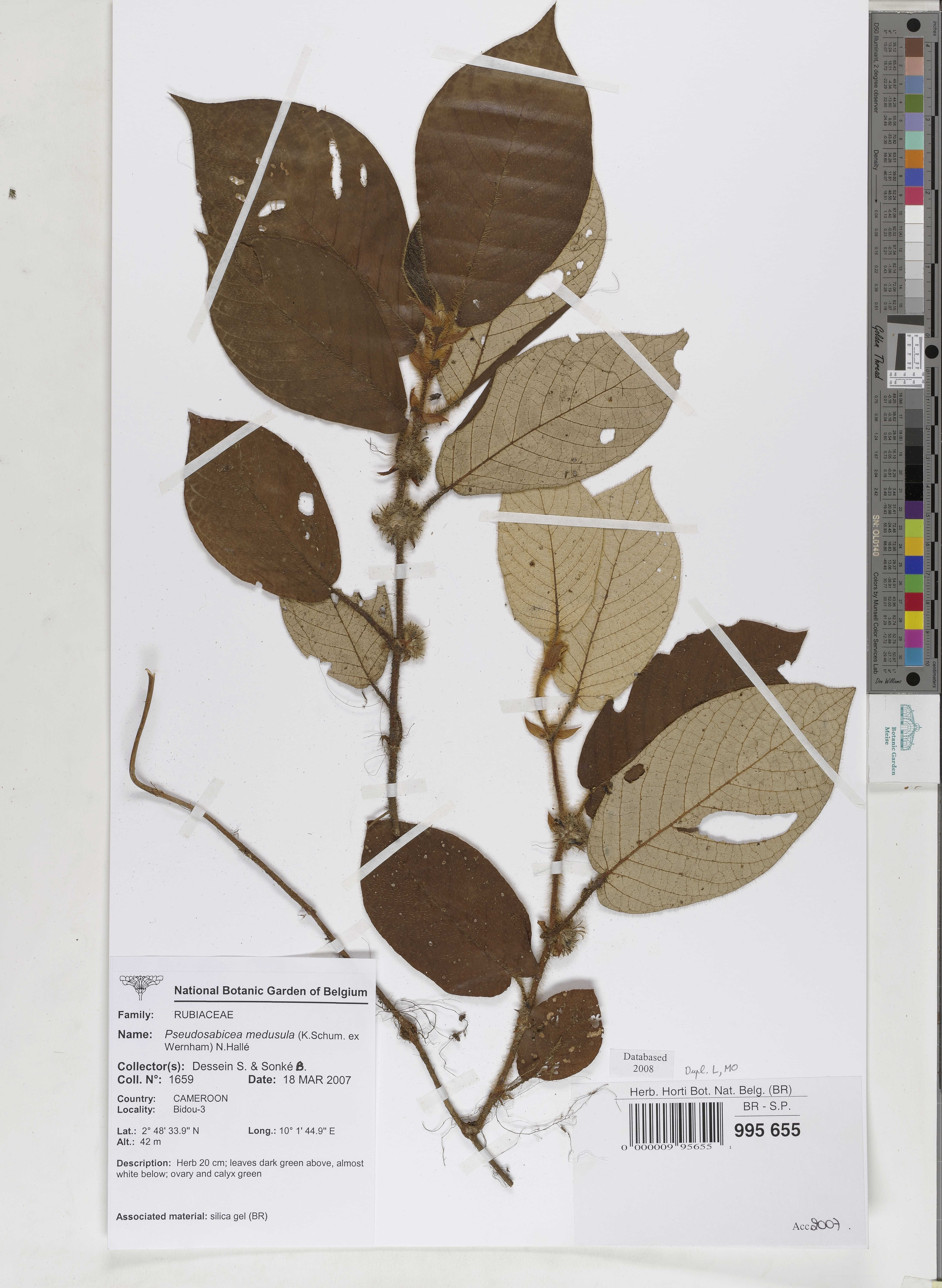

Conservation status
- Vulnerable (IUCN 3.1)

Scientific classification
- Kingdom: Plantae
- Clade: Tracheophytes
- Clade: Angiosperms
- Clade: Eudicots
- Clade: Asterids
- Order: Gentianales
- Family: Rubiaceae
- Genus: Sabicea
- Species: S. medusula

Binomial name
- Sabicea medusula K.Schum. ex Wernham

= Sabicea medusula =

Species of plant

Sabicea medusula is a species of plant in the family Rubiaceae. It is west-central tropical Africa. Its natural habitat is subtropical or tropical moist lowland forests. It is threatened by habitat loss.
