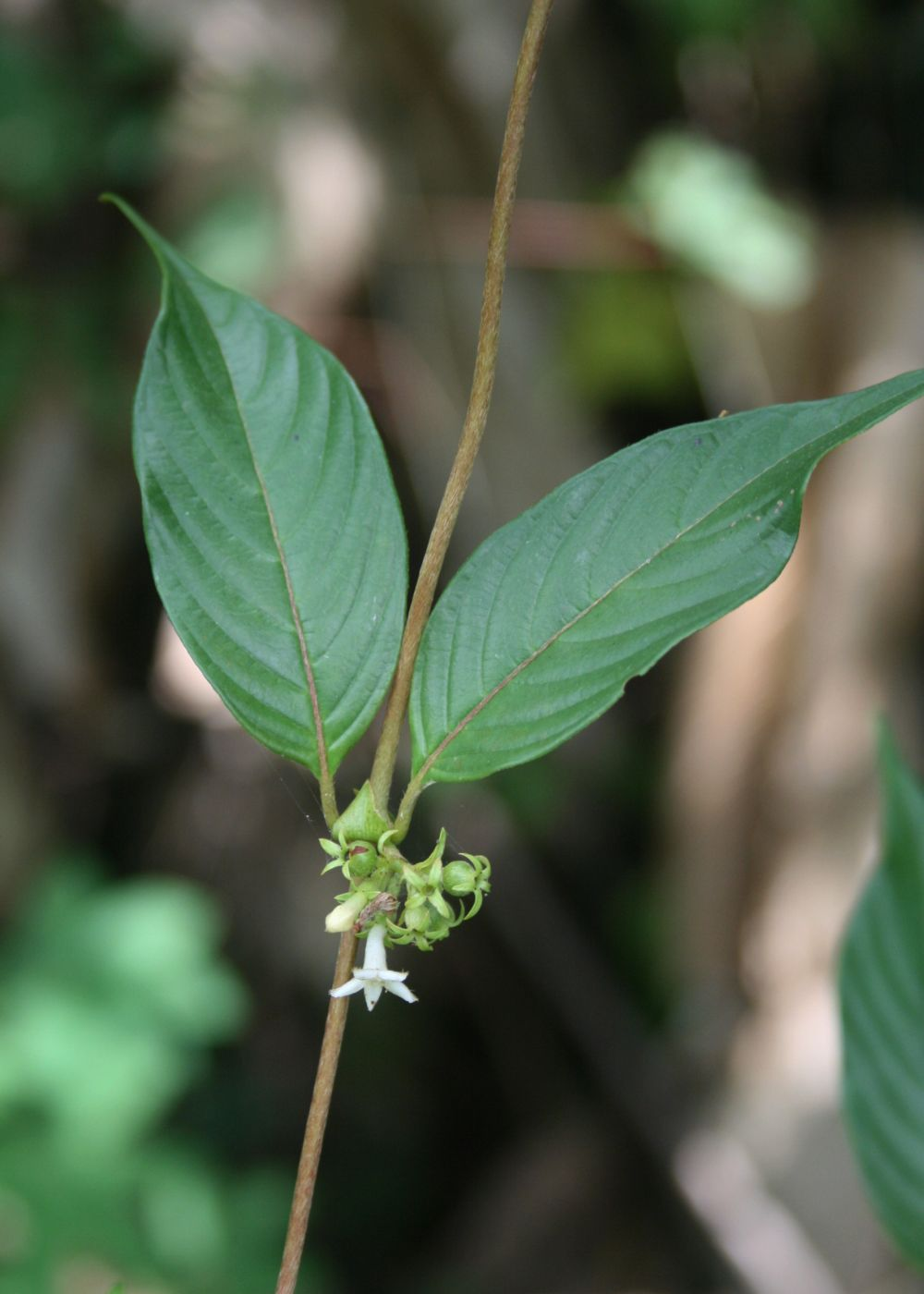
- Sabicea panamensis

Scientific classification
- Kingdom: Plantae
- Clade: Tracheophytes
- Clade: Angiosperms
- Clade: Eudicots
- Clade: Asterids
- Order: Gentianales
- Family: Rubiaceae
- Subfamily: Ixoroideae
- Tribe: Sabiceeae
- Genus: Sabicea; Aubl.

Species
- list Sabicea acuminata Baker; Sabicea amazonensis Wernham; Sabicea amomii Wernham; Sabicea angustifolia Boivin ex Wernham; Sabicea apocynacea (K.Schum.) Razafim., B.Bremer, Liede & Saleh A.Khan; Sabicea arborea K.Schum. Sabicea aristeguietae Steyerm. Sabicea aspera Aubl. Sabicea asperula (Ball) Wernham; Sabicea aurifodinae (N.Hallé) Razafim., B.Bremer, Liede & Saleh A.Khan; Sabicea bariensis Steyerm. Sabicea batesii Wernham; Sabicea becquetii (N.Hallé) Razafim., B.Bremer, Liede & Saleh A.Khan; Sabicea bequaertii De Wild. Sabicea bigerrica N.Hallé; Sabicea boliviensis Wernham; Sabicea brachiata Wernham; Sabicea brachycalyx Steyerm. Sabicea bracteolata Wernham; Sabicea brasiliensis Wernham; Sabicea brevipes Wernham; Sabicea bullata Zemagho, O.Lachenaud & Sonké; Sabicea burchellii Wernham; Sabicea calophylla Aspl. Sabicea calycina Benth. Sabicea cameroonensis Wernham; Sabicea caminata N.Hallé; Sabicea camporum Sprague; Sabicea cana Hook.f. Sabicea capitellata Benth. Sabicea carbunica N.Hallé; Sabicea cauliflora Hiern; Sabicea ceylanica Puff; Sabicea chocoana C.M.Taylor; Sabicea cinerea Aubl. Sabicea composita Wernham; Sabicea congensis Wernham; Sabicea cordata Hutch. & Dalziel; Sabicea cruciata Wernham; Sabicea crystallina (N.Hallé) Zemagho, O.Lachenaud & Sonké; Sabicea cuneata Rusby; Sabicea dewevrei De Wild. & T.Durand; Sabicea dewildemaniana Wernham; Sabicea dinklagei K.Schum. Sabicea discolor Stapf; Sabicea diversifolia Pers. Sabicea dubia Wernham; Sabicea duparquetiana Baill. ex Wernham; Sabicea entebbensis Wernham; Sabicea erecta Rusby; Sabicea exellii G.Taylor; Sabicea ferruginea (G.Don) Benth. Sabicea flagenioides Wernham; Sabicea floribunda K.Schum. Sabicea fulva Wernham; Sabicea fulvovenosa R.D.Good; Sabicea gabonica (Hiern) Hepper; Sabicea geantha Hiern; Sabicea geophiloides Wernham; Sabicea gigantostipula K.Schum. Sabicea gilletii De Wild. Sabicea glabrescens Benth. Sabicea globifera Hutch. & Dalziel; Sabicea golgothae O.Lachenaud & Zemagho; Sabicea goossensii De Wild. Sabicea gracilis Wernham; Sabicea grandifolia Steyerm. Sabicea grisea Cham. & Schltdl. Sabicea harleyae Hepper; Sabicea hierniana Wernham; Sabicea hirta Sw. Sabicea humilis S.Moore; Sabicea ingrata K.Schum. Sabicea jacfelicis (N.Hallé) Zemagho, O.Lachenaud & Sonké; Sabicea johnstonii K.Schum. ex Wernham; Sabicea klugii Standl. Sabicea lanata Hepper; Sabicea lanuginosa Wernham; Sabicea laxa Wernham; Sabicea leucocarpa (K.Krause) Mildbr. Sabicea liberica Wernham; Sabicea liesneri Steyerm. Sabicea longepetiolata De Wild. Sabicea loxothyrsus K.Schum. & Dinkl. ex Stapf; Sabicea mabouniensis O.Lachenaud & Zemagho; Sabicea mapiana Zemagho, O.Lachenaud & Sonké; Sabicea marojejyensis Razafim. & J.S.Mill. Sabicea mattogrossensis Wernham; Sabicea medusula K.Schum. ex Wernham; Sabicea mexicana Wernham; Sabicea mildbraedii Wernham; Sabicea mollis K.Schum. ex Wernham; Sabicea mollissima Benth. ex Wernham; Sabicea morillorum Steyerm. Sabicea mortehanii De Wild. Sabicea multibracteata J.B.Hall; Sabicea najatrix N.Hallé; Sabicea ndjoleensis Zemagho, O.Lachenaud & Sonké; Sabicea nobilis R.D.Good; Sabicea novogranatensis K.Schum. Sabicea oblongifolia (Miq.) Steyerm. Sabicea orientalis Wernham; Sabicea panamensis Wernham; Sabicea parmentierae Zemagho, O.Lachenaud & Sonké; Sabicea parva Wernham; Sabicea parviflora K.Schum. ex Wernham; Sabicea pearcei Wernham; Sabicea pedicellata Wernham; Sabicea pilosa Hiern; Sabicea proselyta (N.Hallé) Razafim., B.Bremer, Liede & Saleh A.Khan; Sabicea pseudocapitellata Wernham; Sabicea purpurea A.Rich. Sabicea pyramidalis L.Andersson; Sabicea romboutsii Bremek. Sabicea rosea Hoyle; Sabicea rufa Wernham; Sabicea sanguinosa (N.Hallé) Razafim., B.Bremer, Liede & Saleh A.Khan; Sabicea schaeferi Wernham; Sabicea schumanniana Büttner; Sabicea sciaphilantha Zemagho, O.Lachenaud & Sonké; Sabicea segregata Hiern; Sabicea setiloba Wernham; Sabicea seua Wernham; Sabicea smithii Wernham; Sabicea solitaria J.B.Hall; Sabicea speciosa K.Schum. Sabicea stellaris Dwyer; Sabicea sthenula (N.Hallé) Razafim., B.Bremer, Liede & Saleh A.Khan; Sabicea stipularioides Wernham; Sabicea subinvolucrata Wernham; Sabicea surinamensis Bremek. Sabicea talbotii Wernham; Sabicea tchapensis K.Krause; Sabicea tersifolia (N.Hallé) Zemagho, O.Lachenaud & Sonké; Sabicea thomensis Joffroy; Sabicea thyrsiflora L.Andersson; Sabicea tillettii Steyerm. Sabicea tomentosa A.Rich. Sabicea trailii Wernham; Sabicea trianae Wernham; Sabicea trigemina K.Schum. Sabicea umbellata (Ruiz & Pav.) Pers. Sabicea urbaniana Wernham; Sabicea urceolata Hepper; Sabicea urniformis Zemagho, O.Lachenaud & Sonké; Sabicea velutina Benth. Sabicea venezuelensis Steyerm. Sabicea venosa Benth. Sabicea verticillata Wernham; Sabicea villosa Willd. ex Schult. Sabicea vogelii Benth. Sabicea xanthotricha Wernham

= Sabicea =

Genus of plants

Sabicea is a genus of flowering plants in the family Rubiaceae. They are known commonly as the woodvines. The type species is Sabicea cinerea. There are about 145 species. Most are distributed in tropical Africa and South America.

Species include:

- Sabicea batesii
- Sabicea cinerea Aubl. – largeflower woodvine
- Sabicea medusula
- Sabicea pedicellata
- Sabicea pyramidalis L. Andersson
- Sabicea stenantha K.Krause
- Sabicea villosa Willd. ex Roem. & Schult. – woolly woodvine
- Sabicea xanthotricha Wernham
