= Sabicea amomii =

Scientific classification
- Kingdom: Plantae
- Clade: Embryophytes
- Clade: Tracheophytes
- Clade: Spermatophytes
- Clade: Angiosperms
- Clade: Eudicots
- Clade: Asterids
- Order: Gentianales
- Family: Rubiaceae
- Genus: Sabicea
- Species: S. amomii

Binomial name
- Sabicea amomii Wernham

Species of plant

Sabicea amomii is a species of woodvine in the family Rubiaceae, which is native to Cameroon.

== Description ==
Wernham describes the vine as being close to S. venosa, but differing in its leaf-venation, its inflorescence and its longer calyx lobes. It has leaves which are about 8 cm by 4 cm, on stalks from 1 cm to more than 3 cm long. The stipules are about 5 mm long and 4 mm wide at the base. The peduncles are about 6 mm and the bracts 5 mm by 1.2 mm, with flowers on pedicels nearly 3 mm long. The calyx lobes are up to 5 mm long, and the ovary is slightly greater than 1 mm in depth. The corolla is about 1 cm long.

The type specimen, BM000820046 (collected by George Latimer Bates at Bitye in the Yaoundé district), is annotated as having been found climbing in Amomum-thicket by a stream within a forest (thereby giving rise to the species epithet, amomii) and having a dark-greenish-purple corolla.
