= Temnopteryx =

Temnopteryx may refer to:

- Temnopteryx (cockroach)
- Temnopteryx (plant)
