= Stipularia (disambiguation) =

Stipularia may refer to:

- Stipularia, a genus of plants in the family Rubiaceae
- Stipularia, a genus of plants in the family Caryophyllaceae, synonym of Spergularia
- Stipularia, a genus of plants in the family Ranunculaceae, synonym of Thalictrum
