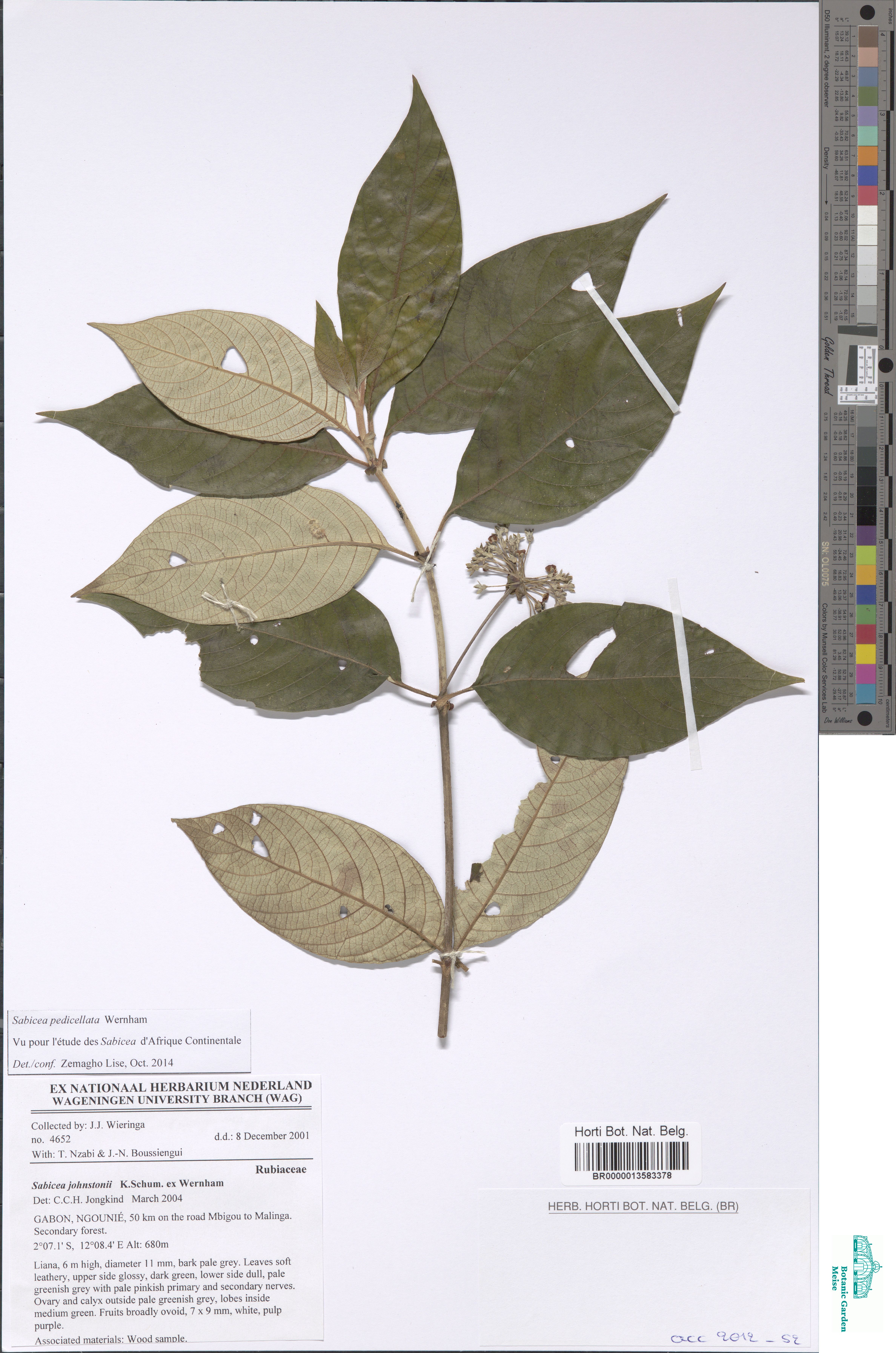

Conservation status
- Vulnerable (IUCN 3.1)

Scientific classification
- Kingdom: Plantae
- Clade: Tracheophytes
- Clade: Angiosperms
- Clade: Eudicots
- Clade: Asterids
- Order: Gentianales
- Family: Rubiaceae
- Genus: Sabicea
- Species: S. pedicellata

Binomial name
- Sabicea pedicellata Wernham

= Sabicea pedicellata =

Species of plant

Sabicea pedicellata is a species of plant in the family Rubiaceae. It is found from southern Nigeria to Cameroon. Its natural habitat is subtropical or tropical moist lowland forests. It is threatened by habitat loss.
