= Anthocleista amplexicaulis =

Conservation status
- Least Concern (IUCN 3.1)

Scientific classification
- Kingdom: Plantae
- Clade: Embryophytes
- Clade: Tracheophytes
- Clade: Angiosperms
- Clade: Eudicots
- Clade: Asterids
- Order: Gentianales
- Family: Gentianaceae
- Genus: Anthocleista
- Species: A. amplexicaulis

Binomial name
- Anthocleista amplexicaulis Baker.

Species of flowering plant

Anthocleista amplexicaulis is a species of plant in the Gentianaceae family. It is found in Madagascar. It is a small to large tree that grows in evergreen forests.

== Description ==
Anthocleista amplexicaulis is a small to large tree that can grow up to 12 meters (39 ft) high. It has small, woody branches with leaves that can be over 1 foot (0.30 m) long and 5 inches (13 cm) wide.

== Taxonomy ==
Anthocleista amplexicaulis was first named and described in 1887 by John Gilbert Baker.
