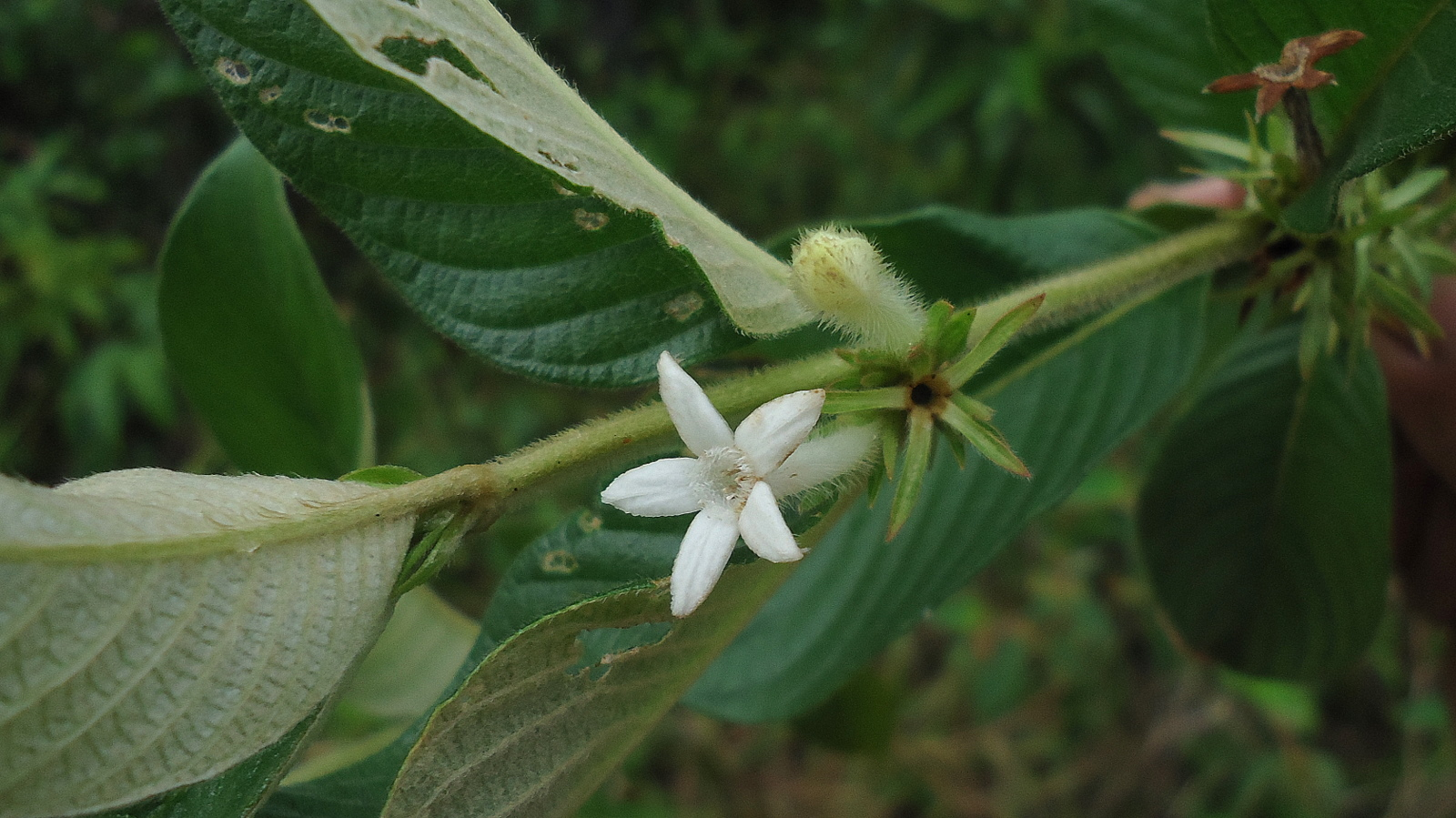

Scientific classification
- Kingdom: Plantae
- Clade: Tracheophytes
- Clade: Angiosperms
- Clade: Eudicots
- Clade: Asterids
- Order: Gentianales
- Family: Rubiaceae
- Genus: Sabicea
- Species: S. cinerea

Binomial name
- Sabicea cinerea Aubl.

= Sabicea cinerea =

Species of plant

Sabicea cinerea, the largeflower woodvine, is a species of flowering plant in the family Rubiaceae. It is a perennial dicot with both vine and shrub growth habits. It is a native plant of Puerto Rico.
