= Sabicea villosa =

Scientific classification
- Kingdom: Plantae
- Clade: Tracheophytes
- Clade: Angiosperms
- Clade: Eudicots
- Clade: Asterids
- Order: Gentianales
- Family: Rubiaceae
- Genus: Sabicea
- Species: S. villosa

Binomial name
- Sabicea villosa Willd. ex Roem. & Schult.

Species of plant

Sabicea villosa, the woolly woodvine, is a species of flowering plant in the family Rubiaceae. It is a perennial dicot with both vine and shrub growth habits that prefers wetlands locations. It is a native plant of Puerto Rico, Central America and South America.

Sabicea villosa grows in the rainforest ecosystem on Barro Colorado Island in the Panama Canal that is currently being studied by scientists from the Smithsonean Tropical Research Institute.
