= Sabicea stenantha =

Conservation status
- Data Deficient (IUCN 3.1)

Scientific classification
- Kingdom: Plantae
- Clade: Tracheophytes
- Clade: Angiosperms
- Clade: Eudicots
- Clade: Asterids
- Order: Gentianales
- Family: Rubiaceae
- Genus: Sabicea
- Species: S. stenantha

Binomial name
- Sabicea stenantha K.Krause

Species of plant

Sabicea stenantha is a species of plant in the family Rubiaceae. It is endemic to Ecuador.
