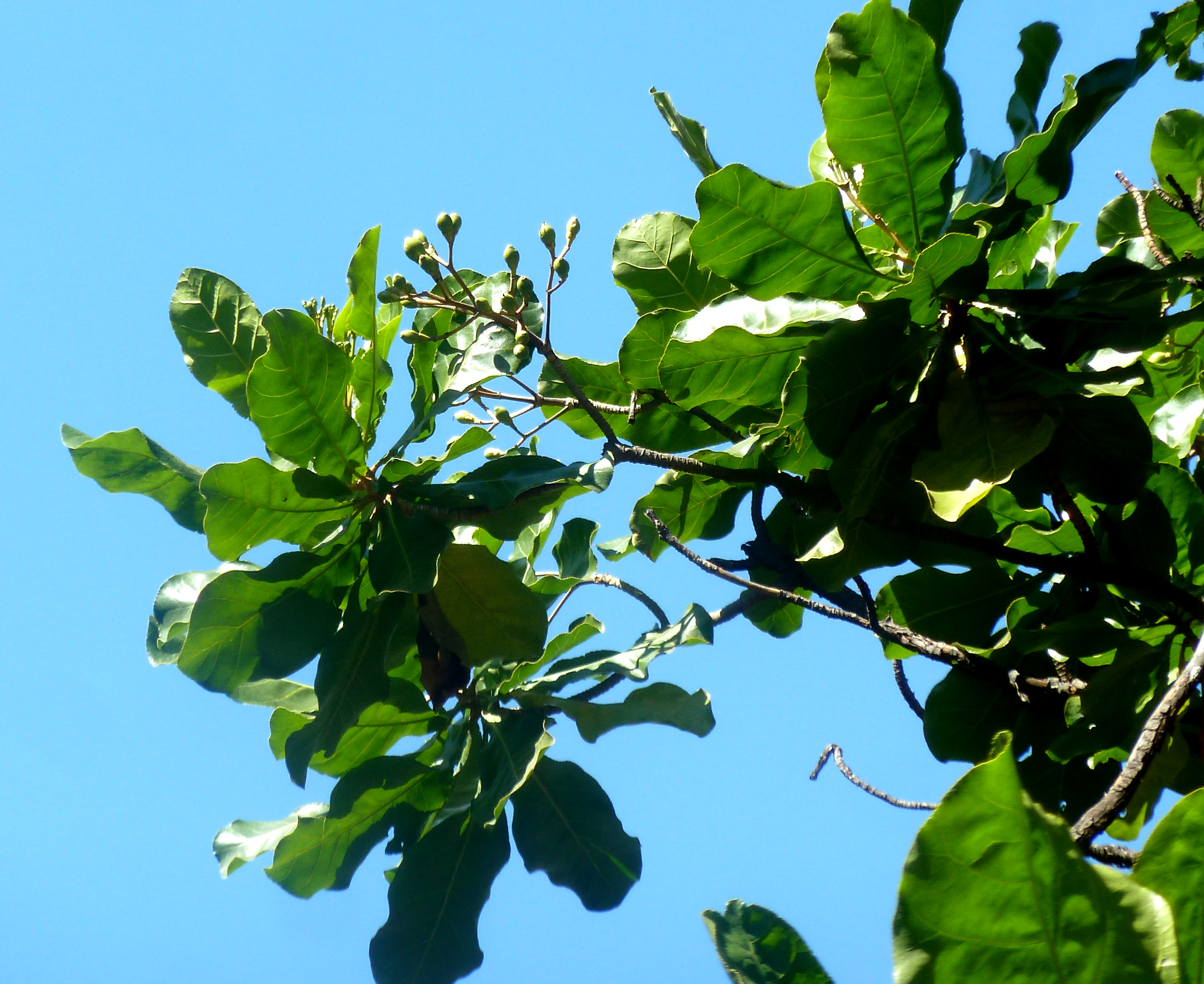

Conservation status
- Least Concern (IUCN 3.1)

Scientific classification
- Kingdom: Plantae
- Clade: Tracheophytes
- Clade: Angiosperms
- Clade: Eudicots
- Clade: Asterids
- Order: Gentianales
- Family: Gentianaceae
- Genus: Anthocleista
- Species: A. grandiflora

Binomial name
- Anthocleista grandiflora Gilg

Synonyms
- Anthocleista insignis Galpin; Anthocleista keniensis Summerh.; Anthocleista orientalis Gilg; Anthocleista pulcherrima Gilg; Anthocleista scheffleri Gilg ex G.Scheffler; Anthocleista zambesiaca Baker

= Anthocleista grandiflora =

Forest fever tree

Species of flowering plant

Anthocleista grandiflora is a species of flowering plant of the family Gentianaceae. Commonly referred to as the forest fever tree. It is a tall, slender tree up to 30 m with a preference for forests in high rainfall areas. The leaves are very large, up to 100 cm x 50 cm, arranged in terminal clusters.

== Range and habitat ==
It is native to the mountains and escarpments of eastern Africa, from Uganda and Kenya in the north to South Africa and Eswatini in the south. In Zimbabwe it is limited to the Eastern Highlands and in South Africa it occurs mostly along rivers in and below the escarpment, and less often in lowveld riparian fringes. It is the only member of the Gentianaceae that reaches tree size in South Africa.

== Uses ==
Anthocleista grandiflora is harvested locally for its wood, leaves, and bark to be used as timber, firewood, and medicine. It is also planted as an ornamental tree.

The soft wood is suitable for making veneer, plywood, hardboard, particle board and pulpwood.

In English it is commonly known as forest fever tree, forest big-leaf, or cabbage tree. Common names in other languages include:

- Afrikaans: grootblaarboom
- Kikuyu: mutunguru
- Kipsigis: sagalituet
- Meru: mutete
- Swahili: mkungu-maji or mtambuu-mwitu
- Venda: mueneene
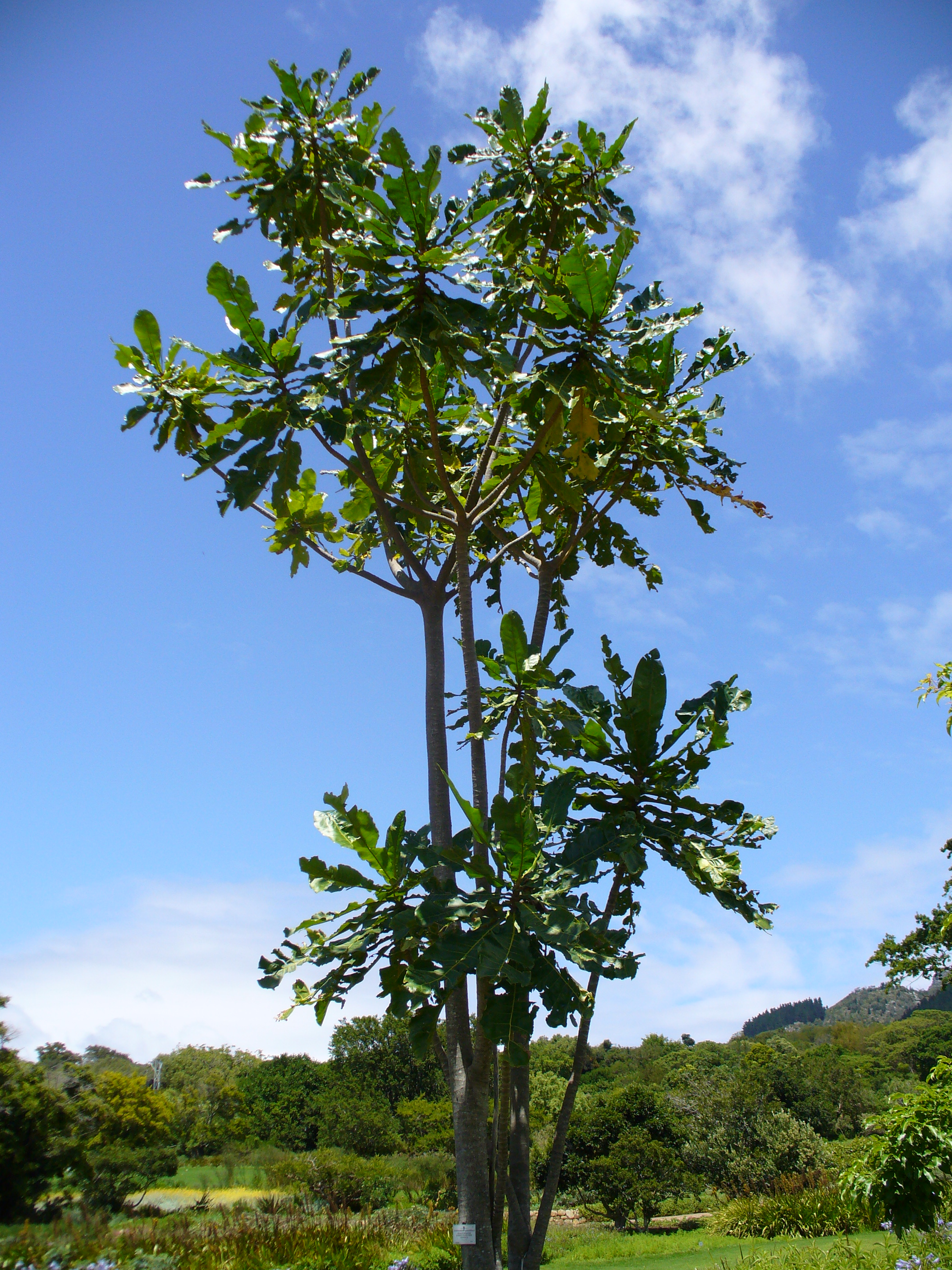

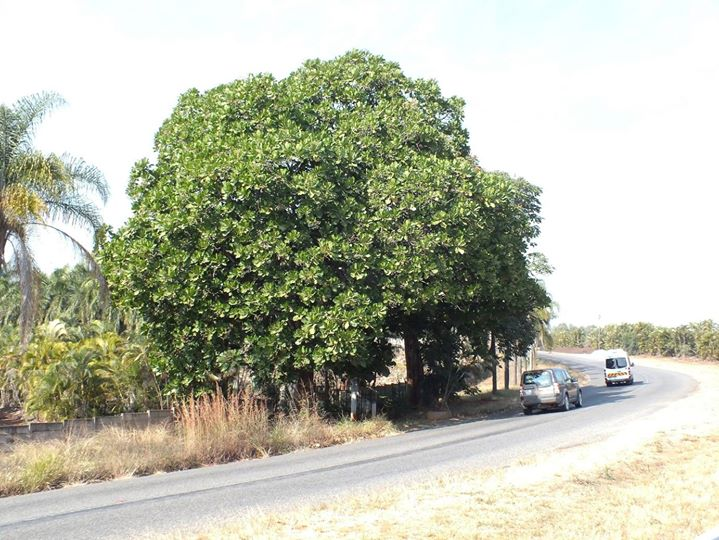
