= Anthocleista inermis =

Conservation status
- Data Deficient (IUCN 3.1)

Scientific classification
- Kingdom: Plantae
- Clade: Tracheophytes
- Clade: Angiosperms
- Clade: Eudicots
- Clade: Asterids
- Order: Gentianales
- Family: Gentianaceae
- Genus: Anthocleista
- Species: A. inermis

Binomial name
- Anthocleista inermis Engl.

Species of flowering plant

Anthocleista inermis is a species of flowering plant in the Gentianaceae family. It is a small tree that has been found from the Central African Republic and the Democratic Republic of the Congo

== Description ==
Anthocleista inermis is a small tree that grows between 25 and 30 feet (7.6 to 9.1 meters) tall. The small branches support upper leaves that are 1 foot long and 4 inches wide. The petioles are 1/4 to 1/3 of an inch long.

== Taxonomy ==
Anthocleista inermis was first named and described by Adolf Engler in 1886.
