= Xyleborinus andrewesi =

Scientific classification
- Kingdom: Animalia
- Phylum: Arthropoda
- Class: Insecta
- Order: Coleoptera
- Suborder: Polyphaga
- Infraorder: Cucujiformia
- Family: Curculionidae
- Genus: Xyleborinus
- Species: X. andrewesi

Binomial name
- Xyleborinus andrewesi (Blandford, 1896)

Synonyms
- Xyleborus andrewesi Blandford, 1896; Xyleborinus mimosae (Schedl, 1957); Xyleborus mimosae Schedl, 1957; Xyleborus persephenos Schedl, 1970; Xyleborus insolitus Bright, 1972; Cryptoxyleborus gracilior Browne, 1984

Species of beetle

Xyleborinus andrewesi is a species of weevil widely distributed throughout the Old World tropics and introduced to many New World countries.

== Distribution ==
It is native to Kenya, Seychelles, Zambia, Bangladesh, Myanmar, China, Japan, India, Indonesia, Malaysia, Nepal, Philippines, Sri Lanka, Taiwan, Thailand, Vietnam, New Guinea, Micronesia, and Papua New Guinea. It is found as an introduced species from Hawaii, Cuba, Jamaica, and United States.

== Description ==
This small, elongate-cylindrical beetle is about 2mm long. Body dark red-dish-brown in color. Elytra sub-acuminate. There are rows of many strong, acuminate tubercles found on the first and third interstriae.

A polyphagous species, it has been recorded from 59 host plants belong to 29 families.

=== Host plants ===
- Albizzia
- Anacardium
- Annona squamosa
- Araucaria cunninghamii
- Artocarpus dadah
- Breonia (syn. Anthocephalus)
- Buchenavia
- Canarium
- Cinnamomum
- Cryptocarya
- Garuga
- Isonandra
- Mallotus
- Mangifera indica
- Myristica indica
- Odina wodier
- Palaquium eliptica
- Pterospermum
- Randia
- Samanea saman
- Shorea
- Tectona grandis
