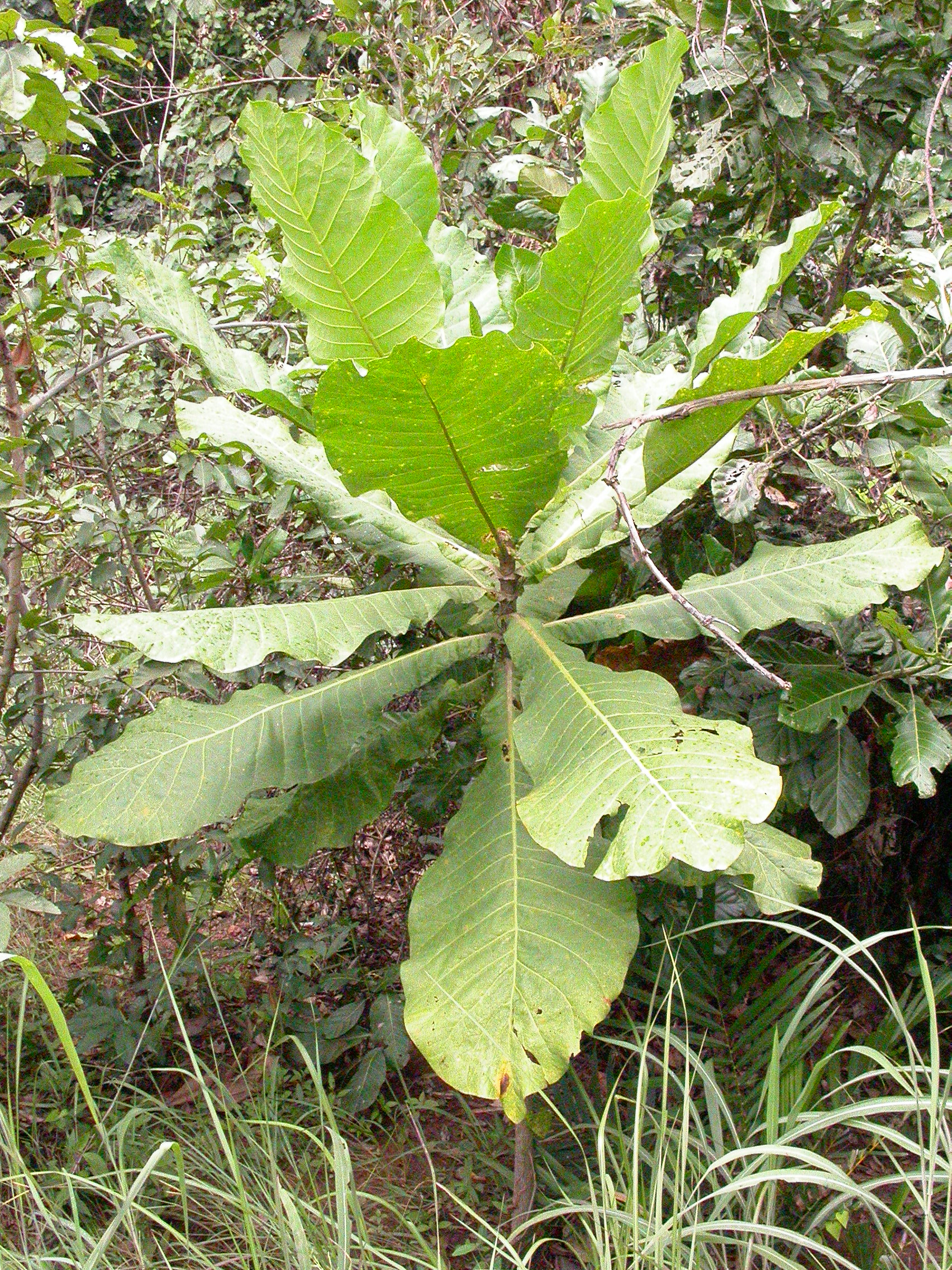

Conservation status
- Least Concern (IUCN 3.1)

Scientific classification
- Kingdom: Plantae
- Clade: Tracheophytes
- Clade: Angiosperms
- Clade: Eudicots
- Clade: Asterids
- Order: Gentianales
- Family: Gentianaceae
- Genus: Anthocleista
- Species: A. procera

Binomial name
- Anthocleista procera Lepr. ex Bureau

Synonyms
- Anthocleista frezoulsii A.Chev.; Anthocleista procera var. umbellata A.Chev

= Anthocleista procera =

Species of flowering plant

Anthocleista procera is a species of plant in the Gentianaceae family. It is a small tree that is found from West Tropical Africa.

== Description ==
Anthocleista procera is a small tree that typically grows between 6 and 20 meters tall. The spineless tree trunk is 15 to 50 centimeters in diameter. The leaves are 145 cm (57.1 inches) long and 45 cm (17.7 inches) wide. The flowers are typically a pale green.
