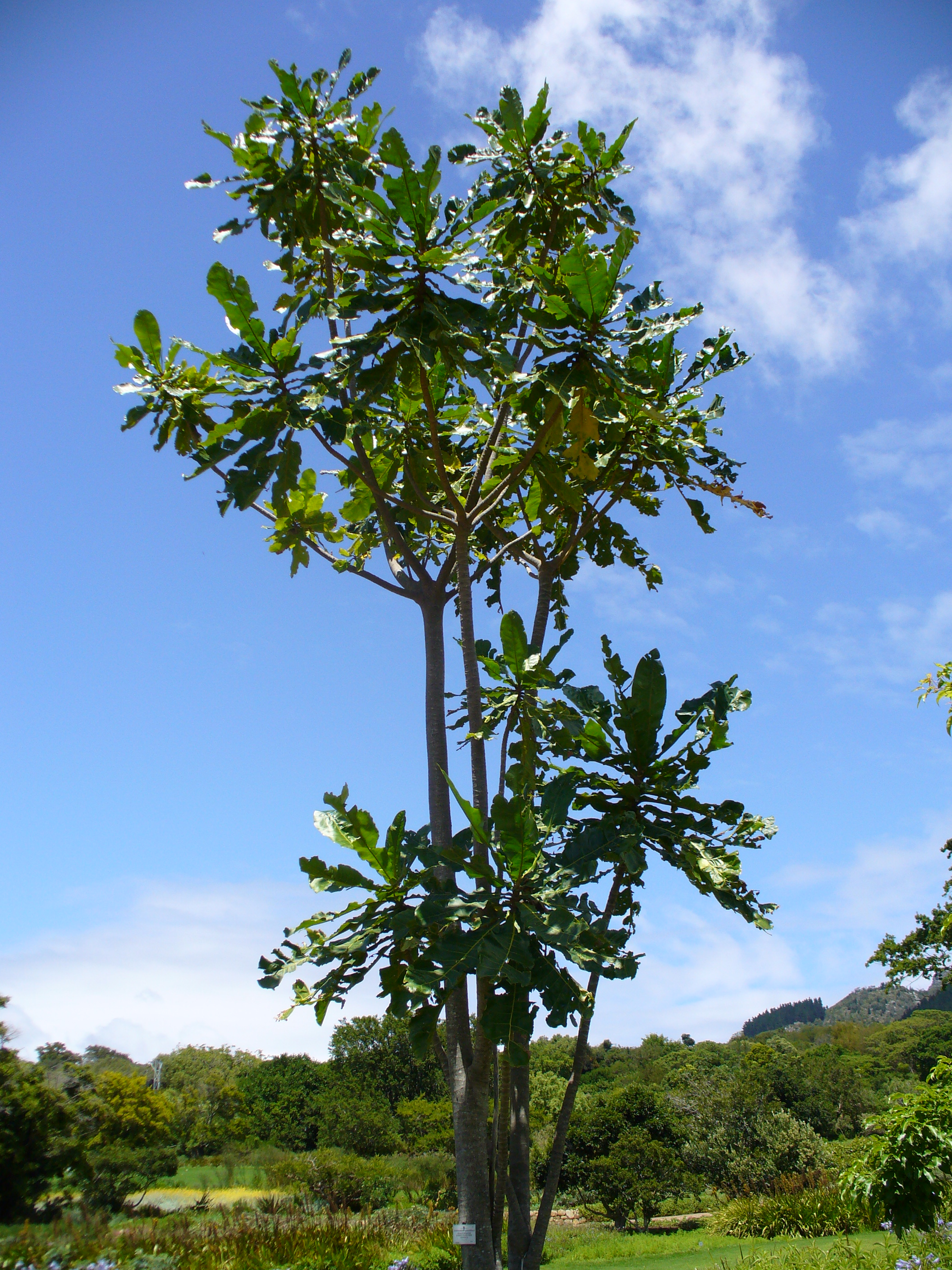
- Anthocleista grandiflora

Scientific classification
- Kingdom: Plantae
- Clade: Embryophytes
- Clade: Tracheophytes
- Clade: Spermatophytes
- Clade: Angiosperms
- Clade: Eudicots
- Clade: Asterids
- Order: Gentianales
- Family: Gentianaceae
- Tribe: Potalieae
- Subtribe: Potaliinae
- Genus: Anthocleista; Afzel. ex R.Br.

Species
- See text

= Anthocleista =

Genus of flowering plants

Anthocleista is a genus of tree- and shrub-like tropical plants in the subtribe Potaliinae in the Gentian family. There are between 14 and 16 species in the genus, native mainly to tropical Africa, including Madagascar and the Mascarene Islands. Anthocleista was once placed in the family Loganiaceae, but more recent molecular, morphological, and phytochemical evidence has placed the group well within the Gentianaceae.

== Uses ==
=== Traditional Medicine ===
In Africa, traditional use of the plants of this species is used in diseases like Diabetes, Obesity, Hypertension, Constipation (as laxative), Impotence, Fertility problems, Hyperprolactinemia, Sexual dysfunction, Malaria, Worms, STDs (Gonorrhea, Syphilis), Fever(as antipyretic), Rheumatism, Bronchitis, Typhoid Fever, Hemorrhoids, Hernia and Cancer. This review cited only in vitro and animal research in support of these putative health benefits.

== Species ==
As of June 2024, Plants of the World Online accepts 16 species for this genus:

- Anthocleista amplexicaulis Baker
- Anthocleista djalonensis A.Chev.
- Anthocleista grandiflora Gilg
- Anthocleista inermis Engl.
- Anthocleista laxiflora Baker
- Anthocleista liebrechtsiana De Wild. & T.Durand
- Anthocleista longifolia (Lam.) Boiteau
- Anthocleista madagascariensis Baker
- Anthocleista microphylla Wernham
- Anthocleista nobilis G.Don
- Anthocleista obanensis Wernham
- Anthocleista potalioides J.J.de Wilde
- Anthocleista procera Lepr. ex Bureau
- Anthocleista scandens Hook.f.
- Anthocleista schweinfurthii Gilg
- Anthocleista vogelii Planch.
