= Anthocleista djalonensis =

Conservation status
- Least Concern (IUCN 3.1)

Scientific classification
- Kingdom: Plantae
- Clade: Tracheophytes
- Clade: Angiosperms
- Clade: Eudicots
- Clade: Asterids
- Order: Gentianales
- Family: Gentianaceae
- Genus: Anthocleista
- Species: A. djalonensis

Binomial name
- Anthocleista djalonensis A.Chev

Synonyms
- Anthocleista kerstingii Gilg ex Volkens

Species of flowering plant

Anthocleista djalonensis is a species of plant in the Gentianaceae family. It is a small tree that is found from West Tropical Africa to South Chad.

== Description ==
Anthocleista djalonensis is a small tree that prefers savanna habitats.

== Distribution ==
Anthocleista djalonensis has been recorded from Togo, Sierra Leone, Senegal, Nigeria, Liberia, Guinea-Bissau, Guinea, Ghana, Côte d'Ivoire, Chad, Central African Republic, Cameroon, Burkina Faso and Benin.

== Taxonomy ==
Anthocleista djalonensis was first named and described in 1908 by Auguste Chevalier.
