= Anthocleista scandens =

Conservation status
- Vulnerable (IUCN 3.1)

Scientific classification
- Kingdom: Plantae
- Clade: Embryophytes
- Clade: Tracheophytes
- Clade: Angiosperms
- Clade: Eudicots
- Clade: Asterids
- Order: Gentianales
- Family: Gentianaceae
- Genus: Anthocleista
- Species: A. scandens

Binomial name
- Anthocleista scandens Hook.f.

Species of flowering plant

Anthocleista scandens is a species of plant in the family Gentianaceae. It is found in Cameroon, Equatorial Guinea, Nigeria, and São Tomé and Príncipe. Its natural habitats are subtropical or tropical moist lowland forests and subtropical or tropical moist montane forests. It is threatened by habitat loss.
