= Anthocleista liebrechtsiana =

Conservation status
- Least Concern (IUCN 3.1)

Scientific classification
- Kingdom: Plantae
- Clade: Tracheophytes
- Clade: Angiosperms
- Clade: Eudicots
- Clade: Asterids
- Order: Gentianales
- Family: Gentianaceae
- Genus: Anthocleista
- Species: A. liebrechtsiana

Binomial name
- Anthocleista liebrechtsiana De Wild. & T.Durand

Synonyms
- Anthocleista baertsiana De Wild. & T.Durand; Anthocleista gossweileri Exell

Species of flowering plant

Anthocleista liebrechtsiana is a species of plant in the Gentianaceae family. It is a small tree that is found from West Tropical Africa to the Caprivi Strip.

== Description ==
Anthocleista liebrechtsiana is a small tree that grows between 0.5 meters (1.6 feet) to 12 m (39.4 ft) tall. The spineless tree trunk is between 10 cm (4 inches) to 30 cm (11.9 inches) in diameter.

== Distribution ==
Anthocleista liebrechtsiana has been found from Angola, Benin, Cameroon, Central African Republic, Republic of the Congo, The Democratic Republic of the Congo, Gabon, Ghana, Namibia, Nigeria, Togo, and Zambia.
