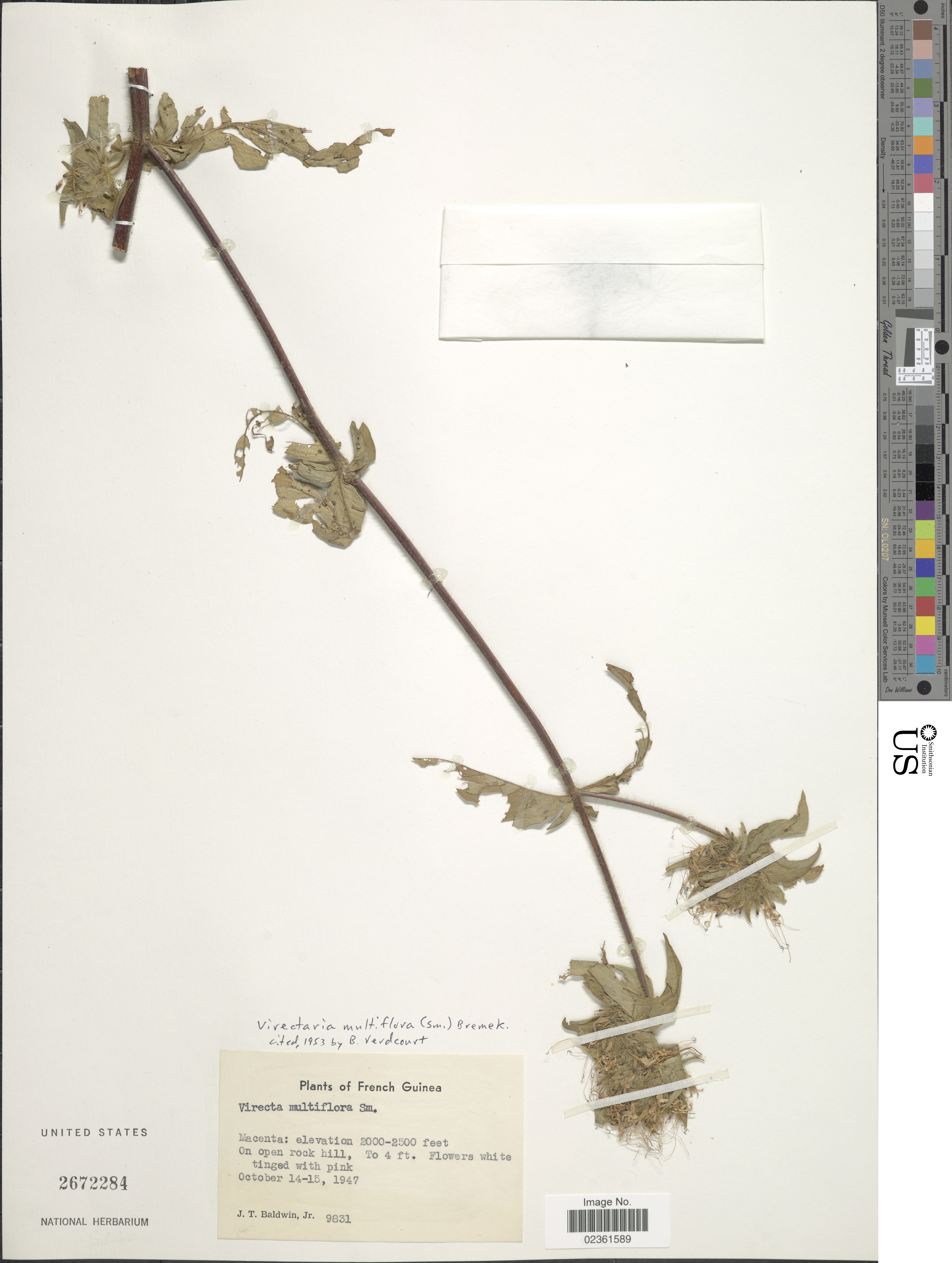
- Virectaria multiflora, preserved specimen

Scientific classification
- Kingdom: Plantae
- Clade: Tracheophytes
- Clade: Angiosperms
- Clade: Eudicots
- Clade: Asterids
- Order: Gentianales
- Family: Rubiaceae
- Subfamily: Ixoroideae
- Tribe: Sabiceeae
- Genus: Virectaria; Bremek.

Synonyms
- Phyteumoides Smeathman ex DC.; Virecta Afzel. ex Sm.

= Virectaria =

Genus of flowering plants

Virectaria is a genus of flowering plants in the family Rubiaceae. The genus, known as Virecta until 1952, consists exclusively of tropical African species. It is a Guineo-Congolian genus, having its highest diversity in Lower Guinea but it also occurs in the Zambezian Region. Verdcourt provided a revision in which he defined five species but three more were added later. In 2001, a detailed morphological and anatomical study of the genus was conducted and a taxonomic survey and a key to the species was provided.

== Description ==
All species are herbaceous or semi-woody and possess a fruit dehiscence type that is unique for the family; the splitting into one persistent and one deciduous valve allows recognizing the genus at first glance. In habit, Virectaria strongly resembles African Hedyotideae such as Otomeria and Parapentas but it lacks some diagnostic features of that tribe, viz. raphides, articulate hairs, heterostylous flowers and exotestal cells with only slight thickenings.

== Cultivation and use ==
Virectaria major is frequently used in traditional medicine. It is utilized to heal all kinds of disorders, varying from eye diseases to pneumonia. Most collectors report that decocted leaves are for healing wounds, which is reflected in the Mahi vernacular name "Kalyabirondo", signifying "that which eats wounds".

== Species ==
- Virectaria angustifolia (Hiern) Bremek.
- Virectaria belingana N.Hallé
- Virectaria herbacoursi N.Hallé
- Virectaria major (K.Schum.) Verdc.
- Virectaria multiflora (Sm.) Bremek.
- Virectaria procumbens (Sm.) Bremek.
- Virectaria salicoides (C.H.Wright) Bremek.
- Virectaria tenella J.B..Hall
