= Anthocleista vogelii =

Scientific classification
- Kingdom: Plantae
- Clade: Embryophytes
- Clade: Tracheophytes
- Clade: Angiosperms
- Clade: Eudicots
- Clade: Asterids
- Order: Gentianales
- Family: Gentianaceae
- Genus: Anthocleista
- Species: A. vogelii

Binomial name
- Anthocleista vogelii Planch. 1848

Synonyms
- Synonymy: Anthocleista auriculata de Wild., Ann. Mus. Congo, Ser. V. 3: 250 (1910); Anthocleista bequaerti de Wild., Rev. Zool. Afr. 10: Suppl. Bot. 8 (1922); Anthocleista buchneri Gilg, Bot. Jahrb. 17: 576 (1893); Anthocleista kalbreyeri Baker, Kew Bull. 99 (1895); Anthocleista lanceolata Gilg, Engl. Jahrb. 28: 125 (1899); Anthocleista macrantha Gilg, Bot. Jahrb. 17: 578 (1893); Anthocleista talbotii Wernham, Cat. Talbofs Nigerian Pl. 68 (1913); Anthocleista zenkeri Gilg, Engl. Jahrb. 28: 124 (1899)

Species of flowering plant

Anthocleista vogelii, commonly called Murderer's Mat (from Ashanti, significance unclear) or Cabbage Tree in several countries in Africa, is a rainforest tree in the family Gentianaceae.

== Description ==
Anthocleista vogelii reaches a height up to 80 ft (24 m) in height with leaves in opposite pairs up to 14 in (360 mm) long and 5 in (130 mm) in width in adult trees. Juvenile trees are noteworthy in bearing enormous leaves up to 7.5 ft (2.3 m) in length by about 18 in (460 mm) wide with wavey edges, in opposite pairs, with nodes spaced about 4 in (100 mm) apart.
