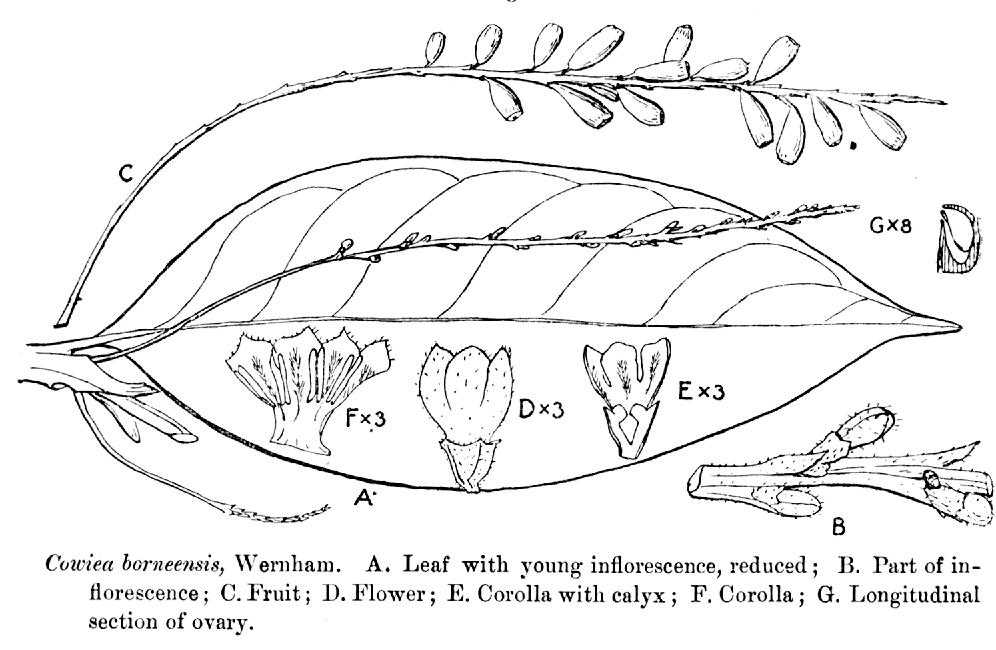
- (From Wernham, 1914)

Scientific classification
- Kingdom: Plantae
- Clade: Tracheophytes
- Clade: Angiosperms
- Clade: Eudicots
- Clade: Asterids
- Order: Gentianales
- Family: Rubiaceae
- Genus: Cowiea
- Species: C. borneensis

Binomial name
- Cowiea borneensis Wernham

= Cowiea borneensis =

Species of plant

Cowiea borneensis is a plant in the Rubiaceae family, native to north east Borneo.

== Description ==
It is a climbing shrub, having very long slender, spiked inflorescences with very small pentamerous flowers with short thick club-shaped (clavate) styles. The leathery elliptic leaves (16 cm by 5 cm) are on stems (5–8 mm). The scarcely joined stipules are 1.3 cm long and about 5 mm at the base. The calyx is 1 mm long. The corolla is sparsely hairy outside, but inside, the throat is densely bearded, but otherwise without hairs. The style together with the stigma is about 1.5 mm long. The berries are about 8 mm long by 4 mm in diameter.

== Habitat ==
Wernham reports the specimen he was describing as having been found in Tenom beside a railway track in a marshy section of the forest at an altitude of 700 feet (210 m).

== Taxonomy ==
It was first described in 1914 by Herbert Fuller Wernham, and is the type species of the genus, (named thus to honour William Clark Cowie, a chairman of the North Borneo Company), with the species epithet, borneensis, describing the plant as coming from Borneo.

An isotype, NY00131190, collected by A.D.E. Elmer in Sabah is held at the William and Lynda Steere Herbarium.
