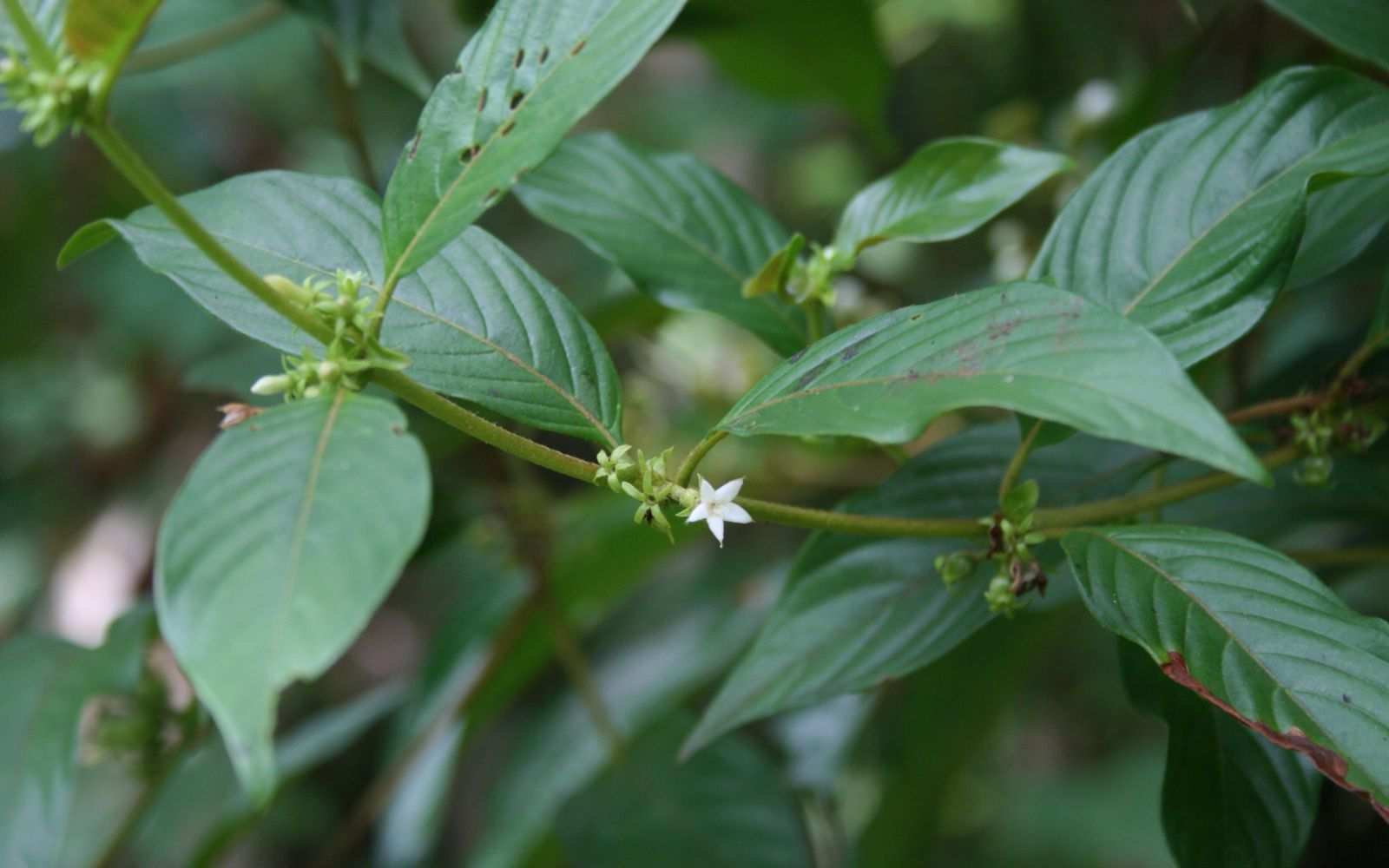
- Sabicea panamensis

Scientific classification
- Kingdom: Plantae
- Clade: Tracheophytes
- Clade: Angiosperms
- Clade: Eudicots
- Clade: Asterids
- Order: Gentianales
- Family: Rubiaceae
- Subfamily: Ixoroideae
- Tribe: Sabiceeae; Bremek.

Type genus
- Sabicea Aubl.

Synonyms
- Virectarieae Verdc.

= Sabiceeae =

Tribe of plants

Sabiceeae is a tribe of flowering plants in the family Rubiaceae and contains about 164 species in 7 genera. Its representatives are found in tropical Africa, Madagascar, Sri Lanka, and from Mexico to tropical America. The genus Sabicea is one of the rare genera in Rubiaceae that occurs both in tropical Africa and tropical America.

== Genera ==
Currently accepted names

- Hekistocarpa Hook.f. (1 sp)
- Pentaloncha Hook.f. (2 sp)
- Sabicea Aubl. (149 sp)
- Stipularia P.Beauv. (2 sp)
- Tamridaea Thulin & B.Bremer (1 sp)
- Temnopteryx Hook.f. (1 sp)
- Virectaria Bremek. (8 sp)

Synonyms

- Ecpoma K.Schum. = Sabicea
- Paiva Vell. = Sabicea
- Phyteumoides Smeathman ex DC. = Virectaria
- Pseudosabicea N.Hallé = Sabicea
- Schizostigma Arn. ex Meisn. = Sabicea
- Schwenkfelda Schreb. = Sabicea
- Virecta Afzel. ex Sm. = Virectaria
