= Anthocleista microphylla =

Conservation status
- Vulnerable (IUCN 3.1)

Scientific classification
- Kingdom: Plantae
- Clade: Embryophytes
- Clade: Tracheophytes
- Clade: Angiosperms
- Clade: Eudicots
- Clade: Asterids
- Order: Gentianales
- Family: Gentianaceae
- Genus: Anthocleista
- Species: A. microphylla

Binomial name
- Anthocleista microphylla Wernham

Species of flowering plant

Anthocleista microphylla is a species of plant in the family Gentianaceae. It is found in Cameroon, Equatorial Guinea, Ghana, Nigeria, and São Tomé and Príncipe. Its natural habitat is subtropical or tropical moist lowland forests. It is threatened by habitat loss.
