= Anthocleista madagascariensis =

Conservation status
- Least Concern (IUCN 3.1)

Scientific classification
- Kingdom: Plantae
- Clade: Embryophytes
- Clade: Tracheophytes
- Clade: Angiosperms
- Clade: Eudicots
- Clade: Asterids
- Order: Gentianales
- Family: Gentianaceae
- Genus: Anthocleista
- Species: A. madagascariensis

Binomial name
- Anthocleista madagascariensis Baker.

Synonyms
- Anthocleista hildebrandtii Gilg; Anthocleista rhizophoroides Baker

Species of flowering plant

Anthocleista madagascariensis is a species of plant in the Gentianaceae family. It is a tree that is widespread throughout the evergreen forests of Madagascar.

== Description ==
Anthocleista madagascariensis is a medium sized tree that grows up to 8 meters (26 ft) tall. It grows in humid to semi-humid evergreen forests from 0 to 1,700 meters (5,600 ft) from sea level.

== Taxonomy ==
Anthocleista madagascariensis was first named and described by John Gilbert Baker in 1882.
