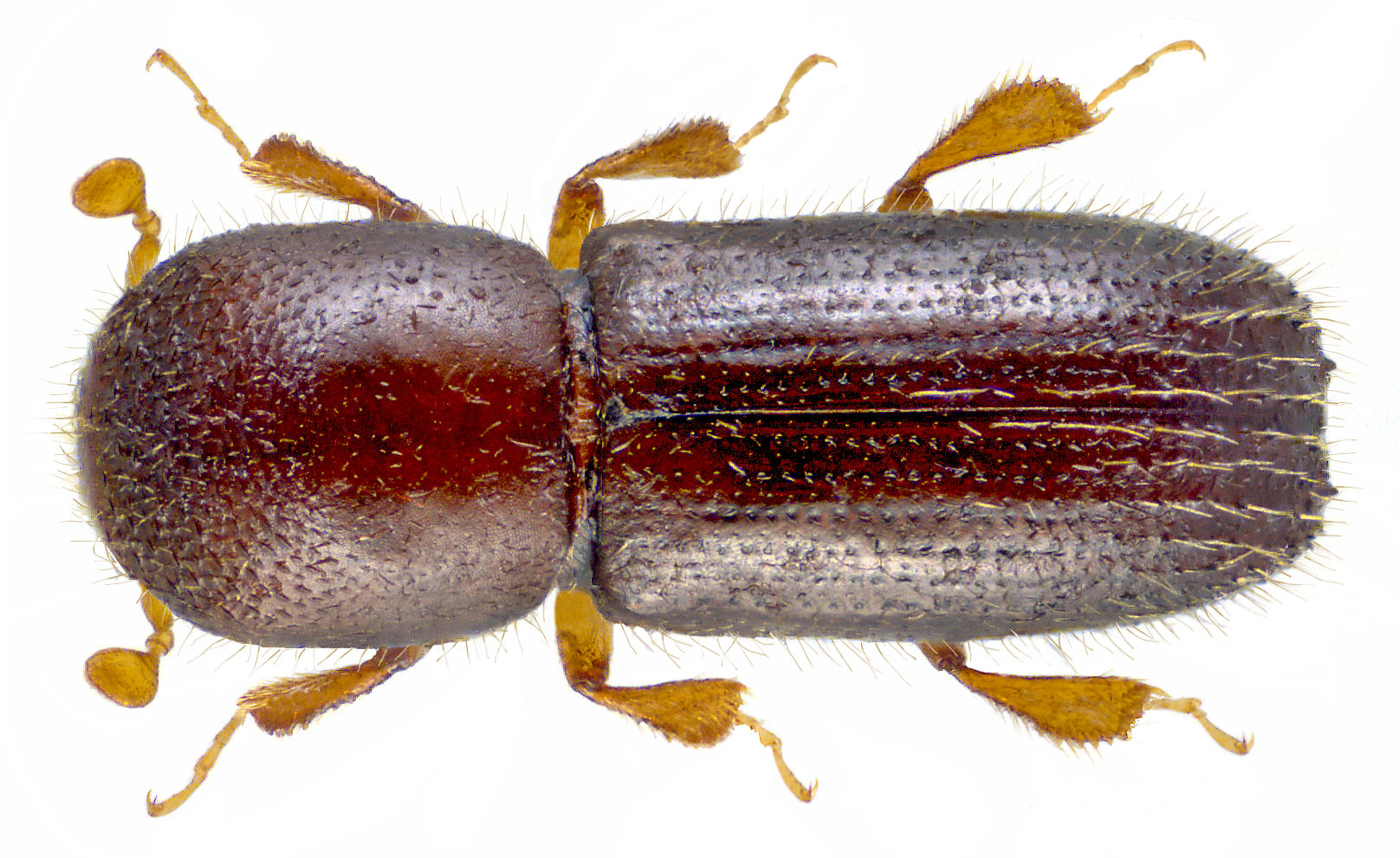
- Xyleborinus saxesenii

Scientific classification
- Kingdom: Animalia
- Phylum: Arthropoda
- Clade: Pancrustacea
- Class: Insecta
- Order: Coleoptera
- Suborder: Polyphaga
- Infraorder: Cucujiformia
- Superfamily: Curculionoidea
- Family: Curculionidae
- Subfamily: Scolytinae
- Tribe: Xyleborini
- Genus: Xyleborinus; Reitter, 1913

= Xyleborinus =

Genus of beetles

Xyleborinus is a genus of typical bark beetles in the family Curculionidae. There are more than 80 described species in Xyleborinus.

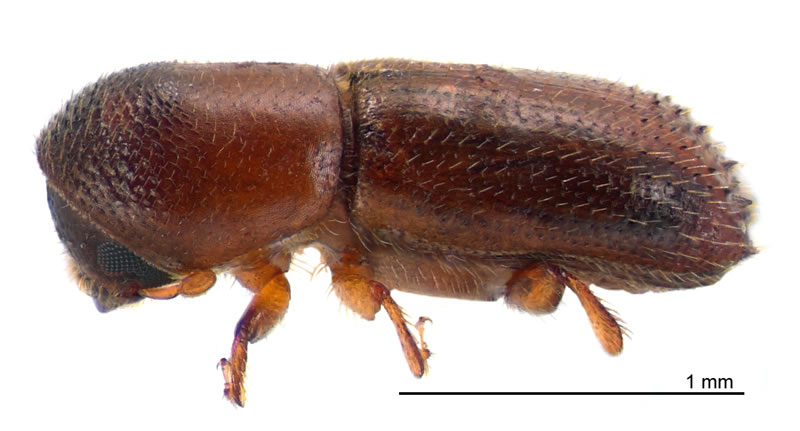
Xyleborinus saxesenii

== Species ==
These 89 species belong to the genus Xyleborinus:

- Xyleborinus aduncus Wood & Bright, 1992
- Xyleborinus aemulus Wood & Bright, 1992
- Xyleborinus alienus Wood & Bright, 1992
- Xyleborinus alni Niijima, 1909
- Xyleborinus andrewesi Wood & Bright, 1992
- Xyleborinus angustior Hulcr, Dole, Beaver & Cognato, 2007
- Xyleborinus ankius Wood & Bright, 1992
- Xyleborinus armatus Wood & Bright, 1992
- Xyleborinus artelineatus Wood & Bright, 1992
- Xyleborinus artestriatus Wood & Bright, 1992
- Xyleborinus aspericauda (Eggers, 1941)
- Xyleborinus attenuatus Wood & Bright, 1992
- Xyleborinus beaveri Beaver & Browne (Browne in), 1978
- Xyleborinus bicornatulus Wood & Bright, 1992
- Xyleborinus buscki Bright, 1981c
- Xyleborinus celatus Wood, 1974a
- Xyleborinus cocoensis Kirkendall & Jordal, 2006
- Xyleborinus collarti Wood & Bright, 1992
- Xyleborinus cuneidentis Wood & Bright, 1992
- Xyleborinus cuneolosus Wood & Bright, 1992
- Xyleborinus cupulatus Wood & Bright, 1992
- Xyleborinus dentellus Wood & Bright, 1992
- Xyleborinus diapiformis Wood & Bright, 1992
- Xyleborinus dirus Wood, 1974a
- Xyleborinus diversus Wood & Bright, 1992
- Xyleborinus excavatus Wood & Bright, 1992
- Xyleborinus exiguus Walker
- Xyleborinus forcipatus Wood & Bright, 1992
- Xyleborinus forficuloides Wood & Bright, 1992
- Xyleborinus forficulus Wood & Bright, 1992
- Xyleborinus gracilicornis Wood & Bright, 1992
- Xyleborinus gracilipennis Wood & Bright, 1992
- Xyleborinus gracilis Wood & Bright, 1992
- Xyleborinus heveae Wood & Bright, 1992
- Xyleborinus horridulus Bright & Skidmore, 1997
- Xyleborinus insulosus Bright & Torres, 2006
- Xyleborinus intersetosus Wood & Bright, 1992
- Xyleborinus librocedri Swaine & J.M., 1934
- Xyleborinus linearicollis Wood & Bright, 1992
- Xyleborinus longulus Bright, 1985c
- Xyleborinus longus Wood & Bright, 1992
- Xyleborinus marcidus Wood & Bright, 1992
- Xyleborinus micrographus Wood & Bright, 1992
- Xyleborinus mimosae Wood & Bright, 1992
- Xyleborinus mitosomiformis Wood & Bright, 1992
- Xyleborinus mitosomipennis Wood & Bright, 1992
- Xyleborinus namibiae Wood & Bright, 1992
- Xyleborinus octiesdentatus (Murayama, 1931: 46)
- Xyleborinus octospinosus Wood & Bright, 1992
- Xyleborinus opimulus Wood & Bright, 1992
- Xyleborinus percuneolus Wood & Bright, 1992
- Xyleborinus perexiguus Wood & Bright, 1992
- Xyleborinus perminutissimus Wood & Bright, 1992
- Xyleborinus perpusillus Wood & Bright, 1992
- Xyleborinus pilosellus Wood & Bright, 1992
- Xyleborinus polyalthiae Wood & Bright, 1992
- Xyleborinus pometianus Wood & Bright, 1992
- Xyleborinus protinus Wood & Bright, 1992
- Xyleborinus pseudopityogenes Wood & Bright, 1992
- Xyleborinus quadrispinis Wood & Bright, 1992
- Xyleborinus quadrispinosus Wood & Bright, 1992
- Xyleborinus reconditus Wood & Bright, 1992
- Xyleborinus saginatus Wood, 2007
- Xyleborinus saxesenii (Ratzeburg, 1837) (fruit-tree pinhole borer)
- Xyleborinus schaufussi Wood & Bright, 1992
- Xyleborinus schoenherri Wood & Bright, 1992
- Xyleborinus sclerocaryae Wood & Bright, 1992
- Xyleborinus sculptilis Wood & Bright, 1992
- Xyleborinus sentosus Wood & Bright, 1992
- Xyleborinus sharpae Wood & Bright, 1992
- Xyleborinus signatipennis Wood & Bright, 1992
- Xyleborinus similans Wood & Bright, 1992
- Xyleborinus speciosus Wood & Bright, 1992
- Xyleborinus spiculatulus Wood & Bright, 1992
- Xyleborinus spiculatus Wood & Bright, 1992
- Xyleborinus spinifer Wood & Bright, 1992
- Xyleborinus spiniger Wood & Bright, 1992
- Xyleborinus spinipennis Wood & Bright, 1992
- Xyleborinus spinipes Wood & Bright, 1992
- Xyleborinus spiniposticus Wood, 1992a
- Xyleborinus spinosus Wood & Bright, 1992
- Xyleborinus subgranulatus Eggers, 1930
- Xyleborinus subsulcatus Wood & Bright, 1992
- Xyleborinus syzygii Wood & Bright, 1992
- Xyleborinus tribuloides Wood, 1977b
- Xyleborinus tribulosus Wood, 1974a
- Xyleborinus truncatipennis Wood & Bright, 1992
- Xyleborinus tsugae Swaine & J.M., 1934
- Xyleborinus undatus Wood & Bright, 1992
