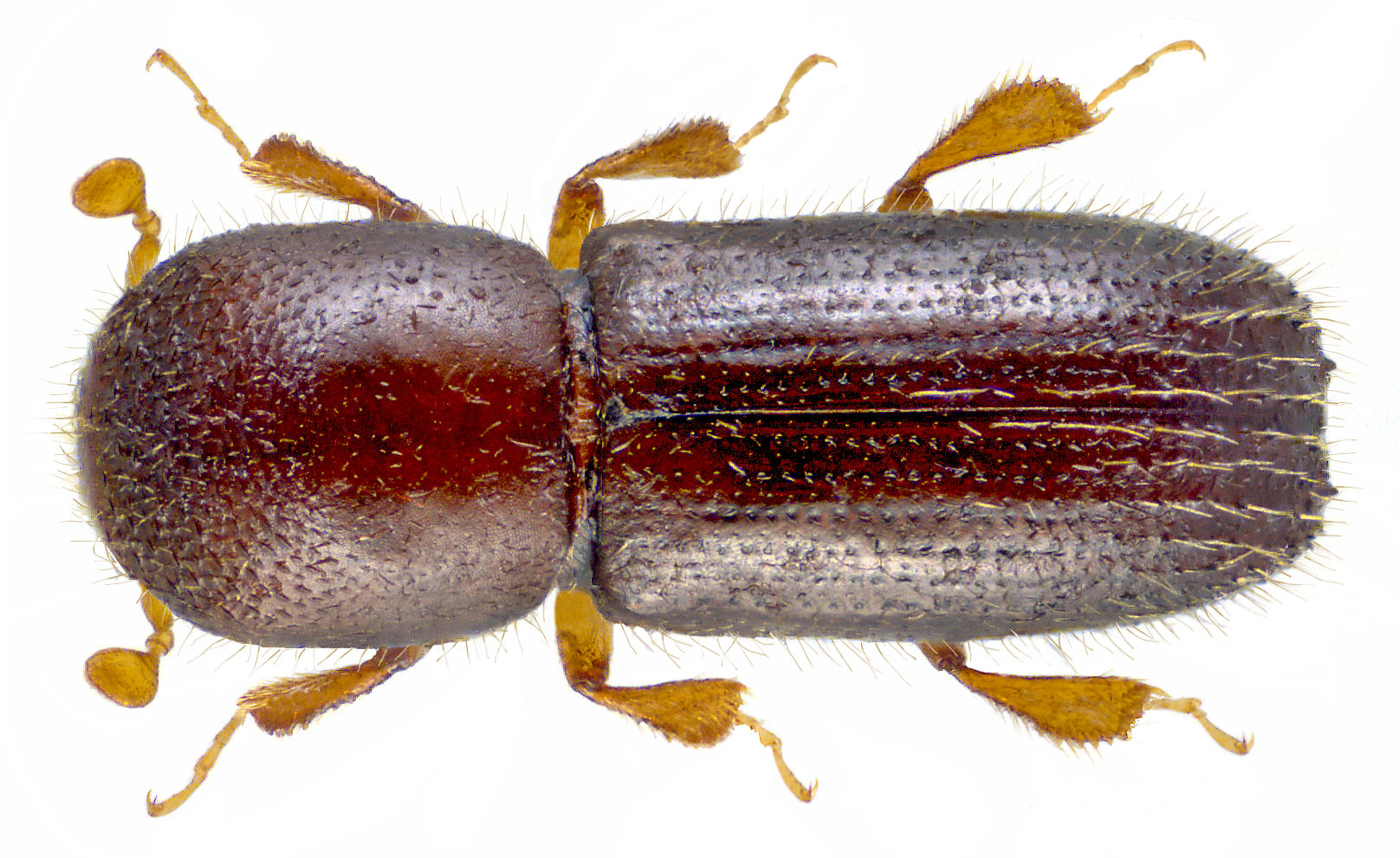

Scientific classification
- Kingdom: Animalia
- Phylum: Arthropoda
- Clade: Pancrustacea
- Class: Insecta
- Order: Coleoptera
- Suborder: Polyphaga
- Infraorder: Cucujiformia
- Superfamily: Curculionoidea
- Family: Curculionidae
- Genus: Xyleborinus
- Species: X. saxesenii

Binomial name
- Xyleborinus saxesenii (Ratzeburg, 1837)

= Xyleborinus saxesenii =

Species of beetle

Xyleborinus saxesenii, commonly known as the fruit-tree pinhole borer, is a species of ambrosia beetle in the family Curculionidae. It is native to the Palaearctic region but has been introduced in many locations, including North America. X. saxesenii typically live in freshly dead wood, but it has also been reported to attack live trees. Such attacks on live trees may lead to economic damage.

Like other ambrosia beetles, Xyleborinus saxesenii has a symbiotic relationship with ambrosia fungi, particularly the Raffaelea sulfurea species. X. saxesenii inoculate the wood in which they inhabit with the fungus and farm it to utilize it as a food resource. Although there are benefits to farming fungi, there are also costs in the form of microbes and pathogens that infiltrate these fungal farms.

Xyleborinus saxesenii are a haplodiploid species that have a heavily biased sex ratio in favor of females. Males do not contribute much to the productivity of the nests, and typically spend a large amount of their time searching for mates. Unlike males, females contribute to gallery productivity and may even delay sexual dispersal to help with tasks such as brood care. Both adult females and larvae contribute to tasks within the gallery, but there is often an age-based division of labor in these tasks.

== Geographic range and habitat ==
X. saxesenii are typically found in temperate climate zones across the world. However, there are also records of the species in tropical climate zones. X. saxesenii first originated in the Palaearctic region, but it has been introduced across the world, including North America. It is believed that the species was spread geographically through commercial transfers. Because the species is cryptic, it is often left unnoticed during the transfer of wood products.

The introduction of X. saxesenii in the United States of America may have been due to transfer of wood which contained the species. Based on the spread of the X. Saxesenii in the United States, which is more dense on the coasts, it appears that the species was brought to the East and West coasts through separate transfers. The species has also been found in the state of Hawaii.

Xyleborinus saxesenii has also been found in Uruguay on trees that are weakened or dead. The Xyleborinus found in Uruguay are different from other American genera due to their cephalad conical scutellum and dense setae.

Xyleborinus saxesenii primarily live in the dead wood of several different types of trees. This is typical of other ambrosia beetles. The beetle has also been found to attack live trees, such as the chestnut tree. The state of degradation of the dead wood may impact the humidity of the habitat, which can affect the ambrosia fungus with which the X. saxesenii has a symbiotic relationship. In an experimental study varying the humidity of their habitat, it was found that environments that are excessively dry (which would occur if a tree has been dead for a very long time) or humid (which would occur if a tree has just died) lead to reduced offspring fitness. Both deviations from optimal humidity result in reduced ambrosia fungi success, which most likely caused a reduction of food resources that led to the lowered offspring fitness.

== Food resources ==
Xyleborinus saxesenii uses ambrosia fungi as a food resource. Like other species of ambrosia beetles, X. saxesenii has a mutualistic relationship with ambrosia fungus species, in particular the Raffaela sulfurea species. The beetles farm this fungal species and feeds off of it. Unlike other ambrosia beetles, X. saxesenii has also been noted to feed off of the wood of the trees in which they inhabit. This has led to the categorization of the species as xylomycetophagous, meaning that they feed on both wood and fungi.

== Life history ==
Xyleborinus saxesenii females establish galleries in a tree and introduce fungi into the walls of their gallery. After the fungal garden is created and sufficient, which is typically 4–51 days after the gallery was established, the females will then lay 5-15 eggs. Eggs take approximately five days to develop. During this development time, the eggs are regularly moved and groomed.

After the eggs hatch, larvae experience three instar stages. The first instar stage lasts approximately 4 days, while the second and third instar stages last from 4 to 17 days. Larvae use the fungal garden in the wood as a food resource. This helps to grow the size of the tunnels, giving the fungi more room to grow, thus reducing competition within the colony for food resources. Both the larvae and adult female offspring contribute to productivity of the gallery, but there is a division of labor within these tasks. For example, larvae are the main contributors to the enlargement of the gallery, while adult females are the main contributors to caring for the fungal gardens. Both age groups assist in the grooming of others.

After the pupa stage, the mature female adults may either remain in the gallery to help with productivity or disperse from the gallery to establish their own.

== Enemies ==
The mutualistic relationship of X. saxesenii with its respective fungal species leads to the potential for the presence of several enemies. X. saxesenii primarily share a mutualistic relationship with the R. sulfurea fungal species by farming the fungus within their galleries. However, microbes can invade their gardens. These microbes can pose several threats to the beetles. These microbes can be entomopathogenic fungi, which are fungi that can kill insects. These microbes may also compete with the fungal garden and lead to reduced food resources for the beetles. One example is Aspergillus, which is a pathogenic fungal spore that commonly competes with R. sulfurea and is often found in X. saxesenii experiencing disease.

The presence of these enemies leads to several impacts on the behavior of X. saxesenii. An experimental study has shown that X. saxesenii are capable of detecting the presence of Aspergillus, and females as a result increase hygienic behaviors such as social grooming to reduce its effects. Males were not observed to change their behaviors in the presence of the Aspergillus fungus. In the presence of Beauveria bassiana, an entomopathogen, adult females and larvae exhibit different behavioral responses. Larvae avoid Beauveria bassiana, while adult females are attracted to it. It is possible that the adult females go to the Beauveria bassiana in an attempt to prevent it from spreading widely in the nest.

== Mating ==
=== Delayed sexual dispersal of females ===
Xyleborinus saxesenii typically exhibit inbreeding, as it is common for siblings to mate with each other. This inbreeding leads to increased levels of genetic relatedness within broods. As a result, high sociality may be of benefit to tribes, and studies have been conducted to investigate this behavior. Adult female X. saxesenii exhibit sexual dispersal during the summer and fall seasons. After they mate with their male siblings, the adult females leave their natal gallery to establish their own galleries. Research has shown that adult females may delay such sexual dispersal. Some females may never sexually disperse at all.

There are several possible reasons for this delayed sexual dispersal. When the females stay in their natal galleries, it was found that the productivity of the gallery increases. These findings suggest that the adult females may delay their dispersal in order to help the success of their natal colonies. The females stay to help with tasks such as brood care. These characteristics classify X. saxesenii as a species that exhibits cooperative breeding, which is a system in which individuals help care for offspring that are not their own. Additionally, there may be costs associated with leaving the natal gallery, such as a low success rate in creating a new nest. Adult females may then benefit from staying in the nest where they can contribute to the productivity of the gallery and/or reproduce within their original gallery.

Dispersal is further supported in a separate study in which mature females were shown to help take care of fungi and the brood for at least 17 days. Despite dispersal starting, females still accumulate in the galleries. Benefits of delayed dispersal include helping others raise young and producing their own offspring. It was observed in the laboratory and field that daughter beetles did not reproduce prior to dispersal.

=== Role of males ===
Xyleborinus saxesenii is a species with a sex ratio that is strongly female biased. They are a haplodiploid species, in which males are haploid and females are diploid. Fertilized eggs go on to become females while unfertilized eggs go on to become males. The species also exhibits inbreeding and local mate competition between males. These characteristics are typical for species that have a sex ratio that favors females. A study investigating X. saxesenii sex ratios found that approximately a third of mothers do not have male offspring and when male offspring are produced, the ideal number is only 1 to 2 per brood. It may be beneficial to have a reduced number of males to lower local mate competition between them.

Males do not contribute much effort to the maintenance of the natal gallery. Aside from time spent feeding, males spend a large majority of the time walking around the gallery to find females to mate with. Males attempt to mate with both mature and immature females, but they are typically only successful in mating with immature females. Despite the relatively small number of males present in each gallery, they are capable of finding and fertilizing the majority of females in the gallery. Males may also disperse, but they typically do not do so until all of the females in the gallery are fully developed.

== Physiology ==
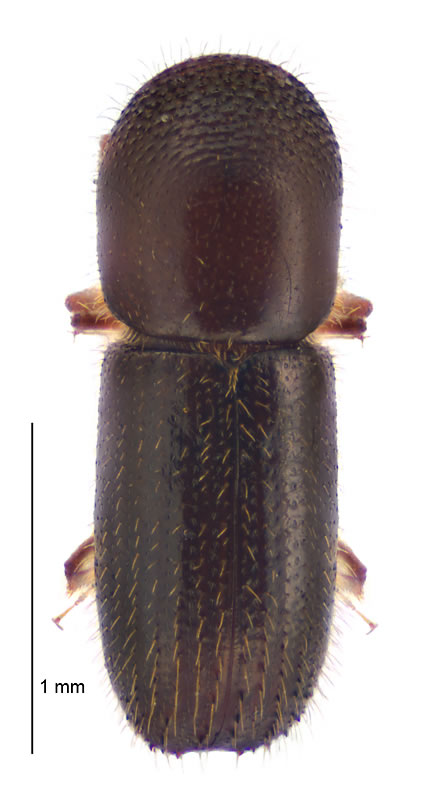
Top view with scale of adult Xyleborinus saxesenii

=== Eggs ===
The eggs have an oval shape and are typically shiny and white-yellow in color. They are 0.52–0.55 mm (0.020–0.022 in) in length and 0.24–0.26 mm (0.0094–0.0102 in) in width.

=== Larvae ===
The larvae do not have legs and are a white to yellow color. They have a head capsule that is a golden-white color. The larvae go through three instar stages.

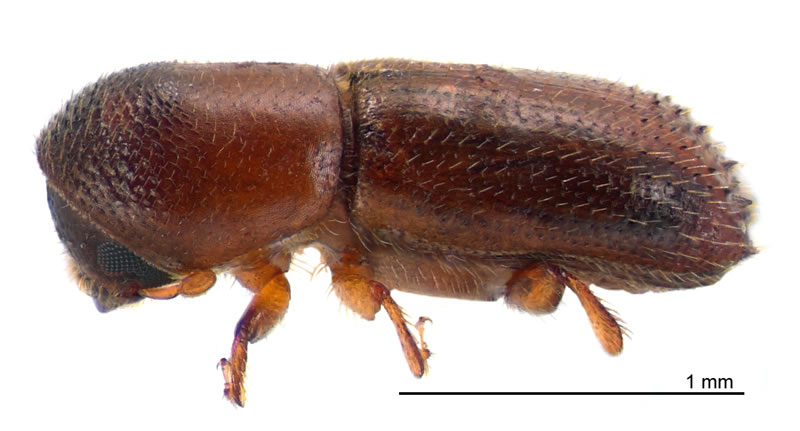
Side view of adult Xyleborinus saxesenii

=== Pupae ===
The pupae are white in color. The pupae have a maximum length of 2 mm (0.079 in) and their pronota are 0.7 mm (0.028 in) in width. There is sexual dimorphism in the size of male and female pupae.

=== Adult ===
Adult females have a length of 2.0–2.4 mm (0.079–0.094 in). Their bodies have a cylindrical, elongated shape and are usually brown in color. Xyleborinus saxesenii is visually similar to other Xyleborinus and Xyleborus species. Species from the Xyleborinus genus differ from those in other genera by their scutellum. In the Xyleborinus genus, the scutellum has a conical shape. X. saxesenii differs from other similar Xyleborinus species because it has smaller and less pointed spines at the end of its elytra. X. saxesenii also has a rounded as opposed to tapered abdomen.

The adults also exhibit sexual dimorphism. The females are larger than males. Males also do not have wings like the females and have smaller eyes than the females.

== Mutualism ==
Like other species of ambrosia beetles, X. saxesenii has a mutualistic relationship with ambrosia fungus species. This beetle is associated with several fungal species, but its interactions are primarily known to be with the Raffaelea sulfurea species. X. saxesenii, like other ambrosia beetles, create tunnels in the trees of which they inhabit. After creating these tunnels, the beetles introduce the fungal species with which they have relationship into the wood. This relationship benefits both the beetle and the fungus. The presence of the fungus within the habitat provides the beetle with a food resource. The fungus also benefits by being widely transmitted. Females of X. saxesenii can serve as a vector to carry and transmit the spores of fungi during dispersal. However, fungi such as Ceratocystis species are parasitic for the host tree.

== Damage, benefit and impact ==
=== Environmental damage ===
Ambrosia beetles that create nests in live trees act as pests in nurseries. These beetles create holes in trees and introduce fungi that may have pathogens that can lead to disease of the trees. Because ambrosia beetles are cryptic, they are often left unnoticed in the transfer of wood products.

=== Environmental benefit ===
It has been shown that X. saxesenii attacked freshly sawn timber and logs. Their attack might help to kill the live insects within the timber which should not be exported.

=== Economic impact ===
Some ambrosia beetle species cause economic damage as a result of tree damage. These beetles are generally difficult to control with pesticides. In a Tennessee based study investigating ambrosia beetle control methods, X. saxesenii were found to attack live chestnut trees.

== Control ==
=== Detection and inspection ===
Xyleborinus saxesenii was the most common species of ambrosia beetles caught via ethanol-baited traps and the timing of their most frequent trapping aligned with when trees were most frequently attacked. Control methods require an understanding of the timing of the emergence of the beetles. In Samsun and Ordu provinces in Turkey, X. saxesenii were found in traps from the last week of March to last week of September with the highest count of trapped beetles occurring in July and August. These observations showed that adults emerged when temperatures were 18-20 °C.

=== Sanitation ===
Since X. saxesenii mostly attacks dying trees, it is essential to improve the health of the trees and prevent the beetle from spreading when detected. The infected branches should be cut out and burned along with a sealing on the wound to avoid secondary infection.
