= Anthocleista laxiflora =

Conservation status
- Vulnerable (IUCN 3.1)

Scientific classification
- Kingdom: Plantae
- Clade: Embryophytes
- Clade: Tracheophytes
- Clade: Spermatophytes
- Clade: Angiosperms
- Clade: Eudicots
- Clade: Asterids
- Order: Gentianales
- Family: Gentianaceae
- Genus: Anthocleista
- Species: A. laxiflora

Binomial name
- Anthocleista laxiflora Baker

Species of flowering plant

Anthocleista laxiflora is a species of plant in the family Gentianaceae. It is a vulnerable climbing plant that is endemic to Central Africa.

== Description ==
Anthocleista laxiflora is a climbing shrub or liana growing to 10 m (33 ft) tall. The twigs are lenticellate and have prominent internodes. The overlapping leaves are oblong with a pointed tip, each measuring 12–20 cm (4.7–7.9 in) by 5–7 cm (2.0–2.8 in). The upper surface of the leaf is dark green, with a paler underside. The inflorescence measures 15–20 cm (5.9–7.9 in) long with three branches. The fruit is a smooth, round berry that measures approximately 2 cm (0.79 in) long.

== Taxonomy ==
Anthocleista laxiflora was first named and described in 1895 by John Gilbert Baker.

== Distribution and habitat ==
Anthocleista laxiflora is native to Equatorial Guinea, Gabon, and the Republic of the Congo, though it may also be present in Cameroon. It grows in mature riverine forests at 14–770 m (46–2,526 ft) above sea level.

== Conservation status ==
Anthocleista laxiflora is listed as vulnerable by the International Union for the Conservation of Nature under criteria B2ab(ii,iii,iv,v), based on the small number of locations in which it is present, observed decline in habitat, and estimated future population decline. Threats to this species include logging and habitat destruction, and a planned hydro-electric dam in Gabon is expected to negatively impact three of the six known populations. A. laxiflora is known to occur in several protected areas, including Moukalaba-Doudou National Park in Gabon and the Estuario del Muni Natural Reserve in Equatorial Guinea. It is conserved ex situ in Gabon, however, survival rates within this conservation program have been poor.
