= Temnopteryx sericea =

Scientific classification
- Kingdom: Plantae
- Clade: Tracheophytes
- Clade: Angiosperms
- Clade: Eudicots
- Clade: Asterids
- Order: Gentianales
- Family: Rubiaceae
- Subfamily: Ixoroideae
- Tribe: Sabiceeae
- Genus: Temnopteryx; Hook.f.
- Species: T. sericea

Binomial name
- Temnopteryx sericea Hook.f.

Species of flowering plant

Temnopteryx is a monotypic genus of flowering plants in the family Rubiaceae. It was originally described by Joseph Dalton Hooker in 1873. It is found in Cameroon, Equatorial Guinee and Gabon. The sole species is Temnopteryx sericea.
