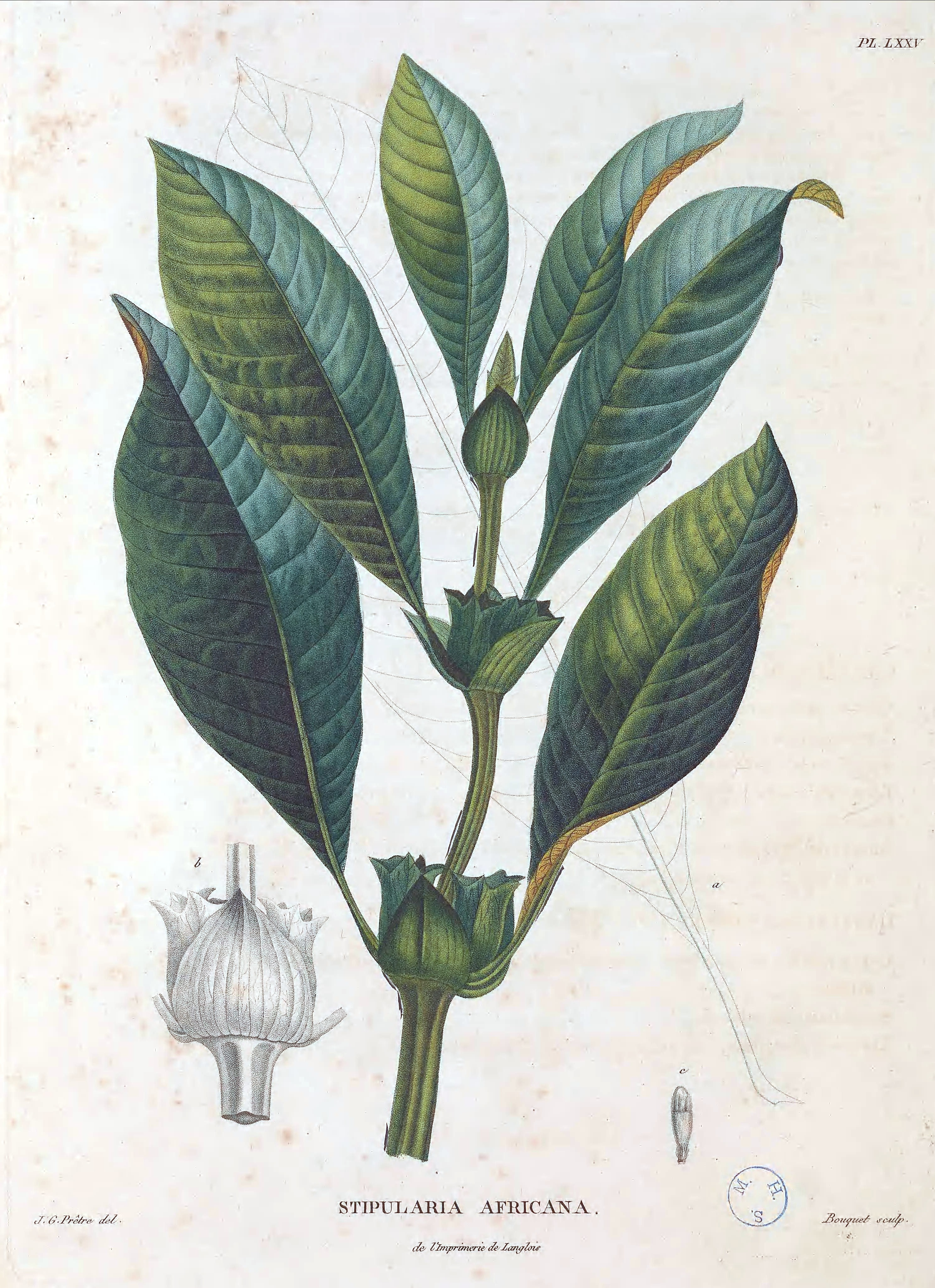
- Stipularia africana

Scientific classification
- Kingdom: Plantae
- Clade: Tracheophytes
- Clade: Angiosperms
- Clade: Eudicots
- Clade: Asterids
- Order: Gentianales
- Family: Rubiaceae
- Subfamily: Ixoroideae
- Tribe: Sabiceeae
- Genus: Stipularia; P.Beauv. (1807)

Species
- Stipularia africana P.Beauv.; Stipularia elliptica Schweinf. ex Hiern

= Stipularia =

Genus of plants

Stipularia is a genus of flowering plants in family Rubiaceae. It includes two species of shrubs of woody herbs native to western and central tropical Africa, Ranging from Sierra Leone to South Sudan, Zambia, and Angola.

- Stipularia africana P.Beauv. – western and central tropical Africa, from Sierra Leone to Central African Republic, Zambia, and Angola
- Stipularia elliptica Schweinf. ex Hiern – central tropical Africa, from Nigeria to South Sudan and Democratic Republic of the Congo.
