= Anthocleista nobilis =

Conservation status
- Least Concern (IUCN 3.1)

Scientific classification
- Kingdom: Plantae
- Clade: Embryophytes
- Clade: Tracheophytes
- Clade: Angiosperms
- Clade: Eudicots
- Clade: Asterids
- Order: Gentianales
- Family: Gentianaceae
- Genus: Anthocleista
- Species: A. nobilis

Binomial name
- Anthocleista nobilis G.Don

Species of flowering plant

Anthocleista nobilis, commonly known as cabbage tree, candelarum, and cabbage palm, is a species of plant in the Gentianaceae family. It is a tree that is found from West Tropical Africa to Angola.

== Distribution ==
Anthocleista nobilis has been recorded from Angola, Central African Republic, Republic of the Congo, Côte d'Ivoire, Equatorial Guinea, Ghana, Guinea, Liberia, Nigeria, Mali, Sao Tome and Principe, Senegal, and Sierra Leone.

== Description ==
Anthocleista nobilis is a medium-large tree that can grow between 4 and 30 meters (13 and 98 ft) tall. The trunk is normally between 14 and 90 centimeters (5.5 and 35.4 in) in diameter. The spiny, hollow branches support 40 cm (16 in) long by 12 cm (4.7 in) wide leaves. It typically grows in secondary jungles, roadsides and disturbed sites.

=== Medicinal uses ===
Anthocleista nobilis root bark is used by the Mbano people of Nigeria for treatment of Diabetes mellitus, malaria, gastrointestinal worms and jaundice.

In 2018, a study found that Anthocleista nobilis could be a potential source for anti-inflammatory and analgesic lead compounds.
