= Herbert Fuller Wernham =

British botanist (1879-1941)

Herbert Fuller Wernham FLS
- Born: 24 September 1879; Hatcham, London, England
- Died: 20 September 1941 (aged 61); Rochford, Essex, England
- Scientific career
- Fields: Botany
- Institutions: British Museum
- Author abbrev. (botany): Wernham

Herbert Fuller Wernham (24 September 1879 – 20 September 1941) was a British botanist, who from 1909 to 1929 worked at the British Museum, as an assistant in the botany department. From 1911 to 1921 he published extensively on tropical plants and many genera, retiring in 1921 due to ill health (alcoholism).

The standard author abbreviation Wernham is used to indicate this person as the author when citing a botanical name.

== Names published ==
He published 603 names, including

- Acrocephalus klossii Wernham, J. Nat. Hist. Soc. Siam iv. 142 (1921). (now a synonym of Platostoma cochinchinense (Lour.) A.J.Paton)
- Alibertia pedicellata Wernham, Bull. Misc. Inform. Kew 1914(2): 66 (1914) (now a synonym of Sphinctanthus polycarpus (H.Karst.) Hook.f.)
- Anthocleista microphylla Wernham, Cat. Pl. Oban 67 (1913).
- Cowiea borneensis Wernham, J. Linn. Soc., Bot. xlii. 97 (1914).
- Fagraea carstensensis Trans. Linn. Soc. London, Bot. 9(1): 111 (1916).

== Publications ==
(incomplete)

- Wernham, H.F. (1911). "The genus Canephora". Journal of Botany (London). 49: 77–82.
- Wernham, H.F. (1911). "A revision of the genus Hamelia". Journal of Botany (London). 49: 206–216.
- Wernham, H.F. (1912). "The systematic anatomy of the genus Canephora". Beihefte zum Botanischen Centralblatt. 28: 453–472.
- Wernham, H. F. (1914). "Enumeration of TA Sprague's South American Plants: Gamopetalae". Bulletin of Miscellaneous Information (Royal Botanic Gardens, Kew). 1914 (2): 63–69. doi:10.2307/4118579. JSTOR 4118579.
- Wernham, H.F. (1912). "A revision of the genus Bertiera". Journal of Botany. 50: 110–117.
- Wernham, H.F. (1912). "Floral Evolution: With Particular Reference to the Sympetalous Dicotyledons VII. Inferae: Part I. Rubiales". New Phytologist. 11 (7): 217–235. doi:10.1111/j.1469-8137.1912.tb05640.x. hdl:2027/uiug.30112067913662.
- Wernham, H.F. (1916). "New gamopetalae from South Cameroun". Journal of Botany. 54: 226–231.
- Wernham, H.F. (1914). "Cowiea". Journal of the Linnean Society. Botany. London. 42: 96–97.
- Wernham, H.F. (1914). "The Mussaendas of Madagascar". The Journal of Botany. 52: 64–72.
- Wernham, H.F. (1914). "New Rubiaceae from tropical America — IV". Botanical Journal of Botany, British and Foreign. 52: 225–227.
- Wernham, H.F (1916). Ridley, H.N (ed.). "Gamopetalae Rubiaceae in I. Report on the Botany of the Wollaston Expedition to Dutch New Guinea, 1912–13". Transactions of the Linnean Society. 9 (1): 66–79.
- Wernham, H.F. (1914). Monograph of the genus Sabicea. Vol. 1914.
- Wernham, H.F. (1918). "New Rubiaceae from the Belgian Congo". Botanical Journal of Botany, British and Foreign. 56: 308–314.

== Honours ==
He is honoured in the ganus & species names:

- Wernhamia S.Moore
- Psychotria wernhamiana S.Moore, J. Bot. 65: 269 (1927).
- Tricalysia wernhamiana (Hutch. & Dalziel) Keay, Bull. Jard. Bot. État Bruxelles 28: 291 (1958).
- Cremaspora wernhamiana Hutch. & Dalziel, Fl. W. Trop. Afr. [Hutchinson & Dalziel] ii. 85 (1931).
