= List of Cladonota species =

The following is a list of treehopper species within the genus Cladonota.

== Subgenus Falculifera ==
Species in this subgenus are characterized by a lack of intermediate process on the pronotum.

Species	Authority	Range	Length (Note: Unless otherwise noted, measured from the forehead to the tip of the elytra)	Description	Sexual dimorphism	Image
Cladonota apicalis	Stål, 1869	Mexico, Central America, Ecuador, Bolivia, Peru, Venezuela, Brazil	6 to 9 mm (0.24 to 0.35 in)	White stripe on the dorsal side of the posterior process. Two forms are known, C-shaped and ovoid.	Absent	
Cladonota benitezi	Arnaud, 2004	Mexico	12 mm (0.47 in) (male), 17 mm (0.67 in) (female)		Present	
Cladonota bolivari	Peláez, 1945	Mexico, Costa Rica, Panama	8.5 mm (0.33 in)		Male unknown	
Cladonota clavigera	Stål, 1864	Mexico to Costa Rica	7 mm (0.28 in)		Present	
Cladonota luctuosa	Peláez, 1945	Mexico	8 mm (0.31 in) (male), 10 mm (0.39 in) (female) (Note: Measured up to the base of the posterior process)		Present	
Cladonota rex	England et al., 2020	Costa Rica	6 mm (0.24 in)	Yellow-green saddle-shaped area between the posterior and anterior processes of the pronotum.	Male unknown	
Cladonota rothschildi	Flynn, 2018	Costa Rica, Panama	6 mm (0.24 in)		Female unknown	
Cladonota zeledoni	Peláez, 1967	Costa Rica	7 mm (0.28 in)		Present	

== Subgenus Cladonota ==
Unlike Falculifera, the type subgenus Cladonota possesses an intermediate process on the pronotum. It is covered by the arching anterior process, which does not have a tooth-like projection on its back side.

As of 2022, it comprises 20 species.

- Cladonota albofasciata Goding, 1893
- Cladonota amazonica Andrade, 1978
- Cladonota atrata Fonesca, 1936
- Cladonota cinerea Fonesca, 1933
- Cladonota crassepunctata Sakakibara, 1971
- Cladonota cryani Flynn, 2022
- Cladonota erwini Flynn, 2018
- Cladonota foliata Funkhouser, 1922
- Cladonota fritzi Sakakibara, 1976
- Cladonota gracilis Sakakibara, 1971
- Cladonota guimaraesi Sakakibara, 1981
- Cladonota latifrons Stål, 1869
- Cladonota lopezi Strümpel, 1973
- Cladonota lydieae Arnaud, 2020
- Cladonota mirabilis Fairmaire, 1846
- Cladonota paradoxa Germar, 1821
- Cladonota ridicula Walker, 1858
- Cladonota rufescens Fonesca, 1933
- Cladonota trilobosa Fonesca & Diringshofen, 1969
- Cladonota undulata Walker, 1851

== Subgenus Lecythifera ==
The subgenus Lecythifera is also characterized by the presence of an intermediate process of the pronotum, and by a toothless anterior process. However, unlike in Cladonota, the intermediate process is not surpassed by the anterior process. The subgenus comprises 21 known species as of 2022. All species with both male and female specimens known are sexually dimorphic, with the exception of C. plummeri.

Species	Authority	Range	Length (Note: Unless otherwise noted, measured from the forehead to the tip of the elytra)	Description	Sexual dimorphism	Image
Cladonota affinis	Fowler, 1894	Mexico, Guatemala	7 mm (0.28 in) (male)			
Cladonota bulbosa	Flynn, 2003	Mexico	5.5 to 6.5 mm (0.22 to 0.26 in)	Intermediate process of the pronotum bears a large bulbous inflation on top, with a smaller arm extending below it towards the anterior process. Males possess a smaller top bulbous inflation, with another small inflation extending anterior to it.	Present	
Cladonota championi	Fowler, 1894	Mexico, Guatemala	6 mm (0.24 in) (male)		Present	
Cladonota costaricensis	Flynn, 2018	Costa Rica	7 mm (0.28 in) (female)		Male unknown	
Cladonota costata	Buckton, 1903					
Cladonota crucifixa	Gálvez & Flynn, 2021					
Cladonota falleni	Stål, 1862					
Cladonota globonegra	Flynn, 2018					
Cladonota gonzaloi	Peláez, 1945					
Cladonota grisea	Flynn, 2018					
Cladonota hoffmanni	Peláez, 1945					
Cladonota inflata	Fowler, 1894		9 mm (0.35 in)			
Cladonota locomotiva	Breddin, 1901					
Cladonota machinula	Breddin, 1901	Ecuador	7 mm (0.28 in)			
Cladonota meteorus	Arnaud, 2002					
Cladonota orellana	Flynn, 2018					
Cladonota pieltaini	Peláez, 1945					
Cladonota plummeri	Peláez, 1945					
Cladonota robustula	Fowler, 1894					
Cladonota siparuna	Strümpel, 1973					
Cladonota yucatanensis	Flynn, 2003		6 mm (0.24 in)			

== Subgenus Lobocladisca ==
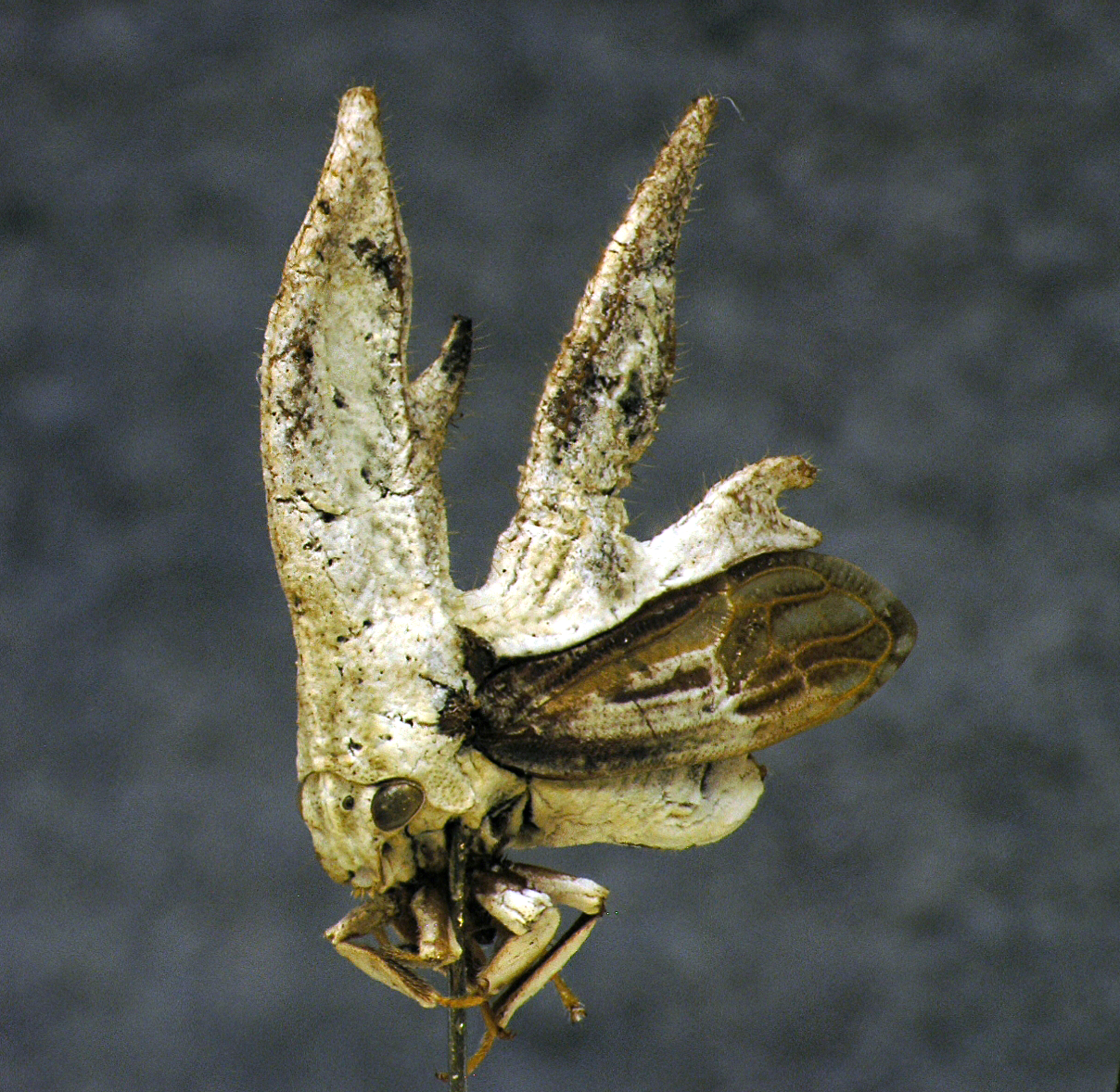
Specimen of Cladonota (Lobocladisca) livida from the Peruvian Amazon

The subgenus Lobocladisca is uniquely distinguished by a small tooth-like projection on the back side of the anterior process. Like in the subgenera Cladonota and Lecythifera, species of this subgenus all have an intermediate process on their pronotum. The subgenus comprises nine species as of 2020, many of them only known from the type specimen or the original description, and thus of uncertain validity. Conversely, Cladonota (Lobocladisca) biclavata is the most common species of the genus in all of South America.

- Cladonota bennetti Kirby, 1829
- Cladonota biclavata Westwood, 1840
- Cladonota clavaria Fairmaire, 1846
- Cladonota livida Buckton, 1903
- Cladonota lobulata Stål, 1869
- Cladonota occidentalis Strümpel, 1973
- Cladonota rigida Stål, 1869
- Cladonota spatulata Fairmaire, 1846
- Cladonota vexillifera Goding, 1893

== Incertae sedis ==
No illustration is known for Cladonota brunnea, and the type specimen, discovered in Brazil, has not been preserved. While it is possibly a genetic variation within C. apicalis, the description is considered too insufficient for assignment at the subgenus level.
