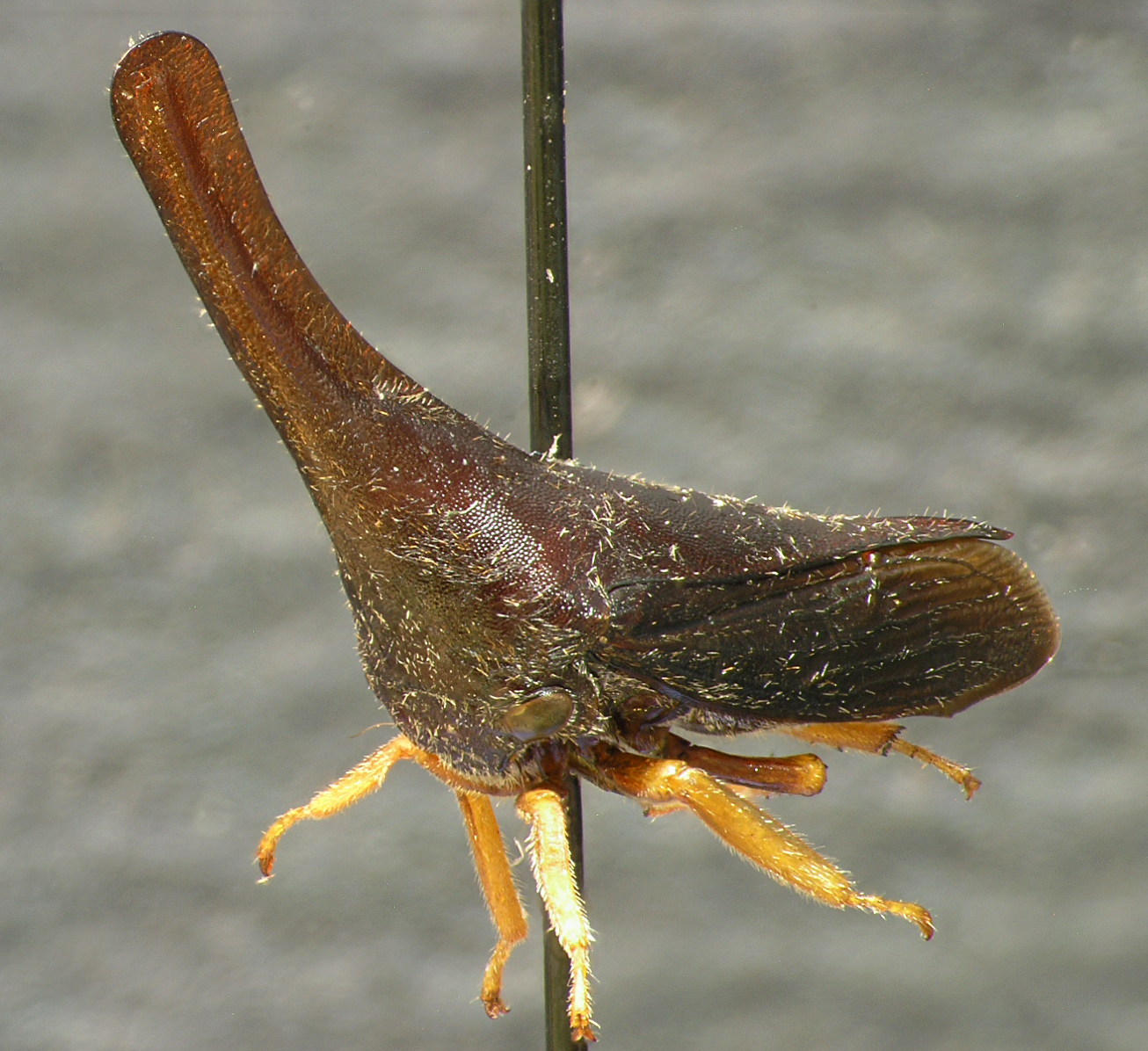
- Aconophora

Scientific classification
- Kingdom: Animalia
- Phylum: Arthropoda
- Class: Insecta
- Order: Hemiptera
- Suborder: Auchenorrhyncha
- Family: Membracidae
- Subfamily: Membracinae

= Membracinae =

Subfamily of treehoppers

Membracinae is a subfamily of treehoppers in the family Membracidae. There are more than 40 genera in Membracinae, mostly recorded from the Americas.

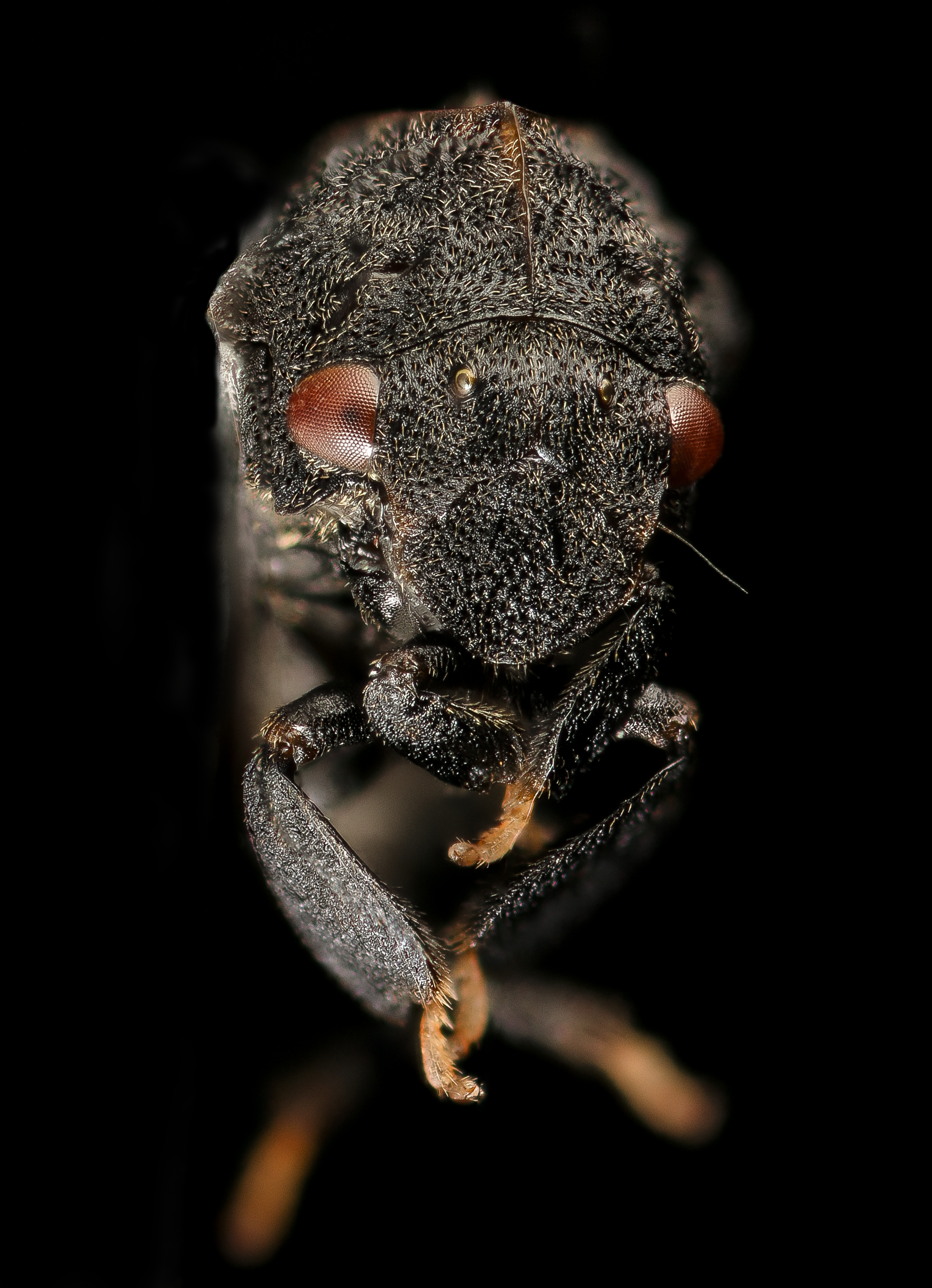
Tylopelta gibbera

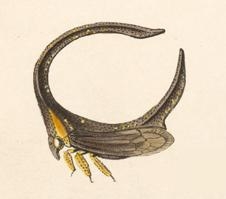
Cladonota

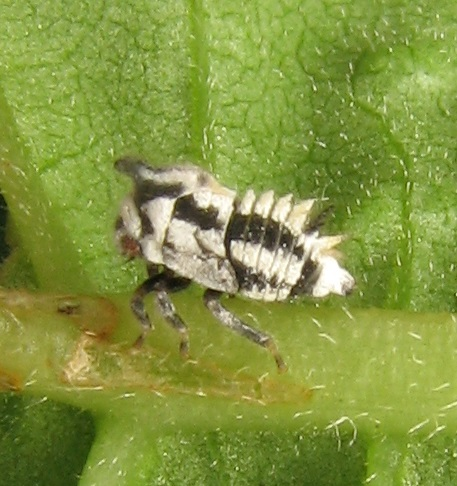
Enchenopa nymph on Juglans, undescribed species.

== Genera ==
These 44 genera belong to the subfamily Membracinae:

- Acanthicoides Metcalf, 1952^{c g}
- Aconophora Fairmaire, 1846^{c g b}
- Alchisme Kirkaldy, 1904^{c g}
- Bolbonota Amyot & Serville, 1843^{c g}
- Bolbonotodes Fowler, 1894^{c g}
- Calloconophora Dietrich, 1991^{c g}
- Campylenchia Stål, 1869^{c g b}
- Cladonota Stål, 1869^{c g}
- Enchenopa Amyot & Audinet-Serville, 1843^{c g b}
- Enchophyllum Amyot & Serville, 1843^{c g}
- Erechtia Walker, 1858^{c g}
- Eunusa Pinto da Fonseca, 1974^{c g}
- Folicarina Sakakibara, 1992^{c g}
- Guayaquila Goding, 1920^{c g}
- Havilandia Dietrich & McKamey, 1995^{c g}
- Hyphinoe Stål, 1867^{c g b}
- Hypsoprora Stål, 1869^{c g b}
- Hypsoprorachis Fonseca & Diringshofen, 1969^{c g}
- Jibarita Ramos, 1957^{c g}
- Kronides Kirkaldy, 1904^{c g}
- Leioscyta Fowler, 1894^{c g b}
- Lewdeitzia Dietrich & McKamey, 1995^{c g}
- Membracis Fabricius, 1775^{c g}
- Metcalfiella Linnavuori, 1955^{c g}
- Microschema Stål, 1869^{c g}
- Notocera Amyot & Serville, 1843^{c g}
- Ochropepla Stål, 1869^{c g}
- Paragara Goding, 1926^{c g}
- Philya Walker, 1858^{c g b}
- Phyllotropis Stål, 1869^{c g}
- Platycotis Stål, 1869^{c g b}
- Potnia Stål, 1866^{c g}
- Potnioides Creao-Duarte, 1997^{c g}
- Pseuderechtia Sakakibara, 2012
- Ramosella McKamey & Deitz, 1996^{c g}
- Sakakibarella Creao-Duarte, 1997^{c g}
- Scalmophorus Fowler, 1894^{c g}
- Stalotypa Metcalf, 1927^{c g}
- Stirpis McKamey & Deitz, 1996^{c g}
- Talipes Deitz, 1975
- Tritropidia Stãl, 1869^{c g}
- Tropidoscyta Stål, 1869^{g}
- Turrialbia McKamey & Deitz, 1996^{c g}
- Tylopelta Fowler, 1894^{c g b}
- Umbonia Burmeister, 1835^{c g b}

Data sources: i = ITIS, c = Catalogue of Life, g = GBIF, b = Bugguide.net
