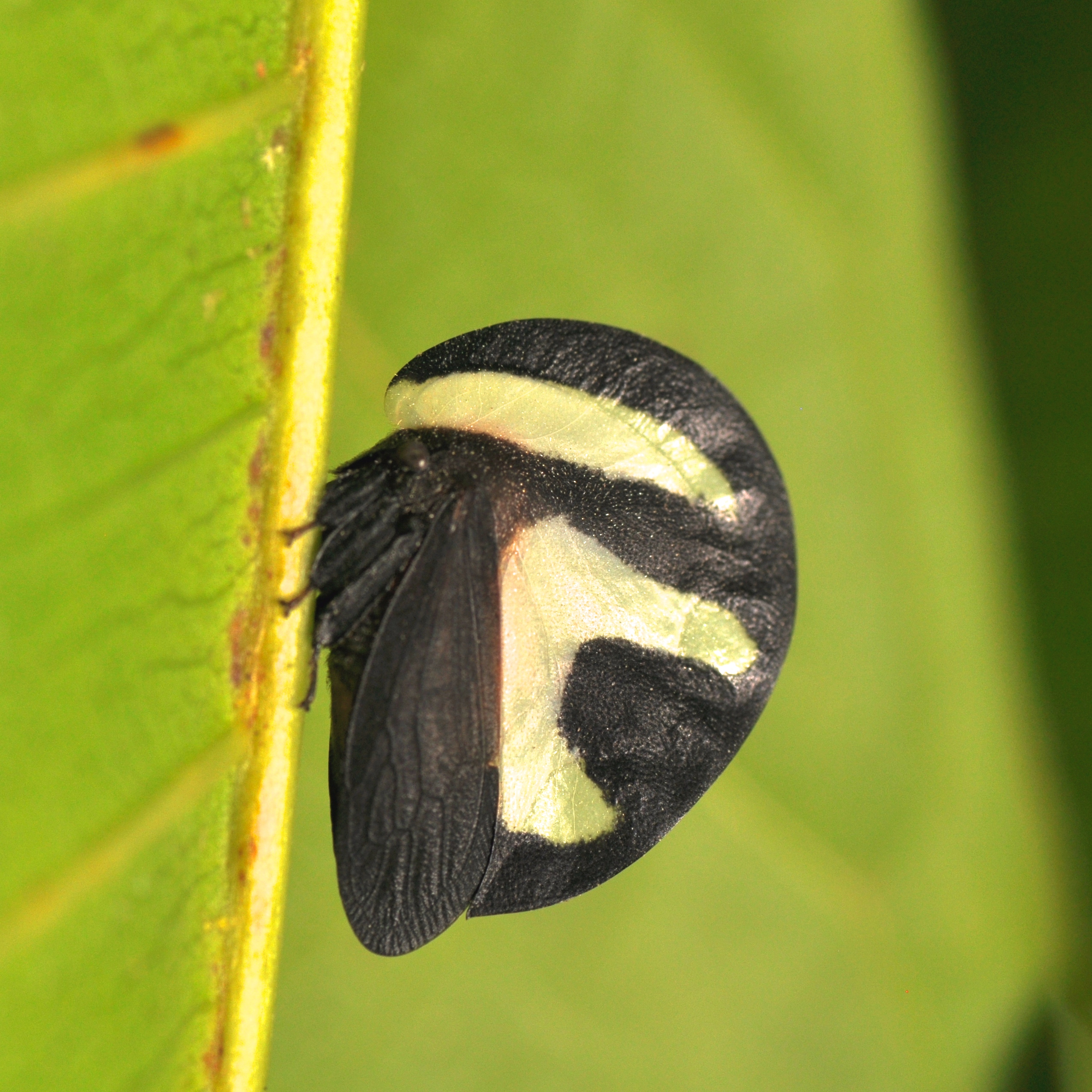

Scientific classification
- Kingdom: Animalia
- Phylum: Arthropoda
- Class: Insecta
- Order: Hemiptera
- Suborder: Auchenorrhyncha
- Family: Membracidae
- Genus: Membracis
- Species: M. foliata

Binomial name
- Membracis foliata Linnaeus, 1758

= Membracis foliata =

Species of insect

Membracis foliata is a species of treehopper in the subfamily Membracinae. It was first described by Carl Linnaeus in 1758.
