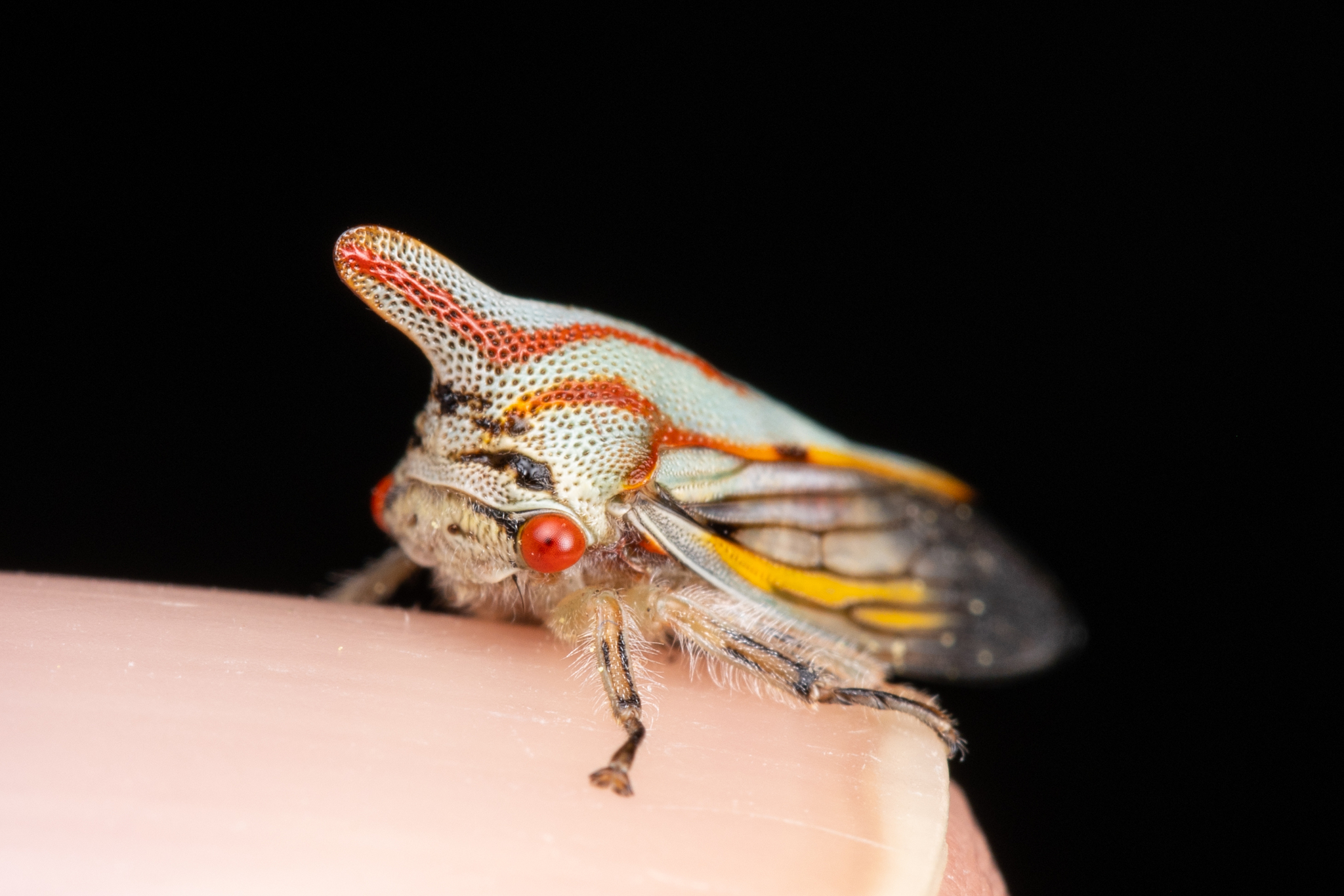

Scientific classification
- Kingdom: Animalia
- Phylum: Arthropoda
- Class: Insecta
- Order: Hemiptera
- Suborder: Auchenorrhyncha
- Family: Membracidae
- Subfamily: Membracinae
- Tribe: Hoplophorionini
- Genus: Platycotis
- Species: P. vittata

Binomial name
- Platycotis vittata (Fabricius, 1803)

= Platycotis vittata =

Species of true bug

Platycotis vittata, the oak treehopper, is a species of treehopper in the family Membracidae, found in North America. The species is also called Platycotis vittatus. It is an oak specialist. Adults protect the nymphs, an example of parental care.

== Description ==
Adult oak treehoppers are typically 9 to 13 mm (0.35 - 0.5 in) long. Their colors vary from sea green to bronze or olive green, or they can be pale blue with red dots or four lengthwise stripes. The wings are clear with yellow along the front margin and black lines along the veins. The prothorax extends to a sharp point.
