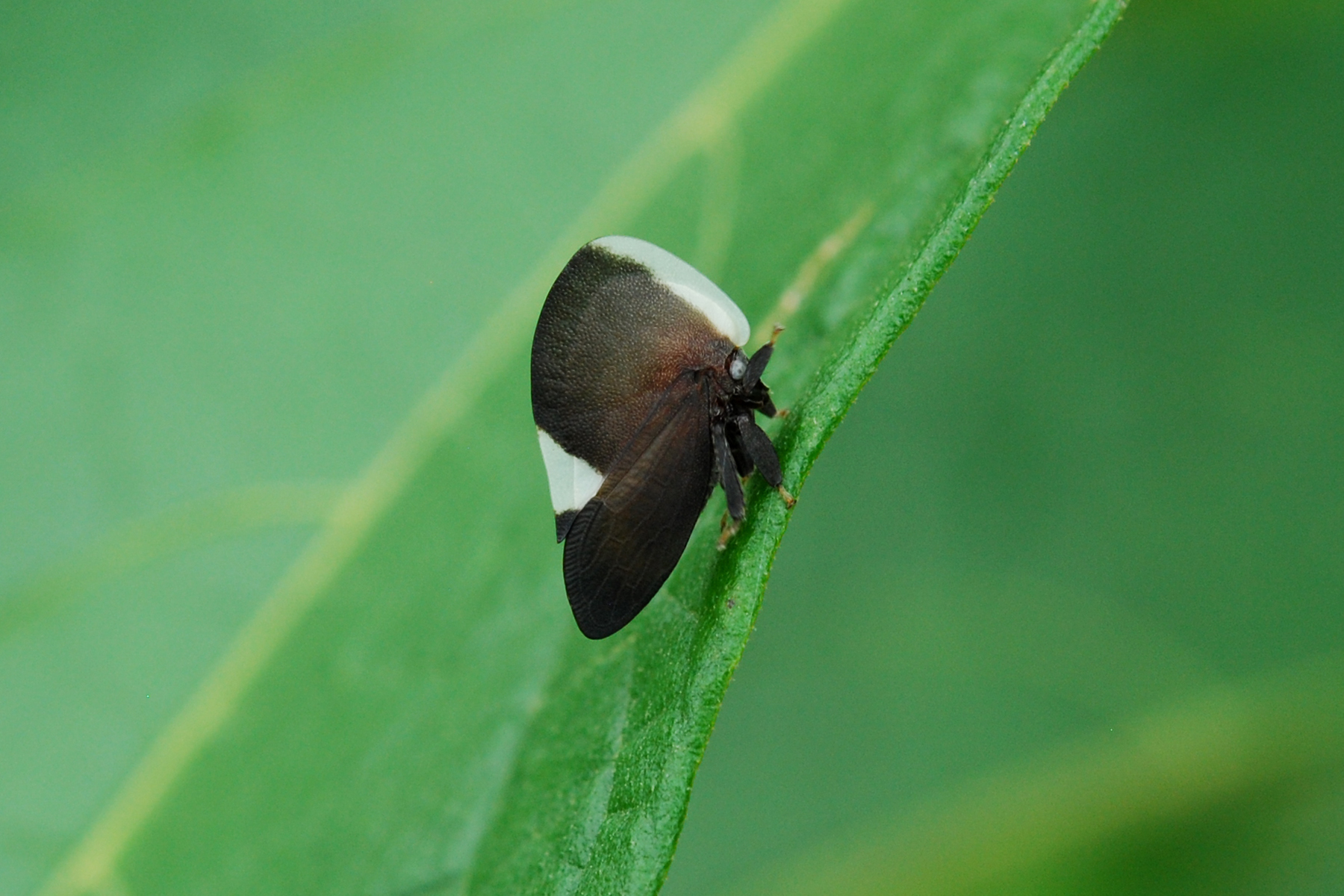
- Membracis dorsata

Scientific classification
- Kingdom: Animalia
- Phylum: Arthropoda
- Class: Insecta
- Order: Hemiptera
- Suborder: Auchenorrhyncha
- Family: Membracidae
- Subfamily: Membracinae
- Tribe: Membracini
- Genus: Membracis; Fabricius, 1775

= Membracis =

Genus of true bugs

Membracis is a genus of treehoppers in the family Membracidae. There are more than 50 described species in Membracis, generally found in Latin America.

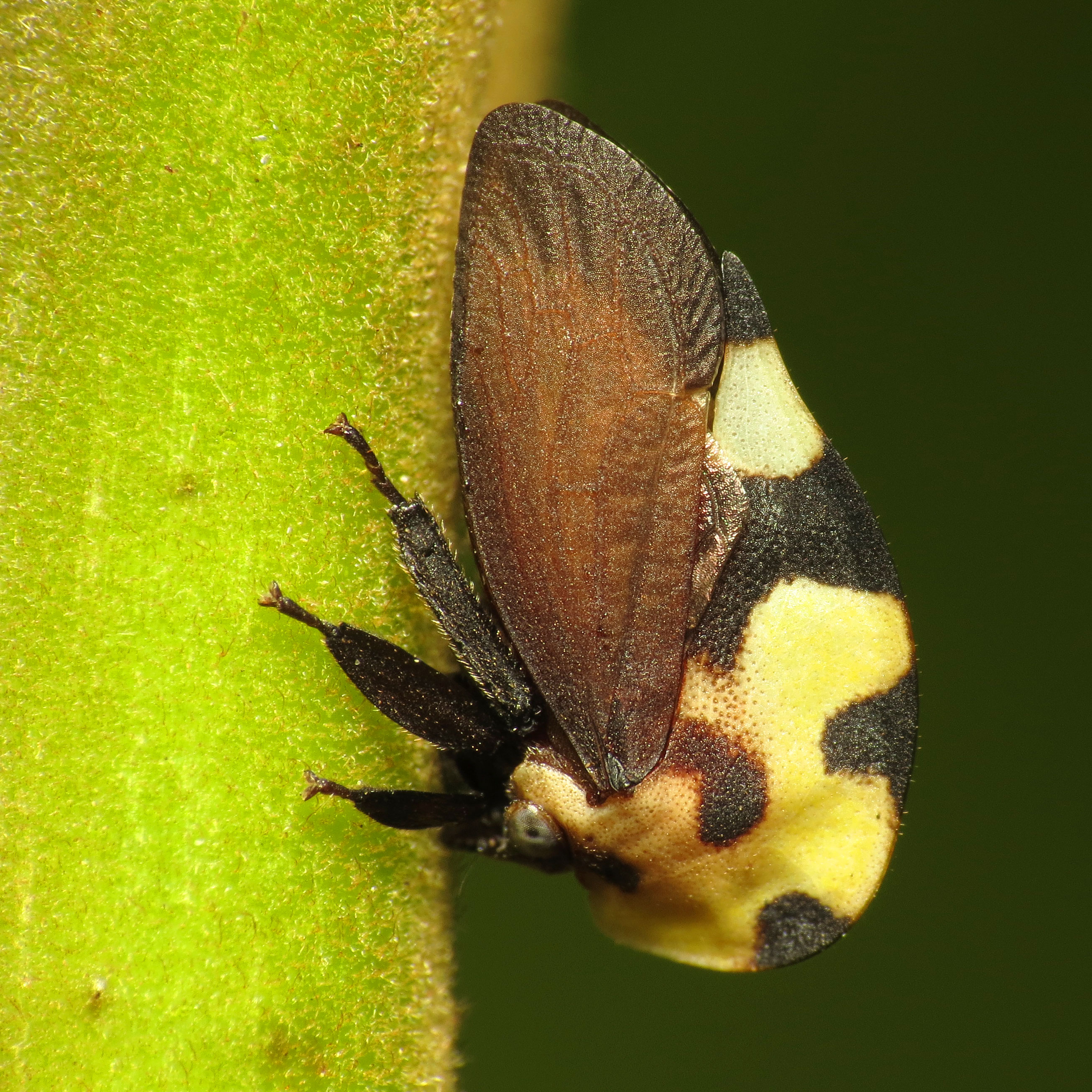
Membracis mexicana

== Species ==
These 51 species belong to the genus Membracis:

- Membracis albolimbata Fowler
- Membracis ambigua Fairmaire
- Membracis caquetaensis Richter
- Membracis carinata Weber
- Membracis carinulata Richter
- Membracis celsa Walker
- Membracis compressa Fabricius
- Membracis confusa Fairmaire
- Membracis consobrina Costa
- Membracis continua Walker
- Membracis contornata Sakakibara, 1992
- Membracis dorsata Fabricius
- Membracis fabricii Metcalf & Wade, 1965
- Membracis fairmairi Goding, 1928
- Membracis fenestrina Schumacher
- Membracis flava Richter
- Membracis flaveola Gmelin
- Membracis foliata Linnaeus
- Membracis foliataarcuata DeGeer
- Membracis foliatafasciata
- Membracis foliatafusca DeGeer
- Membracis fonsecai Sakakibara, 1992
- Membracis formosa Richter
- Membracis fusifera Walker
- Membracis juncta Walker
- Membracis lefebvrei Fairmaire
- Membracis linki Sakakibara, 1980
- Membracis luizae Evangelista & Sakakibara, 2010
- Membracis lunata Fabricius
- Membracis mexicana Guérin-Méneville, 1829
- Membracis micaniaae Richter
- Membracis micans Buckton
- Membracis mimica
- Membracis nigra Olivier, 1792
- Membracis notulata Sakakibara, 1992
- Membracis orteguazaensis Richter
- Membracis paullula Richter
- Membracis peruviana Fairmaire
- Membracis provittata Buckton
- Membracis rectangula Costa
- Membracis robiginosa Richter
- Membracis sanguineoplaga Schmidt, 1906
- Membracis schultesii Richter
- Membracis serratipes Goding
- Membracis subulata Weber
- Membracis suctifructus Boulard & Couturier, 1991
- Membracis tectigera Olivier
- Membracis tricolor Fairmaire
- Membracis trifasciata Stål
- Membracis trimaculata Fairmaire
- Membracis zonata Fairmaire
