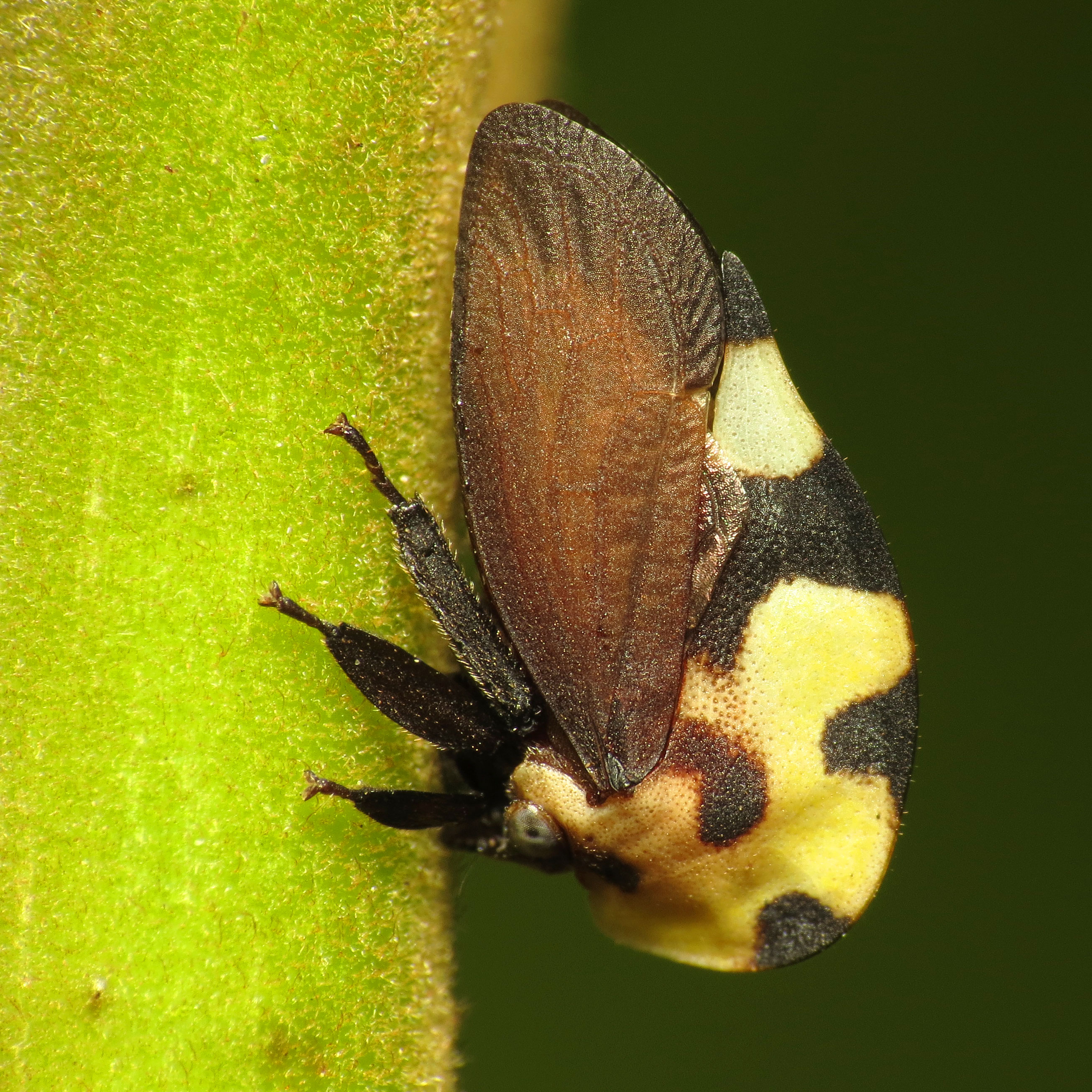

Scientific classification
- Kingdom: Animalia
- Phylum: Arthropoda
- Clade: Pancrustacea
- Class: Insecta
- Order: Hemiptera
- Suborder: Auchenorrhyncha
- Family: Membracidae
- Genus: Membracis
- Species: M. mexicana

Binomial name
- Membracis mexicana Guérin-Méneville, 1829

= Membracis mexicana =

Species of insect

Membracis mexicana is a species of treehopper within the family Membracidae. The species can be found distributed from California to Colombia and Ecuador. The coloration of adults is black with yellow markings on the body, whereas nymphs start out black before eventually becoming white with 3 black dots and a reddish belt separating thorax and abdomen. Adults are considered minor pests in crops such as Avocados.
