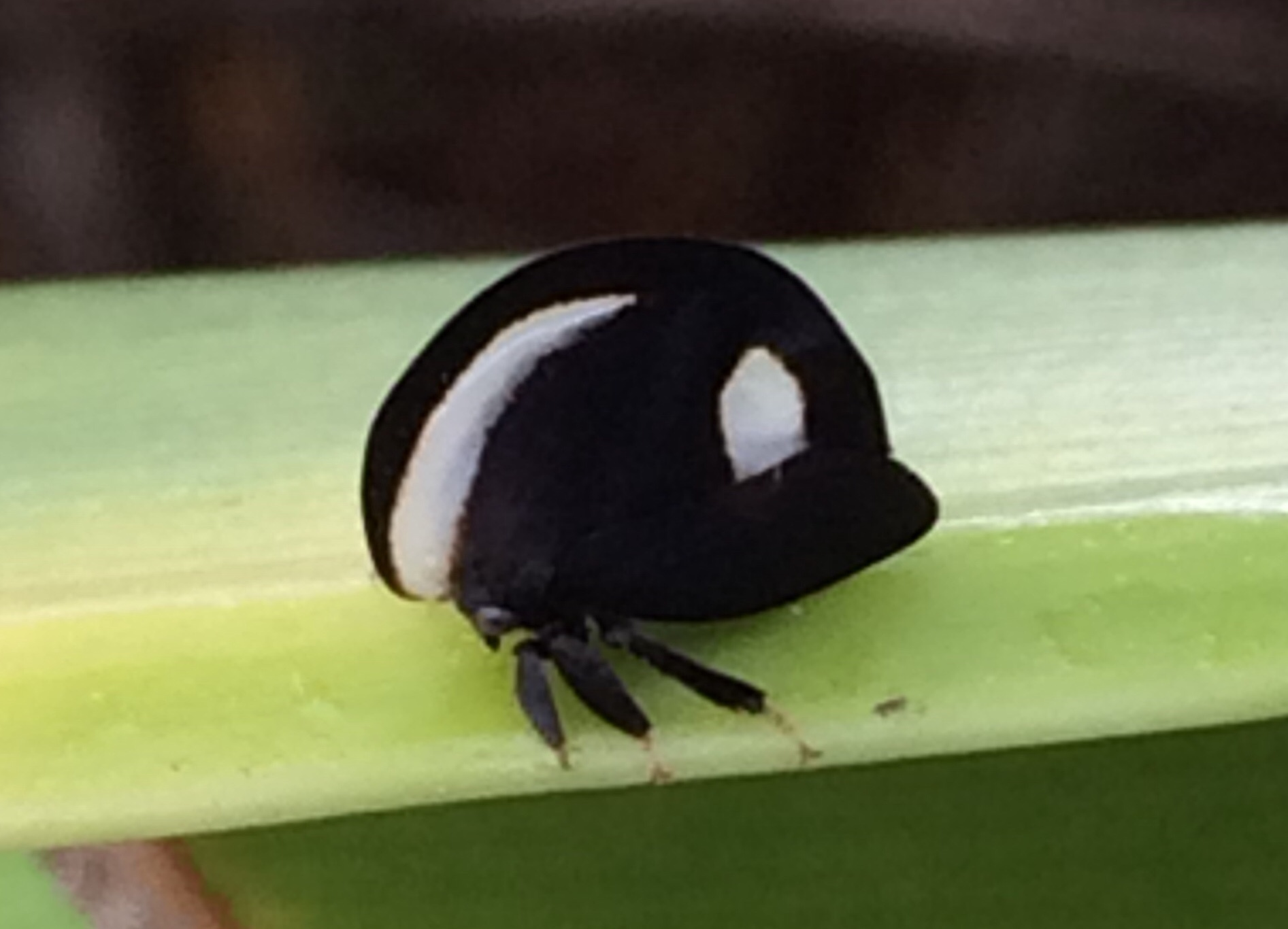

Scientific classification
- Domain: Eukaryota
- Kingdom: Animalia
- Phylum: Arthropoda
- Class: Insecta
- Order: Hemiptera
- Suborder: Auchenorrhyncha
- Family: Membracidae
- Genus: Membracis
- Species: M. luizae

Binomial name
- Membracis luizae Evangelista and Sakakibara, 2010

= Membracis luizae =

Species of insect

Membracis lunata is a species of treehopper described in 2010.
