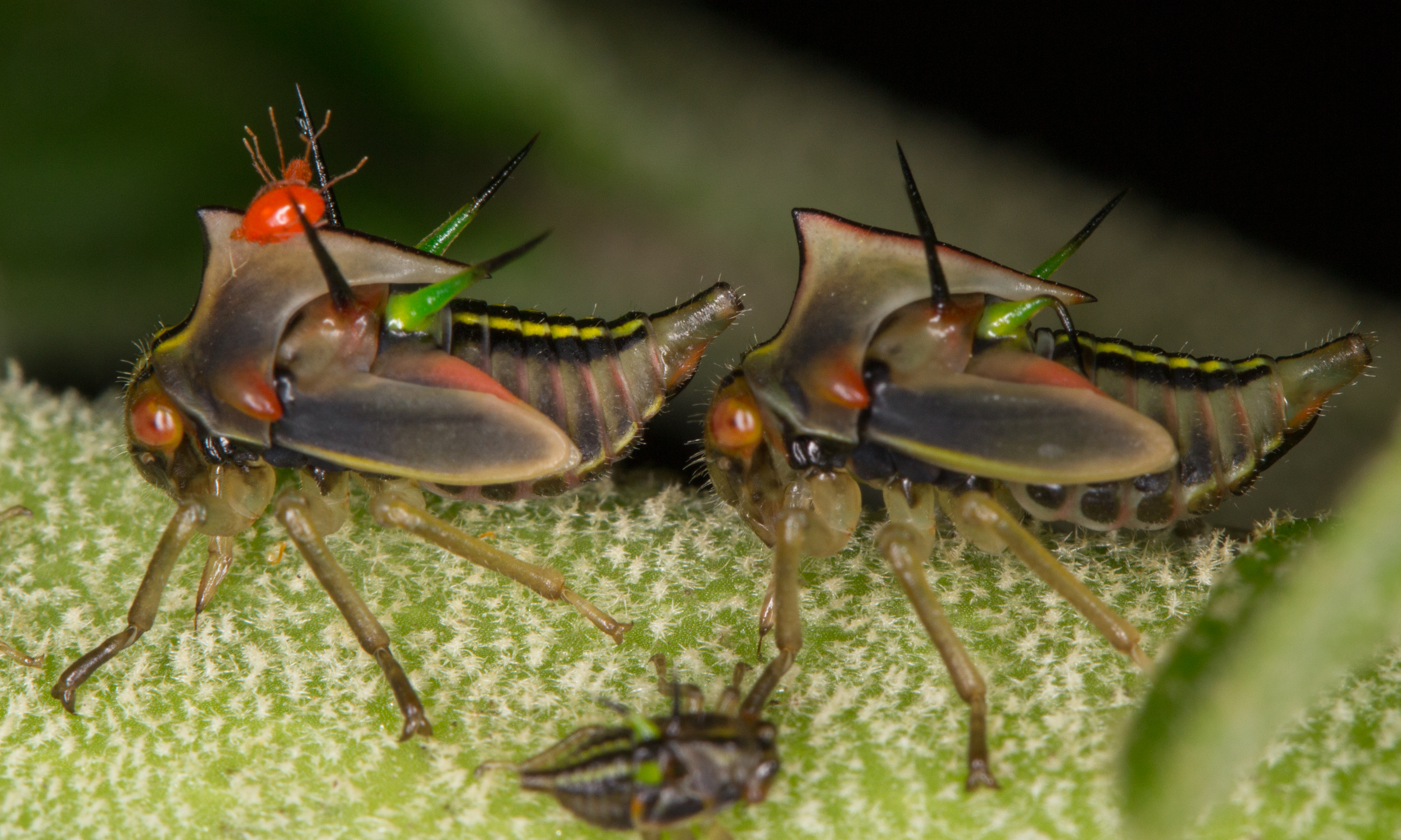
- Alchisme grossa

Scientific classification
- Domain: Eukaryota
- Kingdom: Animalia
- Phylum: Arthropoda
- Class: Insecta
- Order: Hemiptera
- Suborder: Auchenorrhyncha
- Family: Membracidae
- Subfamily: Membracinae
- Genus: Alchisme; Kirkaldy, 1904

= Alchisme =

Genus of insects

Alchisme is a genus of treehoppers within the family Membracidae. Members of this genus can be found in Central and South America.

== Species ==
- Alchisme antigua Funkhouser, 1943
- Alchisme apicalis Walker, 1851
- Alchisme banosiensis Creão-Duarte & Sakakibara, 1997
- Alchisme bordoni Creão-Duarte & Sakakibara, 1997
- Alchisme bos Fairmaire, 1846
- Alchisme colombiana Creão-Duarte & Sakakibara, 1997
- Alchisme contundent Creao-Duarte
- Alchisme cultellata Creão-Duarte & Sakakibara, 1997
- Alchisme deflexa Creão-Duarte & Sakakibara, 1997
- Alchisme elevata Goding, 1930
- Alchisme erecta Creão-Duarte & Sakakibara, 1997
- Alchisme fastidiosa Fairmaire, 1846
- Alchisme frontomaculata Creão-Duarte & Sakakibara, 1997
- Alchisme goiana Creão-Duarte & Sakakibara, 1997
- Alchisme grossa Fairmaire, 1846
- Alchisme henryi Creão-Duarte & Sakakibara, 1997
- Alchisme inermis Fairmaire, 1846
- Alchisme insolita Creão-Duarte & Sakakibara, 1997
- Alchisme laticornis Funkhouser, 1940
- Alchisme mackameyi Creão-Duarte & Sakakibara, 1997
- Alchisme nigrocarinata Fairmaire
- Alchisme obscura Walker, 1851
- Alchisme onorei Creão-Duarte & Sakakibara, 1997
- Alchisme pinguicornis Funkhouser, 1940
- Alchisme randalli Creao-Duarte
- Alchisme recurva Stål, 1869
- Alchisme rubrocostata Spinola, 1852
- Alchisme sagittata Germar, 1830
- Alchisme salta Creão-Duarte & Sakakibara, 1997
- Alchisme schuhi Creão-Duarte & Sakakibara, 1997
- Alchisme sordida Germar, 1821
- Alchisme testacea Fairmaire, 1846
- Alchisme tridentata Fairmaire, 1846
- Alchisme truncaticornis Germar, 1835
- Alchisme turrita Germar, 1835
- Alchisme ustulata Fairmaire, 1846
- Alchisme veruta Fowler, 1894
- Alchisme virescens Fairmaire, 1846
