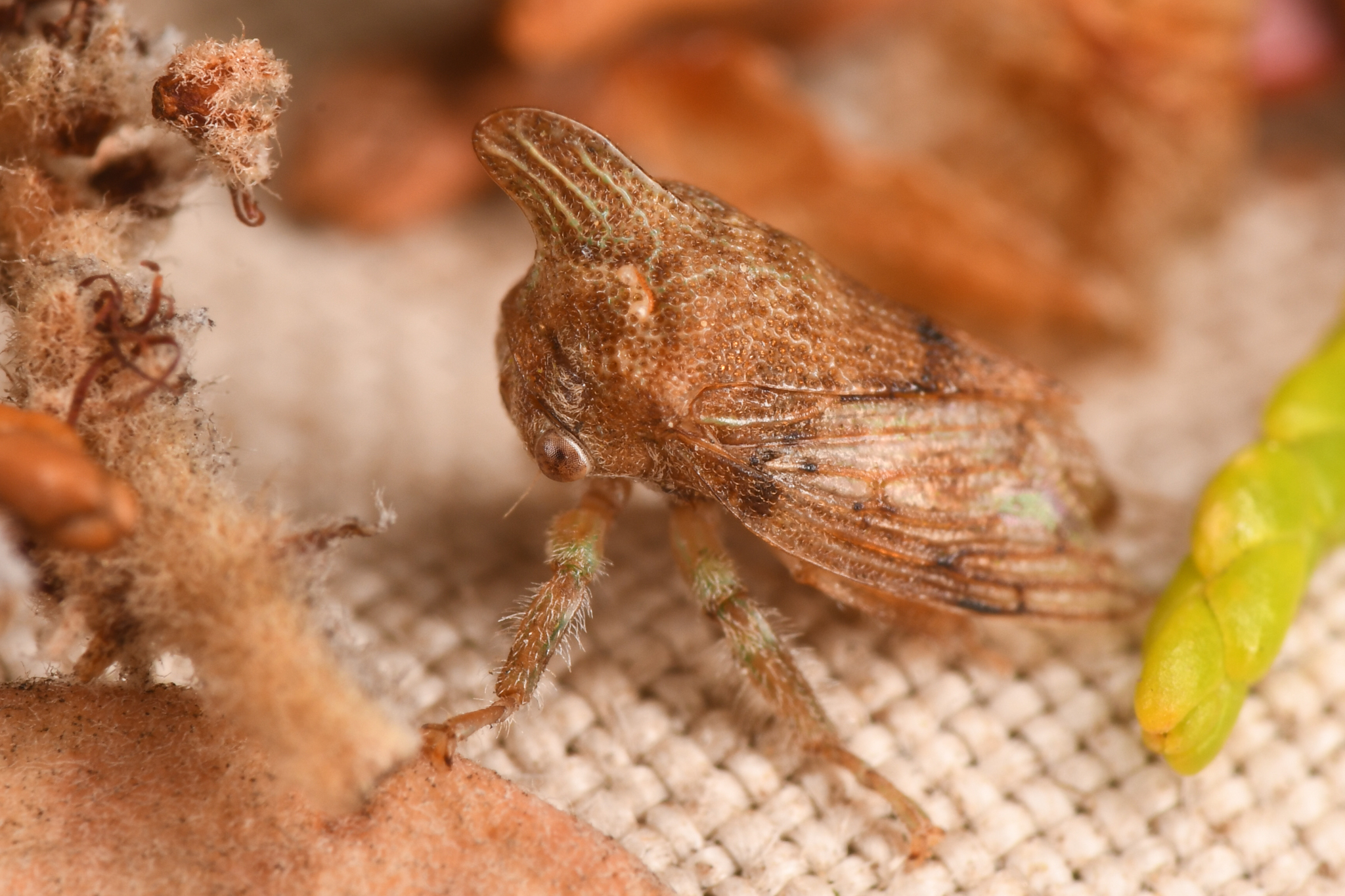
- Playtcotis minax photographed by Chloe and Trevor Van Loon, Humboldt County, California, 2022

Scientific classification
- Kingdom: Animalia
- Phylum: Arthropoda
- Class: Insecta
- Order: Hemiptera
- Suborder: Auchenorrhyncha
- Family: Membracidae
- Genus: Platycotis
- Species: P. minax

Binomial name
- Platycotis minax Goding, 1892

= Platycotis minax =

Species of treehopper

Platycotis minax is a species of leafhopper native to California. It was first described by diplomat and entomologist Frederic Webster Goding in 1892. According to the U.S. Forest Service, in southern California P. minax is found on coast live oak and possibly other oaks.
