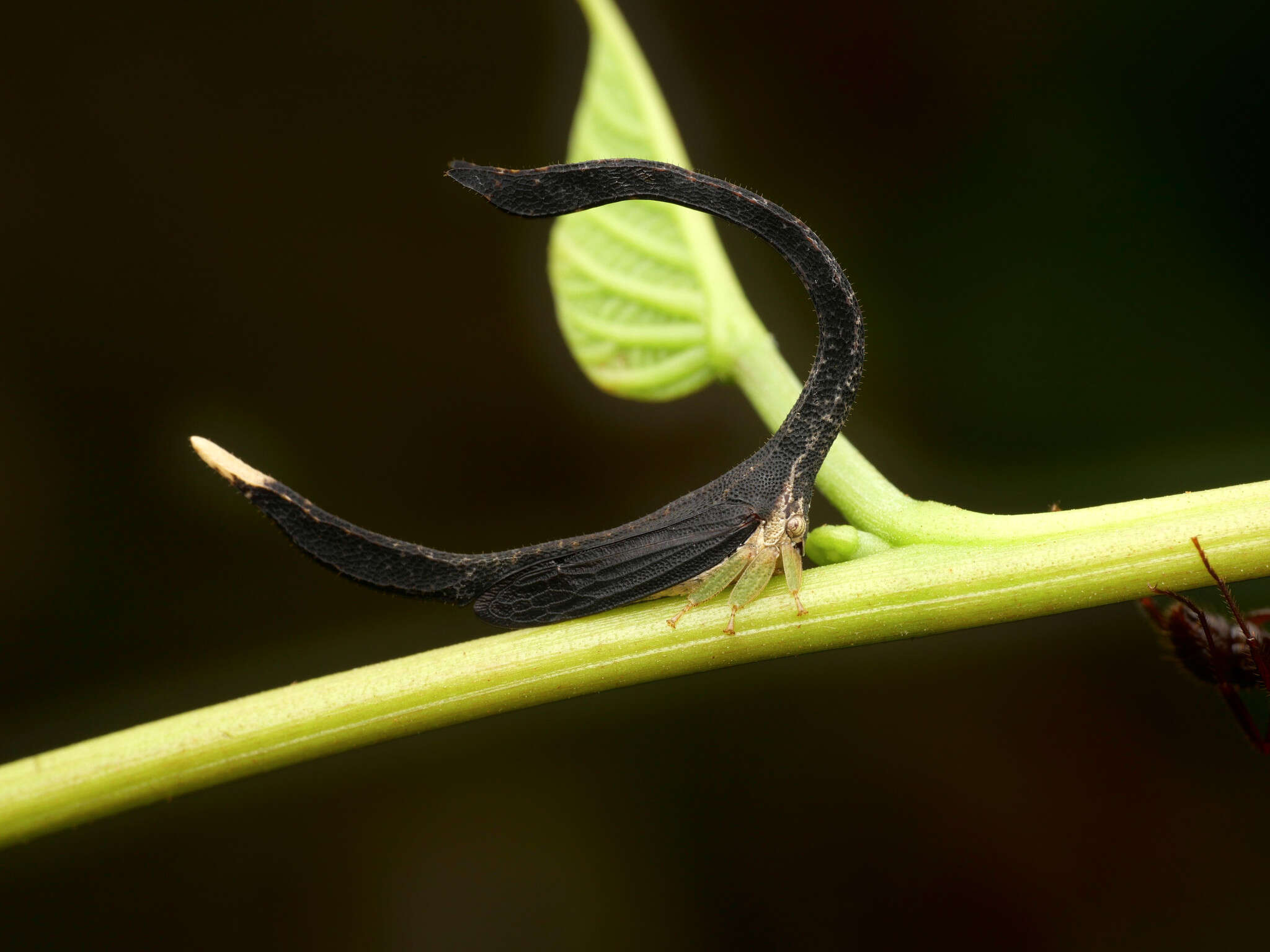
- Cladonota apicalis

Scientific classification
- Kingdom: Animalia
- Phylum: Arthropoda
- Class: Insecta
- Order: Hemiptera
- Suborder: Auchenorrhyncha
- Family: Membracidae
- Subfamily: Membracinae
- Genus: Cladonota; Stål, 1869

Type species
- Membracis paradoxus Germar, 1821

Subgenera
- Falculifera McKamey, 1997; Cladonota Stål, 1869; Lecythifera Fowler, 1894; Lobocladisca Stål, 1869

Diversity
- 59 described species

= Cladonota =

Genus of treehopper

Cladonota is a genus of neotropical treehoppers (family Membracidae) widespread from Mexico to South America. They are known for their elaborate pronotum shapes, hypothesized to play a role in camouflage or mate recognition, although their function is not yet known with certainty. Previously described as a subgenus of Sphongophorus, it was recognized as a genus of its own right in 1997 after the latter was synonymized with Hypsauchenia.

== Description ==
The genus is distinguished from other treehoppers by its highly elaborate pronotum, which in many species bears an elongated, curved anterior process or an ornate intermediate process, giving them an appearance variously called "grotesque" and "particularly charismatic". Resembling various natural elements from twigs, leaves and seeds to bird droppings, the pronotum is believed to help them camouflage in their natural habitat. Other explanations for the pronotum's structure include mate recognition, as well as providing an extended surface area for their sensory setae. While a popular hypothesis, the use of the pronotum for camouflage has not yet been empirically tested as of 2020. Despite their seemingly burdensome pronota, Cladonota treehoppers are capable of both jumping and flying.

In most Cladonota species, the male is smaller than the female, often with a less developed pronotum and darker colors. More drastic sexual dimorphism can also be present, with completely different pronotum shapes between male and female, which has often lead to the misidentification of males and females as constituting separate species.

=== Life cycle ===
Like all hemipterans, Cladonota species are hemimetabolous, with a nymph stage directly preceding the adult or imago.

=== Ecology ===
The primary predators of Cladonota are birds, from which their pronotum shapes are believed to help camouflage.

Most species are solitary as nymphs and adults, although some have been observed to live in groups of two or three. The ant Ectatomma ruidum is known to attend to nymphs of some species in a mutualistic relationship. Ant-tended groups of three or four individuals have been reported.

Males of C. apicalis use substrate vibrations as a way to attract females, and also emit sounds and wing vibrations for courting. Wing buzzing has also been reported as a deterrence strategy against ants and possibly predators.

Some species are known to have specific plant hosts on which reproduction and nymph development occur, such as Sabicea cinerea for C. foliata, or Piper hispidum, among others, for C. apicalis.

== Distribution ==
Cladonota has a neotropical distribution, and is known to range from Mexico to Argentina. The most widespread species in the genus are Cladonota apicalis in Central America and Cladonota biclavata in South America.

== History and classification ==
The genus Cladonota is part of the treehopper subfamily Membracinae. Inside this subfamily, it belongs to the tribe Hypsoprorini, of which it is the largest genus.

Most of the species now recognized as part of Cladonota were originally described as part of the genus Sphongophorus. In 1869, Cladonota was established as a subgenus of Sphongophorus by Carl Stål, comprising its New World species. After Sphongophorus was found by McKamey in 1997 to be a junior objective synonym of Hypsauchenia, Cladonota was elevated to genus rank, with Cladonota paradoxa designated as the type species.

== Taxonomy ==
Cladonota includes a total of 59 described species so far. The genus is divided into four subgenera: Falculifera, Cladonota, Lecythifera, and Lobocladisca. The former subgenus Acanthonota, which included only C. livida, was synonymized with Lobocladisca in 2003.

Subgenera and species of Cladonota are mostly distinguished by their pronotum structure, but also by their face, legs and wings. Genitalia are not distinctive for species characterization. Alongside the four subgenera, one incertae sedis species is known, Cladonota brunnea (Fallou, 1890).

=== Falculifera ===
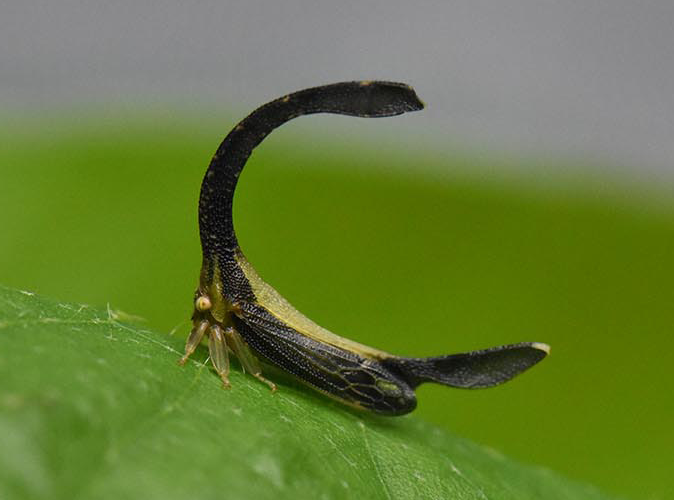
Specimen of Cladonota (Falculifera) rex from Costa Rica

Falculifera is distinguished from the other subgenera by the lack of an intermediate process on the pronotum. The latter is usually C-shaped, with the posterior process extending in an oblique direction.

As of 2020, the subgenus comprises the following eight species, making it the least speciose of the Cladonota subgenera.

- Cladonota apicalis Stål, 1869
- Cladonota benitezi Arnaud, 2004
- Cladonota bolivari Peláez, 1945
- Cladonota clavigera Stål, 1864
- Cladonota luctuosa Peláez, 1945
- Cladonota rex England et al., 2020
- Cladonota rothschildi Flynn, 2018
- Cladonota zeledoni Peláez, 1967

=== Cladonota ===
Unlike Falculifera, the type subgenus Cladonota possesses an intermediate process on the pronotum. It is covered by the arching anterior process, which does not have a tooth-like projection on its back side.

As of 2022, it comprises 20 species.

- Cladonota albofasciata Goding, 1893
- Cladonota amazonica Andrade, 1978
- Cladonota atrata Fonesca, 1936
- Cladonota cinerea Fonesca, 1933
- Cladonota crassepunctata Sakakibara, 1971
- Cladonota cryani Flynn, 2022
- Cladonota erwini Flynn, 2018
- Cladonota foliata Funkhouser, 1922
- Cladonota fritzi Sakakibara, 1976
- Cladonota gracilis Sakakibara, 1971
- Cladonota guimaraesi Sakakibara, 1981
- Cladonota latifrons Stål, 1869
- Cladonota lopezi Strümpel, 1973
- Cladonota lydieae Arnaud, 2020
- Cladonota mirabilis Fairmaire, 1846
- Cladonota paradoxa Germar, 1821
- Cladonota ridicula Walker, 1858
- Cladonota rufescens Fonesca, 1933
- Cladonota trilobosa Fonesca & Diringshofen, 1969
- Cladonota undulata Walker, 1851

=== Lecythifera ===
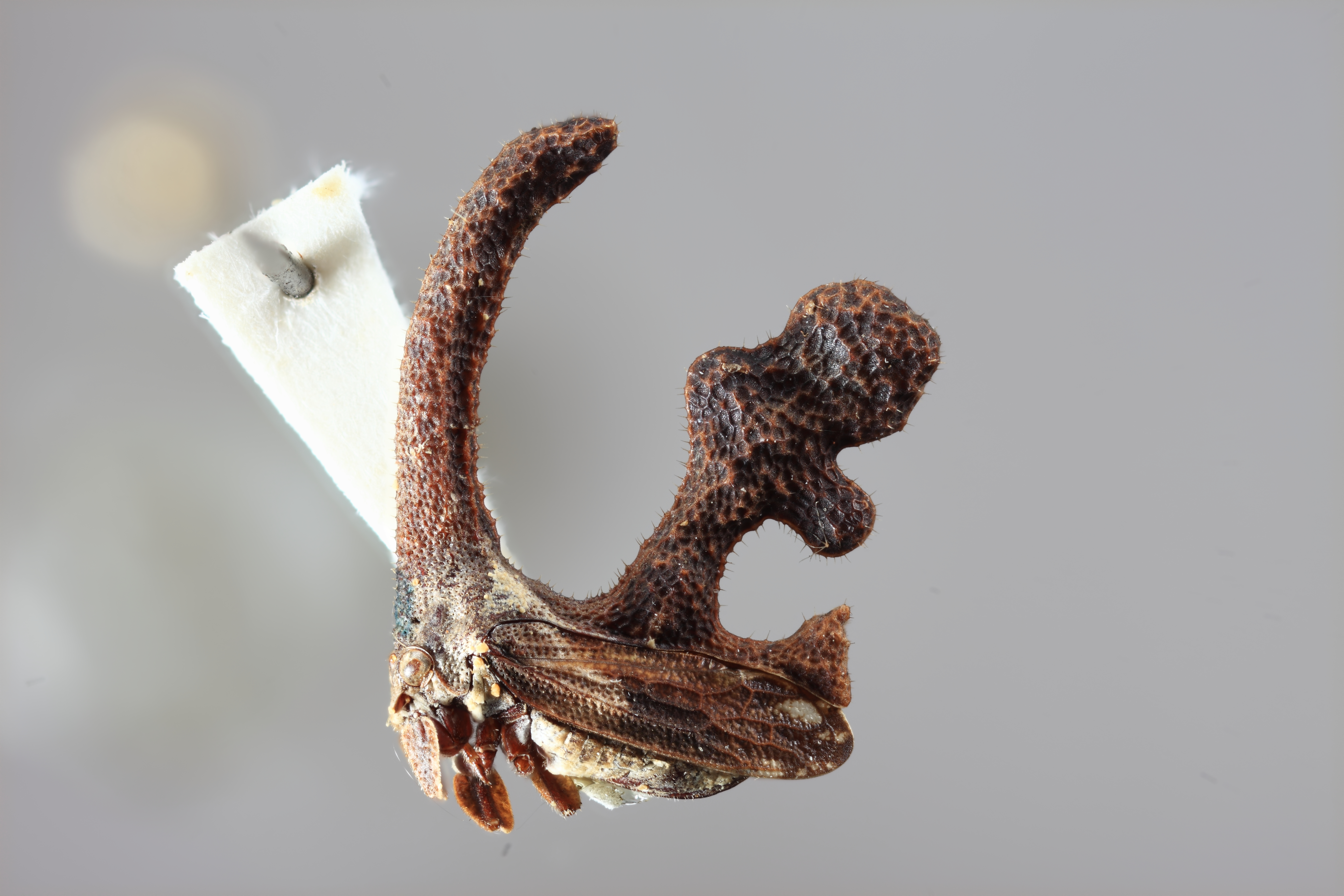
Specimen of Cladonota (Lecythifera) yucatanensis from Yucatan, Mexico

The subgenus Lecythifera is also characterized by the presence of an intermediate process of the pronotum, and by a toothless anterior process. However, unlike in Cladonota, the intermediate process is not surpassed by the anterior process. The subgenus comprises 21 known species as of 2022. All species with both male and female specimens known are sexually dimorphic, with the exception of C. plummeri.

Lecythifera was originally described by Fowler in 1894, but was synonymized with Cladonota (at the time a subgenus of Spongophorus) in 1928, and reinstated in 2003.

- Cladonota affinis Fowler, 1894
- Cladonota bulbosa Flynn, 2003
- Cladonota championi Fowler, 1894
- Cladonota costaricensis Flynn, 2018
- Cladonota costata Buckton, 1903
- Cladonota crucifixa Gálvez & Flynn, 2021
- Cladonota falleni Stål, 1862
- Cladonota globonegra Flynn, 2018
- Cladonota gonzaloi Peláez, 1945
- Cladonota grisea Flynn, 2018
- Cladonota hoffmanni Peláez, 1945
- Cladonota inflata Fowler, 1894
- Cladonota locomotiva Breddin, 1901
- Cladonota machinula Breddin, 1901
- Cladonota meteorus Arnaud, 2002
- Cladonota orellana Flynn, 2018
- Cladonota pieltaini Peláez, 1945
- Cladonota plummeri Peláez, 1945
- Cladonota robustula Fowler, 1894
- Cladonota siparuna Strümpel, 1973
- Cladonota yucatanensis Flynn, 2003

=== Lobocladisca ===
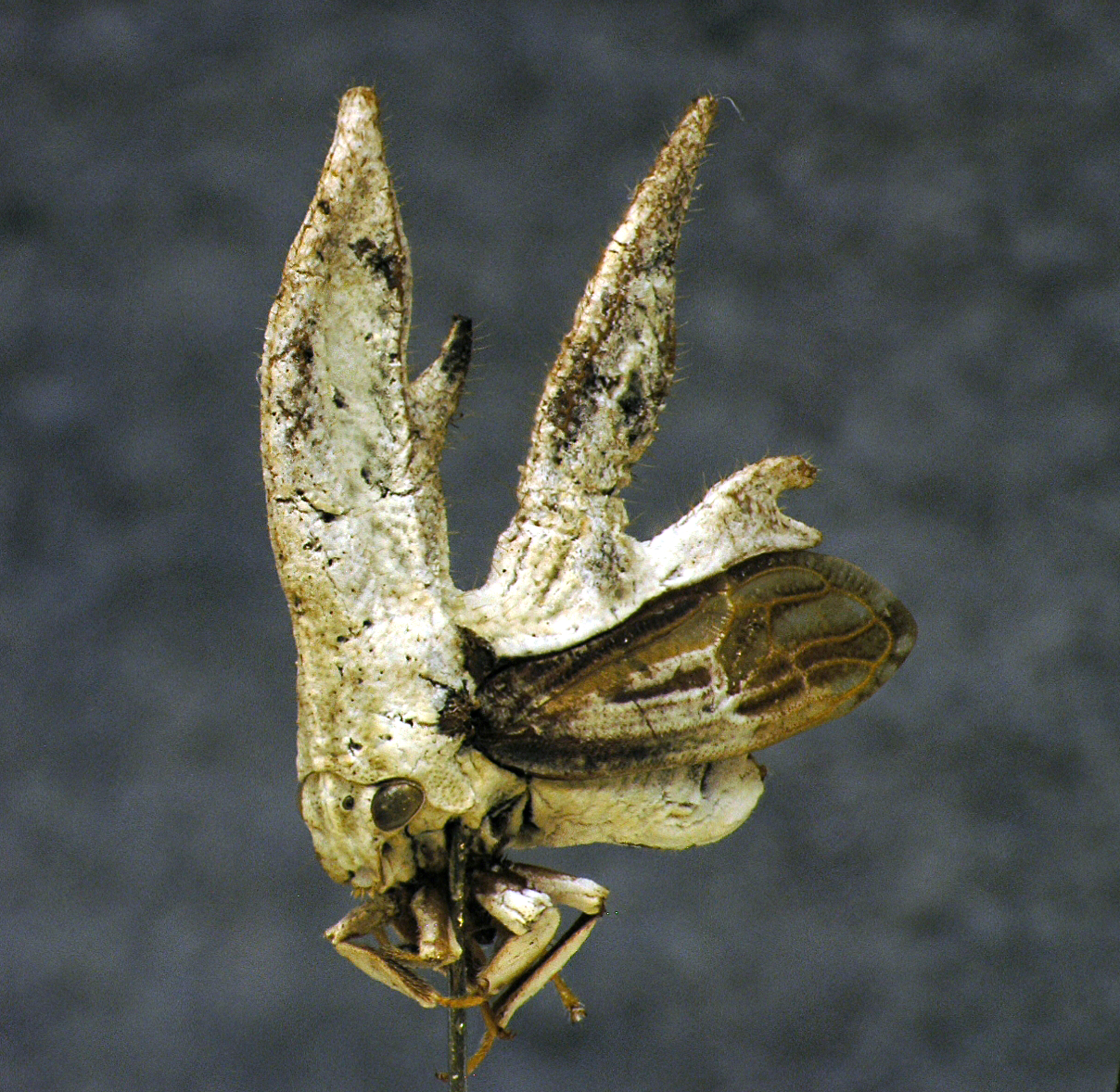
Specimen of Cladonota (Lobocladisca) livida from the Peruvian Amazon

The subgenus Lobocladisca is uniquely distinguished by a small tooth-like projection on the back side of the anterior process. Like in the subgenera Cladonota and Lecythifera, species of this subgenus all have an intermediate process on their pronotum. The subgenus comprises nine species as of 2020, many of them only known from the type specimen or the original description, and thus of uncertain validity. Conversely, Cladonota (Lobocladisca) biclavata is the most common species of the genus in all of South America.

- Cladonota bennetti Kirby, 1829
- Cladonota biclavata Westwood, 1840
- Cladonota clavaria Fairmaire, 1846
- Cladonota livida Buckton, 1903
- Cladonota lobulata Stål, 1869
- Cladonota occidentalis Strümpel, 1973
- Cladonota rigida Stål, 1869
- Cladonota spatulata Fairmaire, 1846
- Cladonota vexillifera Goding, 1893

=== Incertae sedis ===
No illustration is known for Cladonota brunnea, and the type specimen, discovered in Brazil, has not been preserved. While it is possibly a genetic variation within C. apicalis, the description is considered too insufficient for assignment at the subgenus level.
