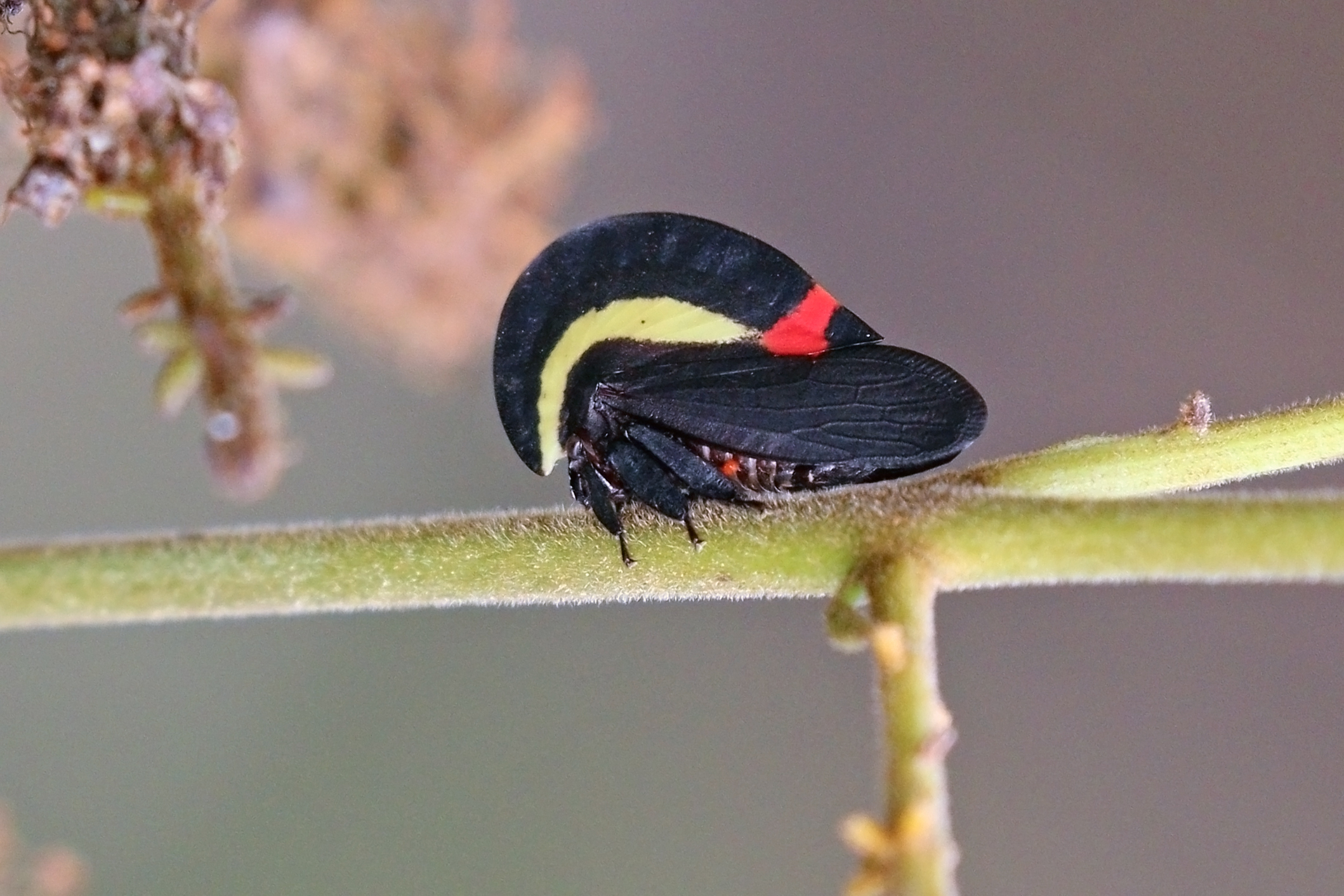

Scientific classification
- Kingdom: Animalia
- Phylum: Arthropoda
- Clade: Pancrustacea
- Class: Insecta
- Order: Hemiptera
- Suborder: Auchenorrhyncha
- Family: Membracidae
- Genus: Membracis
- Species: M. sanguineoplaga

Binomial name
- Membracis sanguineoplaga Schmidt, 1906

Synonyms
- Membracis bucktoni Funkhouser, 1921; Membracis buctoni ^{[sic]} Funkhouser, 1921; Cryptonotus militaris Buckton, 1901; Membracis sanguinoplaga ^{[sic]} Schmidt, 1906; Membracis sanquineoplaga ^{[sic]} Schmidt, 1906

= Membracis sanguineoplaga =

Species of insect

Membracis sanguineoplaga is a species of treehopper.

== Etymology ==
The specific name of Membracis sanguineoplaga means "bloody red" in Latin. The "bloody red" stems from the red spot on its pronotum.

== Description ==
Membracis sanguineoplaga has black wings and a pale yellow stripe streaking through its pronotum.

== Distribution ==
Membracis sanguineoplaga live in South America; in Colombia, Peru, and parts of Brazil.
