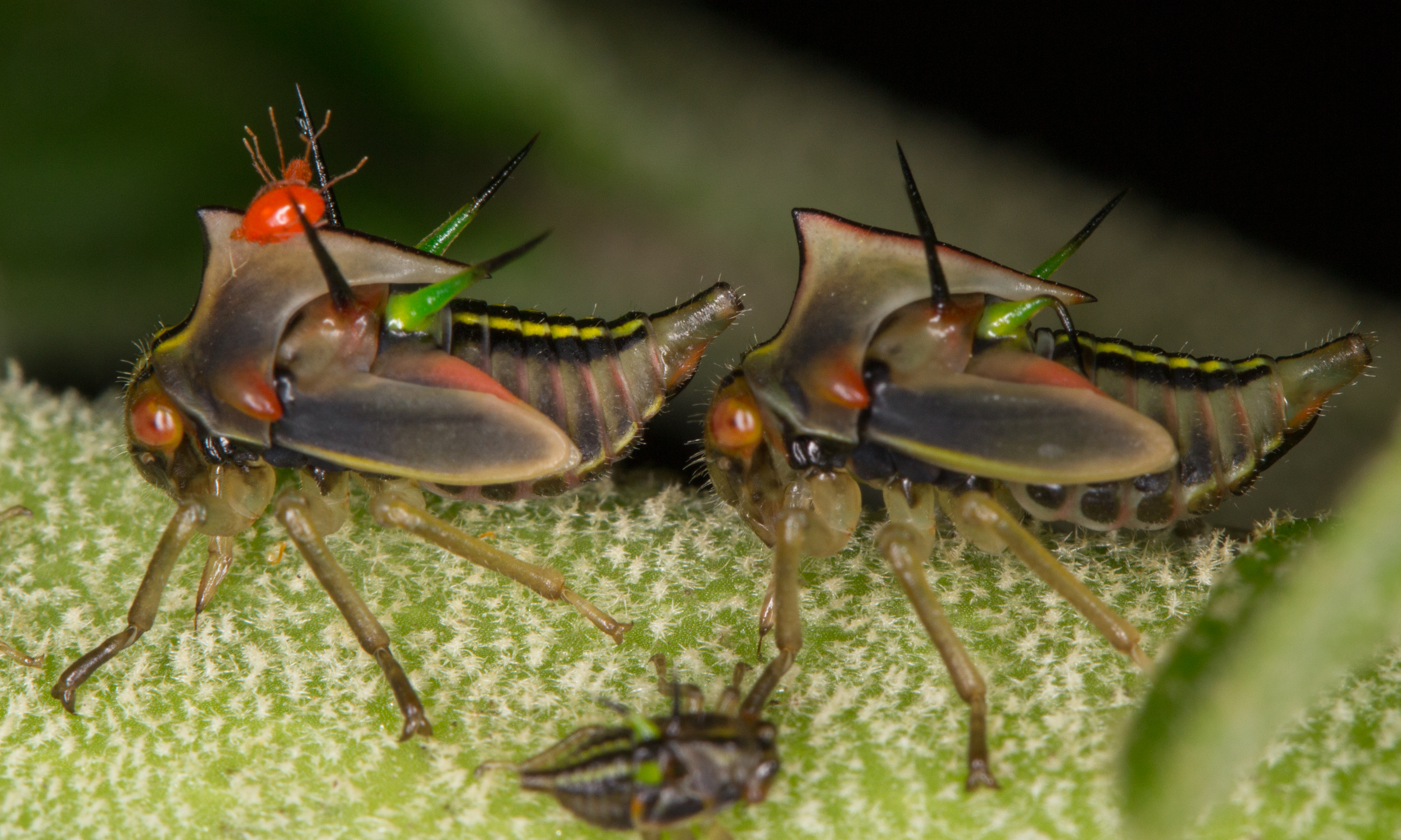

Scientific classification
- Kingdom: Animalia
- Phylum: Arthropoda
- Clade: Pancrustacea
- Class: Insecta
- Order: Hemiptera
- Suborder: Auchenorrhyncha
- Family: Membracidae
- Genus: Alchisme
- Species: A. grossa

Binomial name
- Alchisme grossa (Fairmaire, 1846)

= Alchisme grossa =

Species of treehopper

Alchisme grossa is a species of treehopper. Membracids are defined by their pronotum, which has a variety of functions. Alchisme grossa are a subsocial species found in neotropical South and Central America. They can live on a variety of solanaceous species, such as Brugmansia suaveolens and Solanum ursinum. This species of treehopper was discovered in 1846.

== Morphology ==
Alchisme grossa has a wide and short head with a smooth pronotum, many lacking seta. It can be colored yellow-green. A. grossa shows a prominent pronotum. Its uses include sensorial, crypsis, and protection against predators and parasitoids. Females tend to have a larger pronotum than males, indicating its importance for offspring and egg mass protection. Individuals with a larger pronotum, which correlates to a larger body size, have a greater fitness and can benefit females by driving predators and herbivorous competitors away. Having larger suprahumeral horns could deter predators away by disguising the individual as plant thorns. Individuals observed on the host plant Brugmansia suaveolens, which does not have thorns, were found to have shorter suprahumeral horns.

In A. grossa, nymphs tend to be aposematic and the teneral adults are cryptic. The aposematic appearance of the larvae makes it seem unpalatable to predators. There is an evolutionary link between aposematism and gregariousness, though the exact nature of the link warrants further research.

=== Defense mechanisms ===
Female defense behaviors were identified as predator confrontation and escape. Confrontation behaviors include strong and fast kicking movements, twisting the body and pronotum, or wing fanning and buzzing. Escape behaviors include flying, jumping, or walking away.

The host plant Brugmansia suaveolens contains tropane alkaloids, which have a wide variety of toxicity to insects. Alchisme grossa sequesters the same three tropane alkaloids (3-phenylacetoxy-6,7-epoxytropane, aposcopolamine and scopolamine) of B. suaveolens. Not every species that consumes organic matter with tropane alkaloids sequesters it. The specifics of the purpose sequestering needs further investigation, but it is proposed that it could be a defense mechanism.

== Ecology ==
=== Habitat ===
Alchisme grossa is commonly found in humid montane and submontane ecosystems from north Central America to Northern Chile and the Brazilian shield. It lives on two host plants Brugmansia suaveolens and Solanum ursinum, the latter of which is almost exclusively used in the wet season, while B. suaveolens is utilized the whole year. As adults, the females tend to show a lower dispersal, staying on the same plant on which they were born. Males tend to move in a 20 m (66 ft) radius of the plant on which they were born. Both the life cycle and the mortality differ on each host plant for A. grossa. On B. suaveolens, the life cycle is longer and mortality lower during the dry season. For S. ursinum, the life cycle was observed to be shorter during the wet season. The mortality rates were similar on both host plants during the wet season. The difference of life cycles could be due to the different microenvironments and the chemical makeup of each host plant species. Specifically, the microenvironmental temperature was higher on S. ursinum than B. suaveolens. It is suggested that this could be the result of evolutionary specialization. One study found that treehoppers that develop on B. suaveolens are at greater risk of predation, while individuals on S. ursinum have a greater competition with other herbivorous insects.

=== Diet ===
The diet of A. grossa consists of the host trees that they live on, eating the phloem sap. Some studies suggest they feed on the xylem of woody or herbaceous plants as well. They use a piercing and sucking stylet to feed. Their midgut filer chamber allows for the collection of nutrients. They have a number of predators, include vertebrates, such as lizards, and invertebrates, such as Reduviidae and Coccinellidae insects.

=== Symbiotic relationship ===
Unlike other treehopper species, Alchisme grossa does not exhibit any ant mutualism when it comes to offspring care. The difference of maternal care between A. grossa and other species of the same groups could be related to the changes in altitude where ants are less present.

== Reproduction and development ==
A. grossa has been shown to have moderate level of iteropary, which is unique given that the tribe Hoplophorionini is described as strictly semelparous.

There is not much know about the reproductive biology of A. grossa. Genetic analysis suggests that it reproduces after mating with a single male, however others propose that it mates multiple times, stores sperm, and fertilizes eggs with the sperm of a single male. The eggs are then inserted into the veins of leaves. The larvae go through five instar phases to adulthood.

=== Maternal care ===
A. grossa shows a high level of maternal care among treehopper species, staying with the nymphs from as early as the third larval instar to the fifth larval instar. When two females find themselves proximal to another they can interact. This interaction may allow one of the females to abandon her brood or allow for mixed guarding.

Secondary female presence can be potentially explained using three mechanisms, alloparental care, communal breeding, and intraspecific brood parasitism. The first, alloparental care, is the phenomenon of care of offspring by an individual that is not the parent. Communal breeding allows for both females to increase their fitness by caring for the other's offspring. The brood parasitism mechanism allows the female to minimize the cost of their own maternal care by taking advantage of the other female's care. The secondary female could be attempting to parasitize the other's brood with her own offspring, known as brood parasitism.

Dense groups of egg-guarding female can decrease the risk of parasitism of the egg masses.

Some research proposes that this strategy can also provide benefits for the egg guarding female by the avoidance effect and selfish herd dilution.

Nymphs in this relationship were shown to have different interactions with the egg-guarding female. The unrelated nymphs stayed away from the female and the related nymphs were closer.
