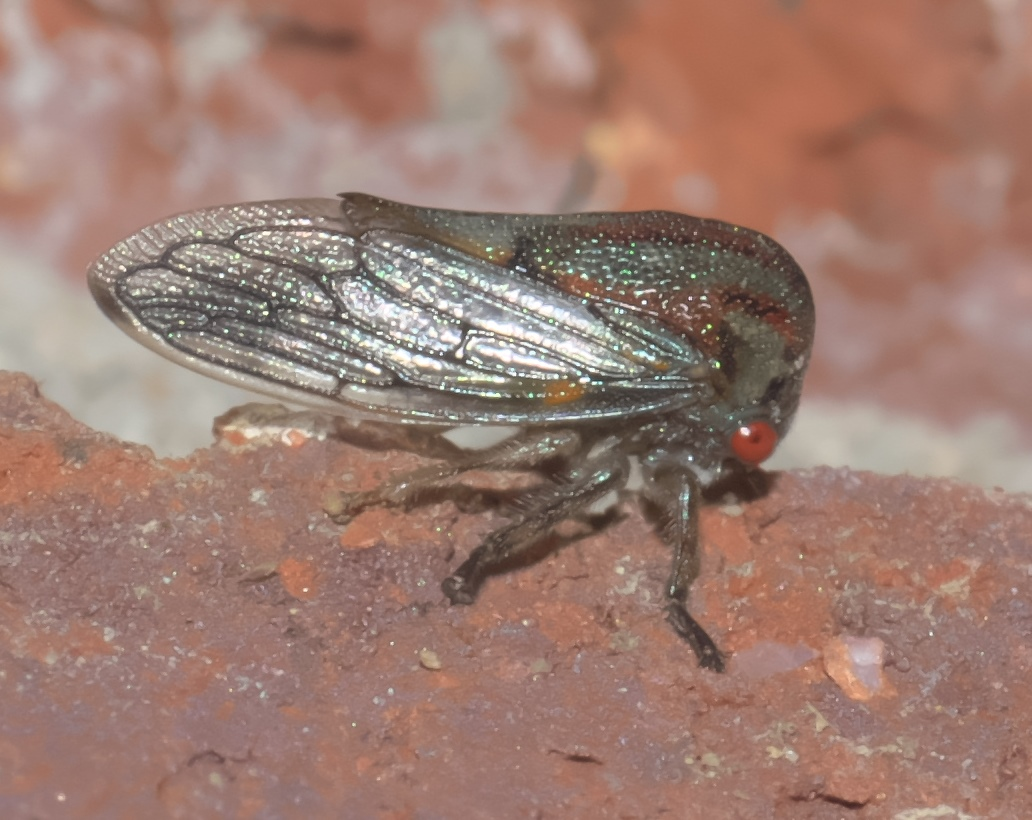
- Platycotis vittata

Scientific classification
- Domain: Eukaryota
- Kingdom: Animalia
- Phylum: Arthropoda
- Class: Insecta
- Order: Hemiptera
- Suborder: Auchenorrhyncha
- Family: Membracidae
- Subfamily: Membracinae
- Tribe: Hoplophorionini
- Genus: Platycotis; Stål, 1869

= Platycotis =

Genus of true bugs

Platycotis is a genus of treehoppers in the family Membracidae. There are about 13 described species in Platycotis.

== Species ==
These 13 species belong to the genus Platycotis:

- Platycotis acutangula Stål, 1869
- Platycotis asodalis Goding
- Platycotis cornuta Plummer, 1936
- Platycotis fuscata Fowler, 1897
- Platycotis histrionica Stål
- Platycotis maritima
- Platycotis minax Goding, 1892
- Platycotis nigrorufa Walker, 1858
- Platycotis salvini Fowler
- Platycotis spreta Goding
- Platycotis tuberculata Fairmaire, 1846
- Platycotis vittata (Fabricius, 1803) (oak treehopper)
