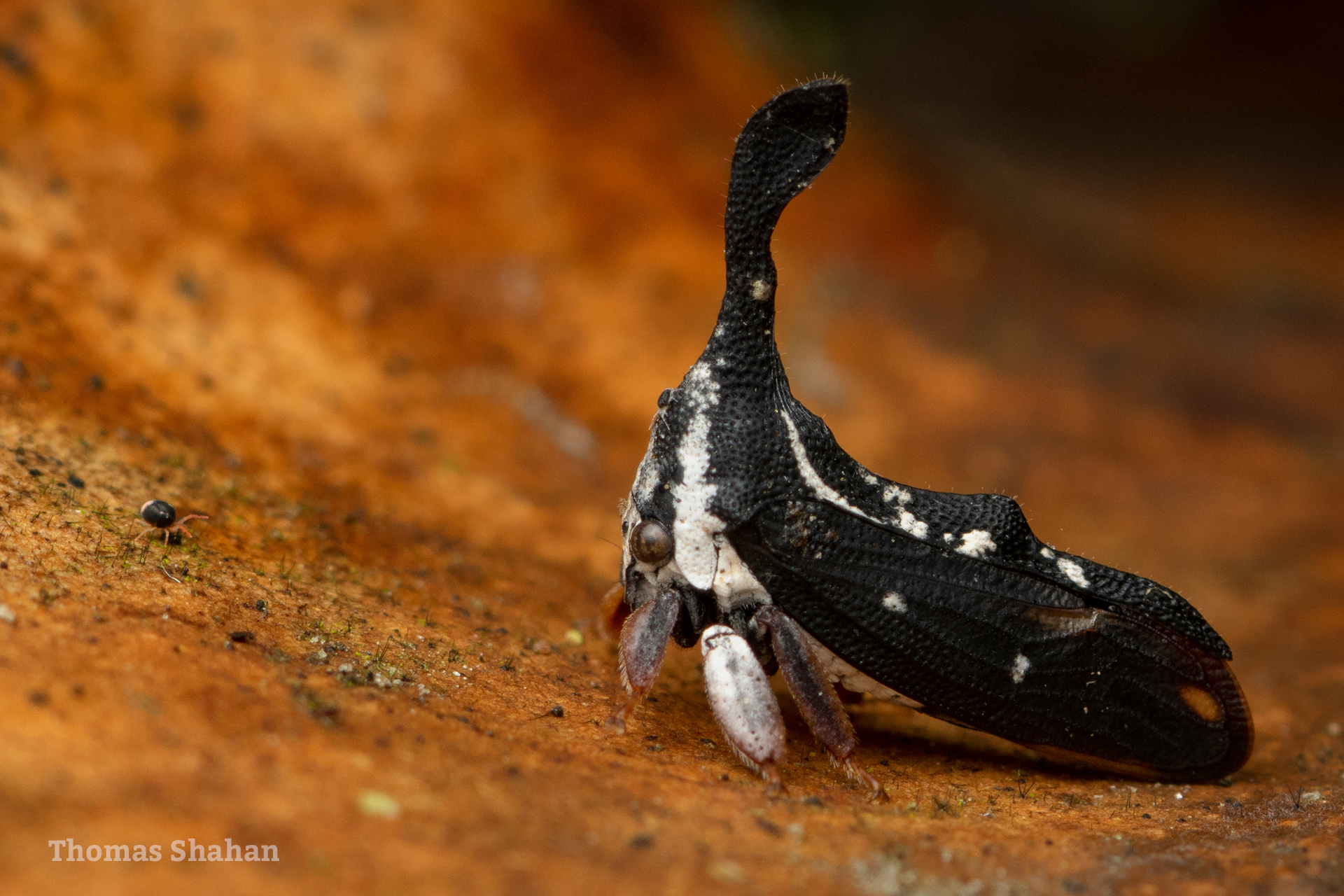

Scientific classification
- Kingdom: Animalia
- Phylum: Arthropoda
- Clade: Pancrustacea
- Class: Insecta
- Order: Hemiptera
- Suborder: Auchenorrhyncha
- Family: Membracidae
- Genus: Cladonota
- Species: C. machinula

Binomial name
- Cladonota machinula (Breddin, 1901)

Synonyms
- Spongophorus machinula Breddin, 1901; Hypsoprora maculata Fonesca and Diringshofen, 1969

= Cladonota machinula =

Species of insect

Cladonota machinula is a species of treehopper within the family Membracidae. The species is found in Ecuador in the province of Pichincha.
