= Cladonota inflata =

Scientific classification
- Kingdom: Animalia
- Phylum: Arthropoda
- Class: Insecta
- Order: Hemiptera
- Suborder: Auchenorrhyncha
- Family: Membracidae
- Genus: Cladonota
- Species: C. inflata

Binomial name
- Cladonota inflata (Fowler, 1894)

Species of insect

Cladonota inflata is a species of treehopper insect.
