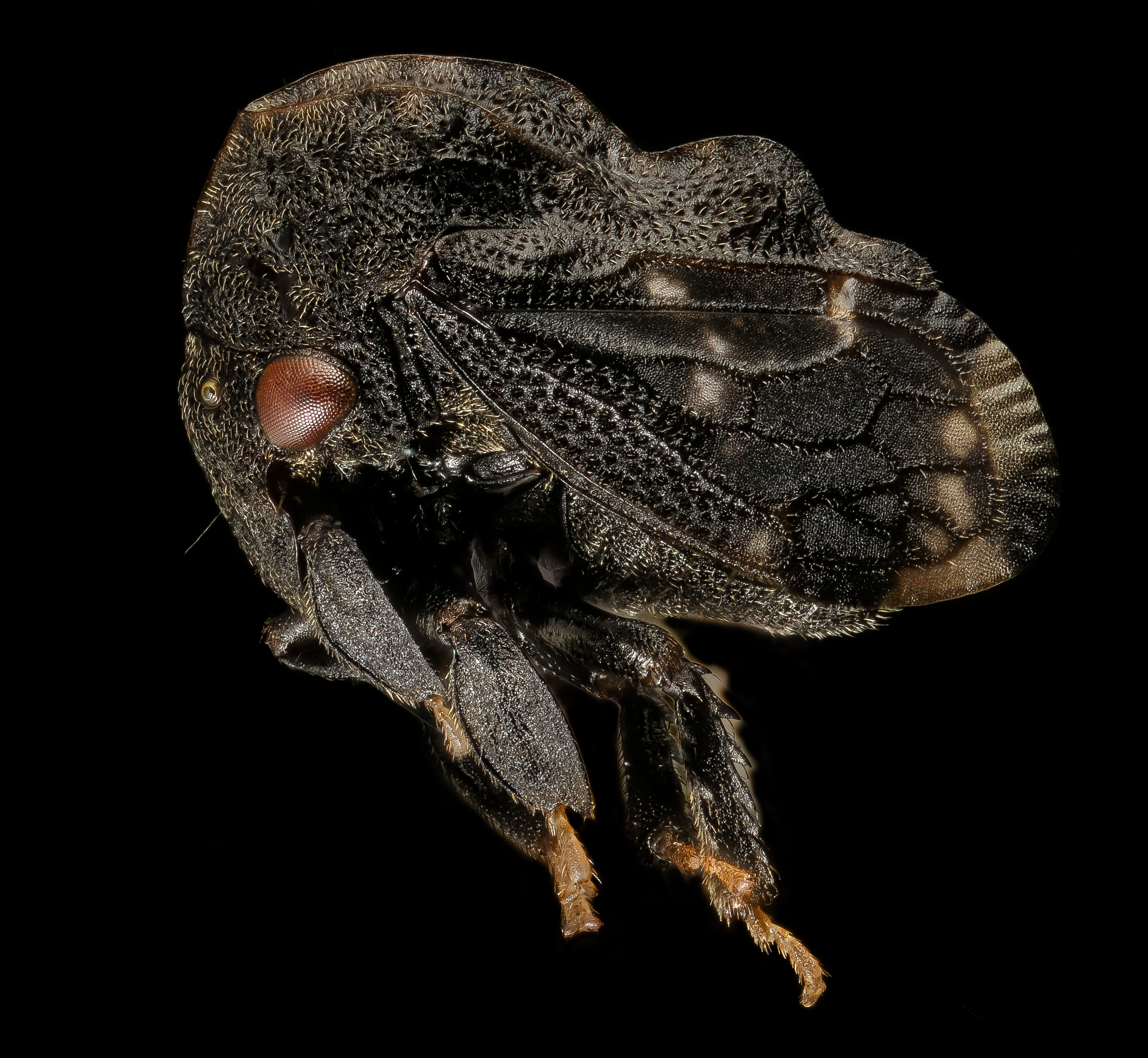
- Tylopelta gibbera

Scientific classification
- Kingdom: Animalia
- Phylum: Arthropoda
- Clade: Pancrustacea
- Class: Insecta
- Order: Hemiptera
- Suborder: Auchenorrhyncha
- Family: Membracidae
- Tribe: Membracini
- Genus: Tylopelta; Fowler, 1894

= Tylopelta =

Genus of treehoppers

Tylopelta is a genus of treehoppers in the family Membracidae. There are at least four described species in Tylopelta.

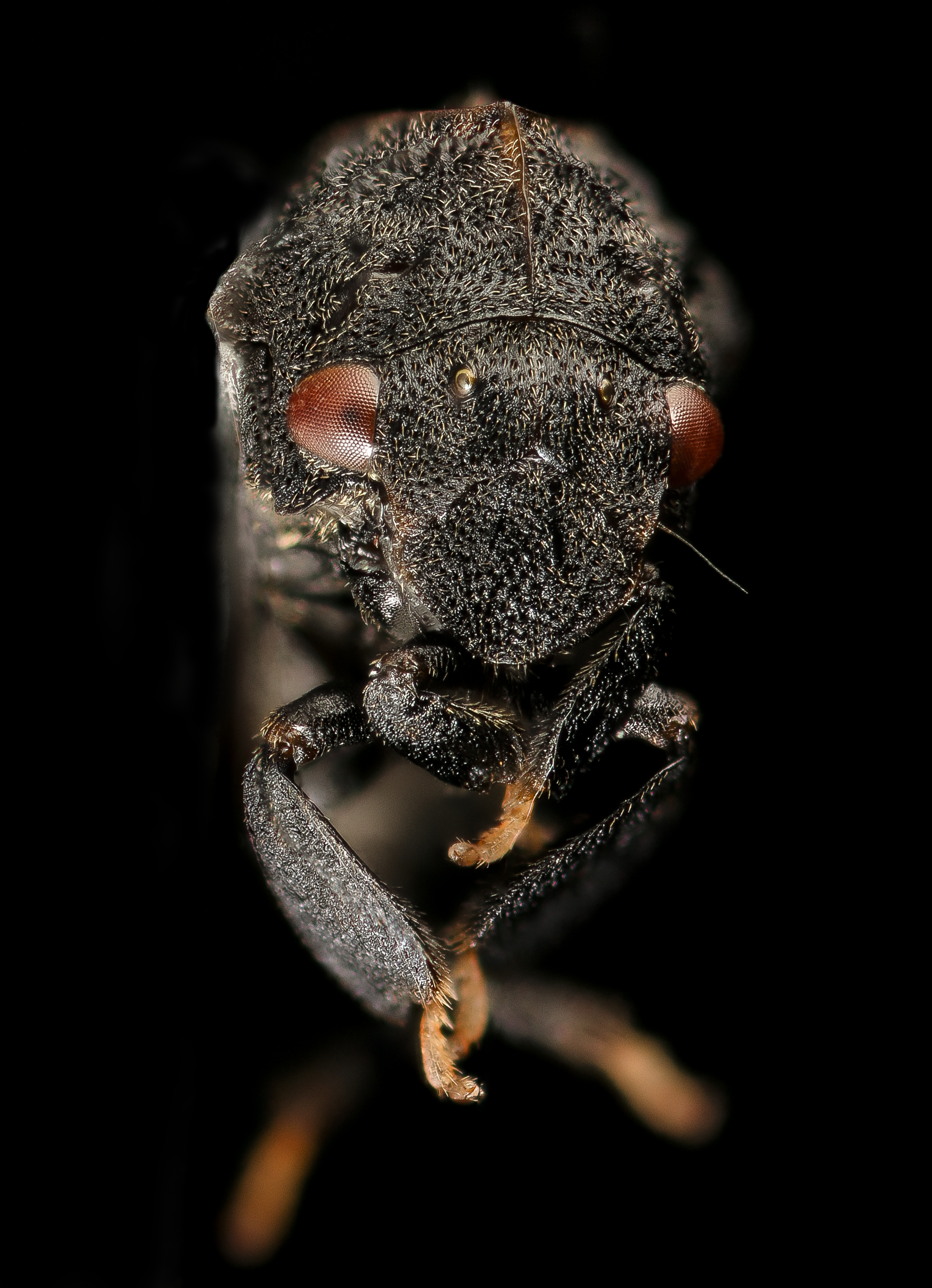
Tylopelta gibbera

== Description ==
Adults within the genus Tylopelta are relatively small treehoppers, typically measuring between 3 and 4 mm in length. They are characterized by a heavy, dark reddish-brown to blackish corrugated pronotum that lacks elongate thorn-like horns but features a pronounced dorsal hump or median carina. This morphology provides efficient camouflage, allowing them to blend closely with the woody twigs of their habitat.

== Ecology and behavior ==
Tylopelta species are sap-feeders, heavily favoring host plants within the beech family (Fagaceae), particularly oaks (Quercus), and the legume family (Fabaceae), such as ticktrefoils (Desmodium spp.). Females deposit eggs into the stems of woody plants, covering them with a protective waxy secretion. Once the nymphs hatch, they form mutualistic relationships with ants, which protect them from predators in exchange for consuming the sugary honeydew excreted by the treehoppers as a digestive byproduct.

While predominantly Neotropical, the range of the genus Tylopelta extends into North America, with documented regional distribution records spanning across the southeastern United States westward into Texas and Arizona.

== Species ==
These four species belong to the genus Tylopelta:

- Tylopelta appendiculata Fonseca^{g}
- Tylopelta gibbera (Stal, 1869)^{c g b}
- Tylopelta monstrosa Fairmaire^{c g}
- Tylopelta obscura Strümpel 1974^{c g}

Data sources: i = ITIS, c = Catalogue of Life, g = GBIF, b = Bugguide.net
