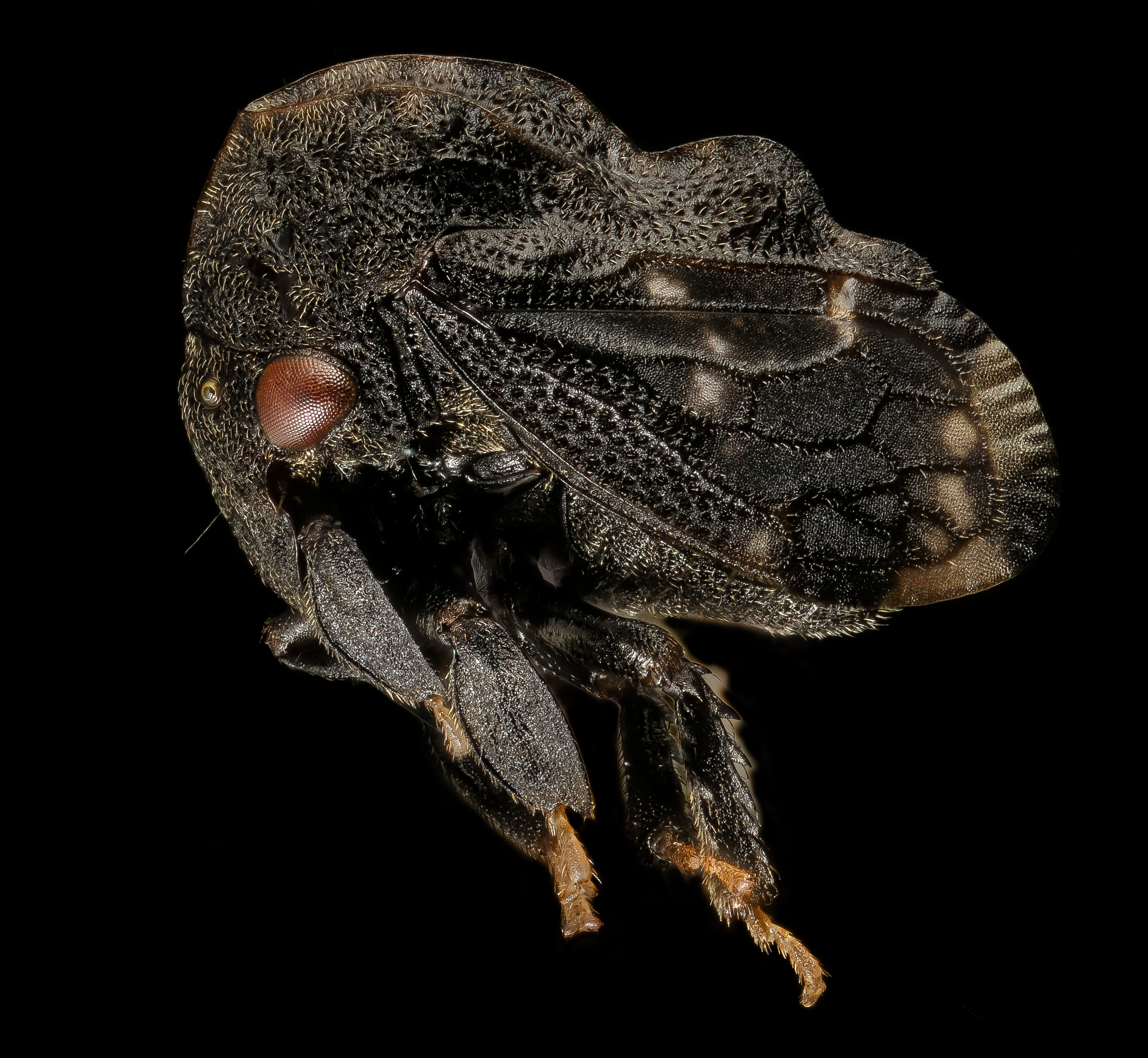

Scientific classification
- Domain: Eukaryota
- Kingdom: Animalia
- Phylum: Arthropoda
- Class: Insecta
- Order: Hemiptera
- Suborder: Auchenorrhyncha
- Family: Membracidae
- Genus: Tylopelta
- Species: T. gibbera

Binomial name
- Tylopelta gibbera (Stal, 1869)

= Tylopelta gibbera =

Species of true bug

Tylopelta gibbera is a species of treehopper in the family Membracidae. This insect has a range which extends from Guatemala into the central United States, although it is occasionally found in Canada. Vibrational communication has been noted in this species, although there is discussion as to what exactly it is being used for.

== Life history ==
Tylopelta gibbera are sap feeders, and can be found on a variety of foliage, including members of Fagaceae (particularly Quercus) and Fabaceae. Females deposit eggs into the stems of woody plants, covering them with a waxy secretion to protect them from predators. Once the nymphs hatch, they are defended by ants who consume the honeydew that they exude as a digestive byproduct.

== Vibrational communication ==
Tylopelta gibbera have been observed using vibrational communication during mating displays. A male will produce a vibrational call that is transmitted through the stem of their host plant. This is done to elicit the response of a receptive female. In cases where there are more than one male, vibrational masking will take place where one male will overlap the call of the other, severely reducing female response rate.

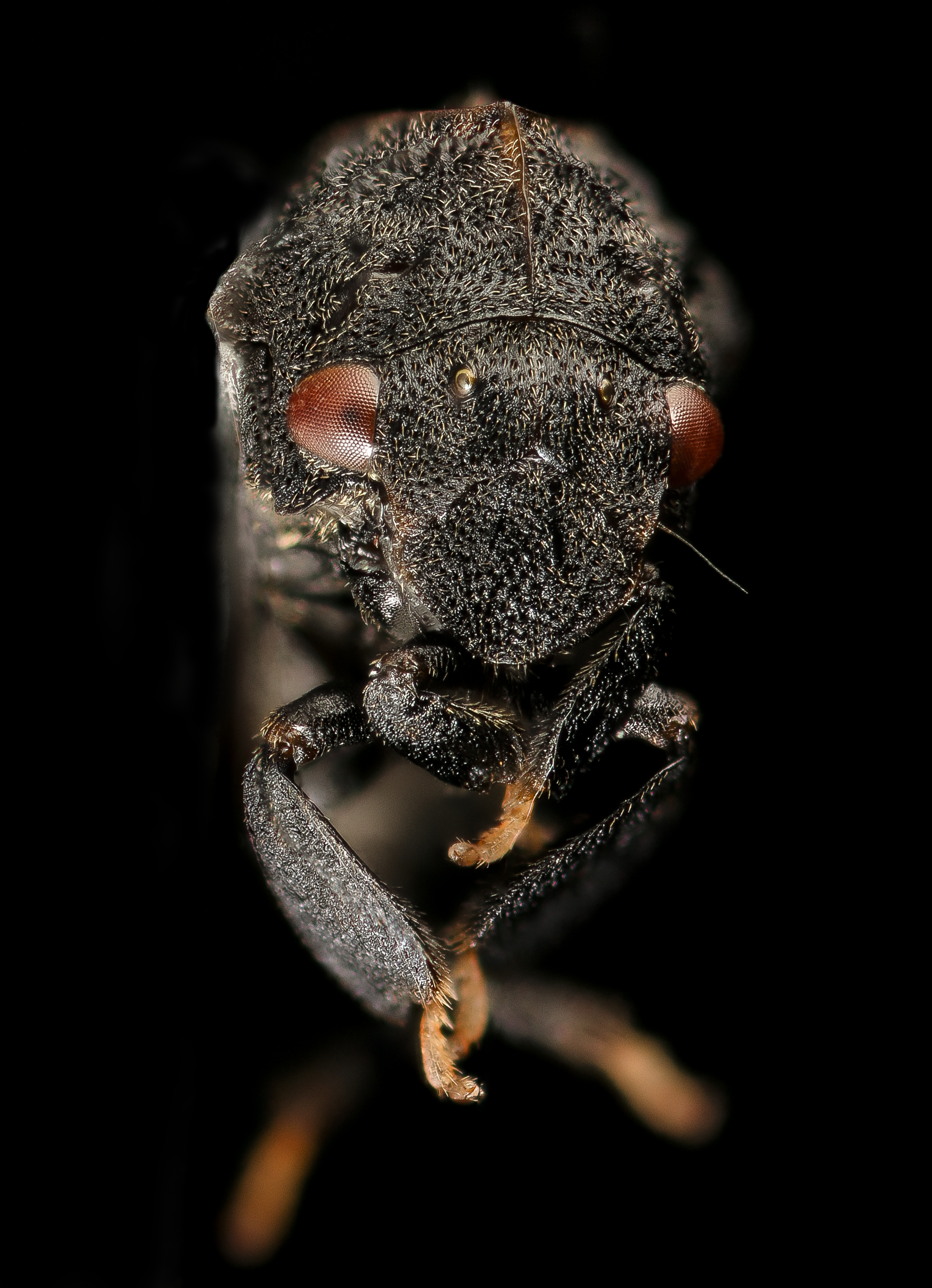
