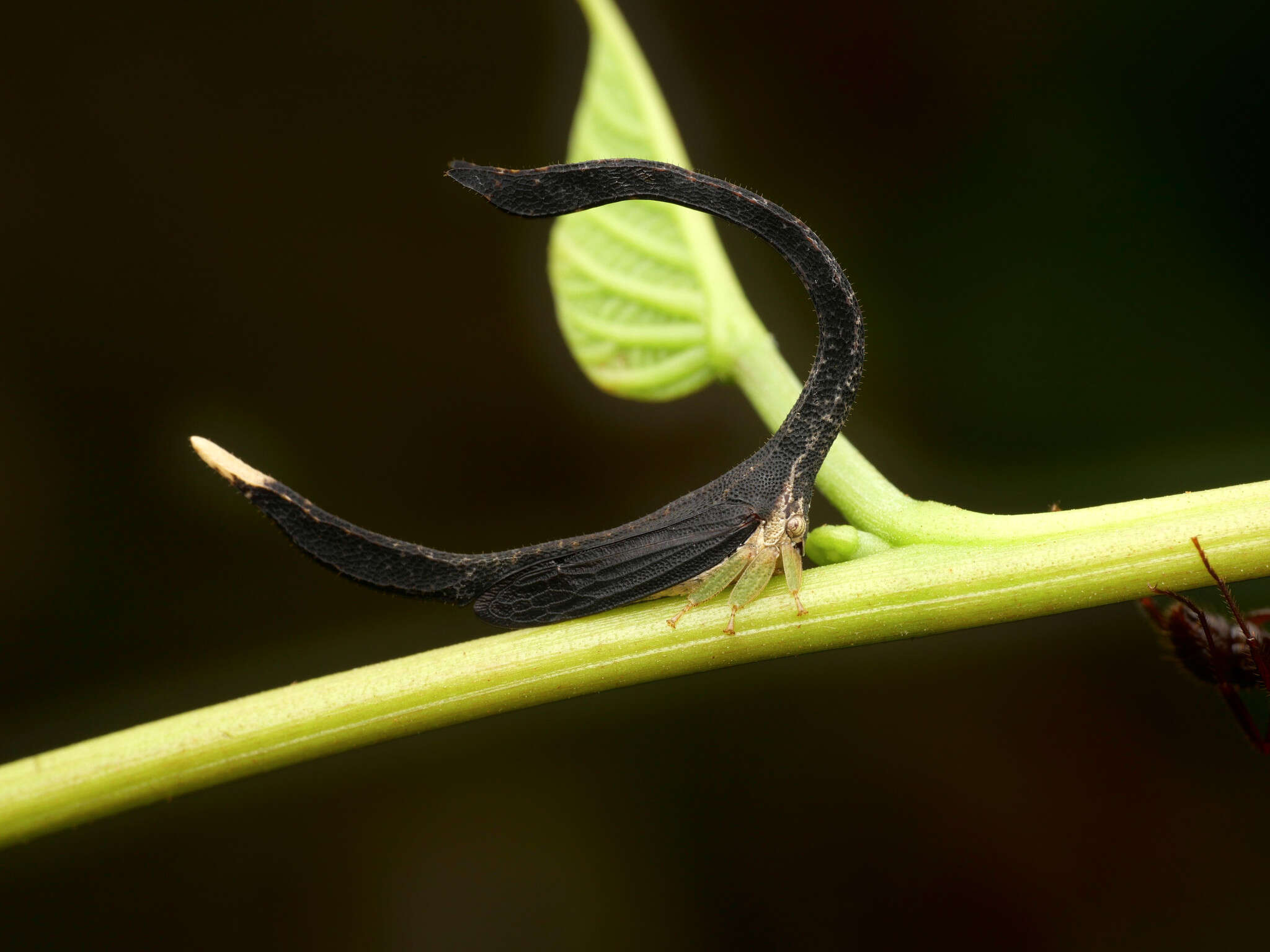

Scientific classification
- Kingdom: Animalia
- Phylum: Arthropoda
- Class: Insecta
- Order: Hemiptera
- Suborder: Auchenorrhyncha
- Family: Membracidae
- Genus: Cladonota
- Species: C. apicalis

Binomial name
- Cladonota apicalis Stål, 1869

= Cladonota apicalis =

Species of insect

Cladonota apicalis is a species of treehopper within the family Membracidae. The species is found distributed in Mexico, Central America, Ecuador, Bolivia, Peru, Venezuela, and Brazil. Individuals typically reach lengths of 6 to 9 millimeters. The species name was likely given after the white mark on the dorsal posterior surface.
