= Microschema =

Scientific classification
- Kingdom: Animalia
- Phylum: Arthropoda
- Clade: Pancrustacea
- Class: Insecta
- Order: Hemiptera
- Suborder: Auchenorrhyncha
- Family: Membracidae
- Genus: Microschema; Stål, 1869
- Species: M. straminicolor

Binomial name
- Microschema straminicolor (Stål, 1862)

Synonyms
- Hoplophora straminicolor Stål, 1862; Platycotis straminicolor (Stål, 1862); Potnia straminicolor (Stål, 1862); Micropepla mourei Sakakibara, 1979; Ochropepla mourei (Sakakibara, 1979)

Genus of true bugs

Microschema is a genus of treehoppers in the family Membracidae, containing the single species Microschema straminicolor.
