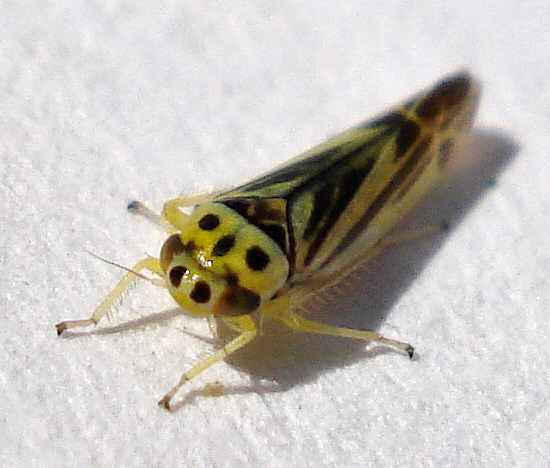
- Eupterycyba jucunda

Scientific classification
- Domain: Eukaryota
- Kingdom: Animalia
- Phylum: Arthropoda
- Class: Insecta
- Order: Hemiptera
- Suborder: Auchenorrhyncha
- Family: Cicadellidae
- Subfamily: Typhlocybinae
- Tribe: Typhlocybini; Kirschbaum, 1868

Genera
- See text

= Typhlocybini =

Tribe of true bugs

Typhlocybini is a leafhopper tribe in the subfamily Typhlocybinae.

== Genera ==
- Agnesiella Dworakowska, 1970
- Aguriahana Distant, 1918
- Ahimia Dworakowska, 1979
- Almunisna Dworakowska, 1969
- Amurta Dworakowska, 1977
- Baaora Dworakowska, 1981
- Bellpenna Chiang, Hsu & Knight, 1989
- Bolanusoides Distant, 1918
- Borulla Dworakowska, Sohi & Viraktamath, 1980
- Byphlocyta Ahmed, 1971
- Caknesia Dworakowska, 1994
- Castoriella Dworakowska, 1974
- Choulima Zhang, 1989
- Columbonirvana Linnavuori, 1959
- Comahadina Huang & Zhang, 2010
- Dapitana Mahmood, 1967
- Dlabolaiana Dworakowska, 1974
- Dworakowskaia Chou & Zhang, 1985
- Edwardsiana Zachvatkin, 1929
- Empoa Fitch, 1851
- Eualebra Baker, 1899
- Eupterella DeLong & Ruppel, 1950
- Eupterycyba Dlabola, 1958
- Eupteryx Curtis, 1829
- Eurhadina Haupt, 1929
- Euzyginella Dietrich, 2013
- Fagocyba Dlabola, 1958
- Farynala Dworakowska, 1970
- Ficocyba Vidano, 1960
- Gratba Dworakowska, 1982
- Guheswaria Thapa, 1983
- Hellerina Dworakowska, 1972
- Henribautia Young & Christian, 1952
- Hiratettix Matsumura, 1931
- Knightipsis Dworakowska, 1969
- Kotwaria Dworakowska, 1984
- Kuantaochia Chiang, Lee & Knight, 1988
- Kuohzygia Zhang, 1990
- Labrangia Dworakowska, 1994
- Lautereriana Dworakowska, 1974
- Ledeira Dworakowska, 1969
- Limassolla Dlabola, 1965
- Limonella Chiang, Hsu & Knight, 1989
- Lindbergina Dlabola, 1958
- Linnavuoriana Dlabola, 1958
- Lowata Dworakowska, 1977
- Mahmoodia Dworakowska, 1970
- Marcelcyba Chiang, Hsu & Knight, 1989
- Mcateeana Christian, 1953
- Meketia Dworakowska, 1982
- Mindanaoa Mahmood, 1967
- Mordania Dworakowska, 1979
- Muluana Dworakowska, 1979
- Narta Dworakowska, 1979
- Ndokia Dworakowska, 1994
- Neozyginella Dietrich, 2013
- Omanesia Thapa, 1983
- Opamata Dworakowska, 1971
- Ossiannilssonola Christian, 1953
- Paracyba Vilbaste, 1968
- Parafagocyba Kuoh & Hu, 1992
- Parallelus Zhang, 1990
- Parathailocyba Zhang, Gao & Huang, 2012
- Paratyphlocyba Ahmed, 1985
- Parazyginella Chou & Zhang, 1985
- Pemoasca Mahmood, 1967
- Platycyba Matsumura, 1932
- Polluxia Dworakowska, 1974
- Pseudhadina Dietrich, 2013
- Pseudozyginella Dietrich, 2013
- Rabiana Mahmood, 1967
- Ramakrishnania Dworakowska, 1974
- Ribautiana Zachvatkin, 1947
- Rotundata Zhang, 1989
- Sacapome Schumacher, 1915
- Sannella Dworakowska, 1982
- Savitara Dworakowska, 1984
- Scinda DeLong & Ruppel, 1951
- Serratulus Mahmood, 1967
- Shamala Dworakowska, 1980
- Sundara Ramakrishnan & Menon, 1972
- Sylhetia Ahmed, 1972
- Tafalka Dworakowska, 1979
- Tahurella Dietrich, 2013
- Takagiana Dworakowska, 1974
- Tataka Dworakowska, 1974
- Thailocyba Mahmood, 1967
- Thampoa Mahmood, 1967
- Tosioma Theron, 1989
- Typhlocyba Germar, 1833
- Vatana Dworakowska, 1994
- Wagneriunia Dworakowska, 1969
- Warodia Dworakowska, 1970
- Wiata Dworakowska, 1972
- Yangida Dworakowska, 1994
- Yangisunda Zhang, 1990
- Yisiona Kuoh, 1981
- Zonocyba Vilbaste, 1982
- Zorka Dworakowska, 1970
- Zyginella Löw, 1885
