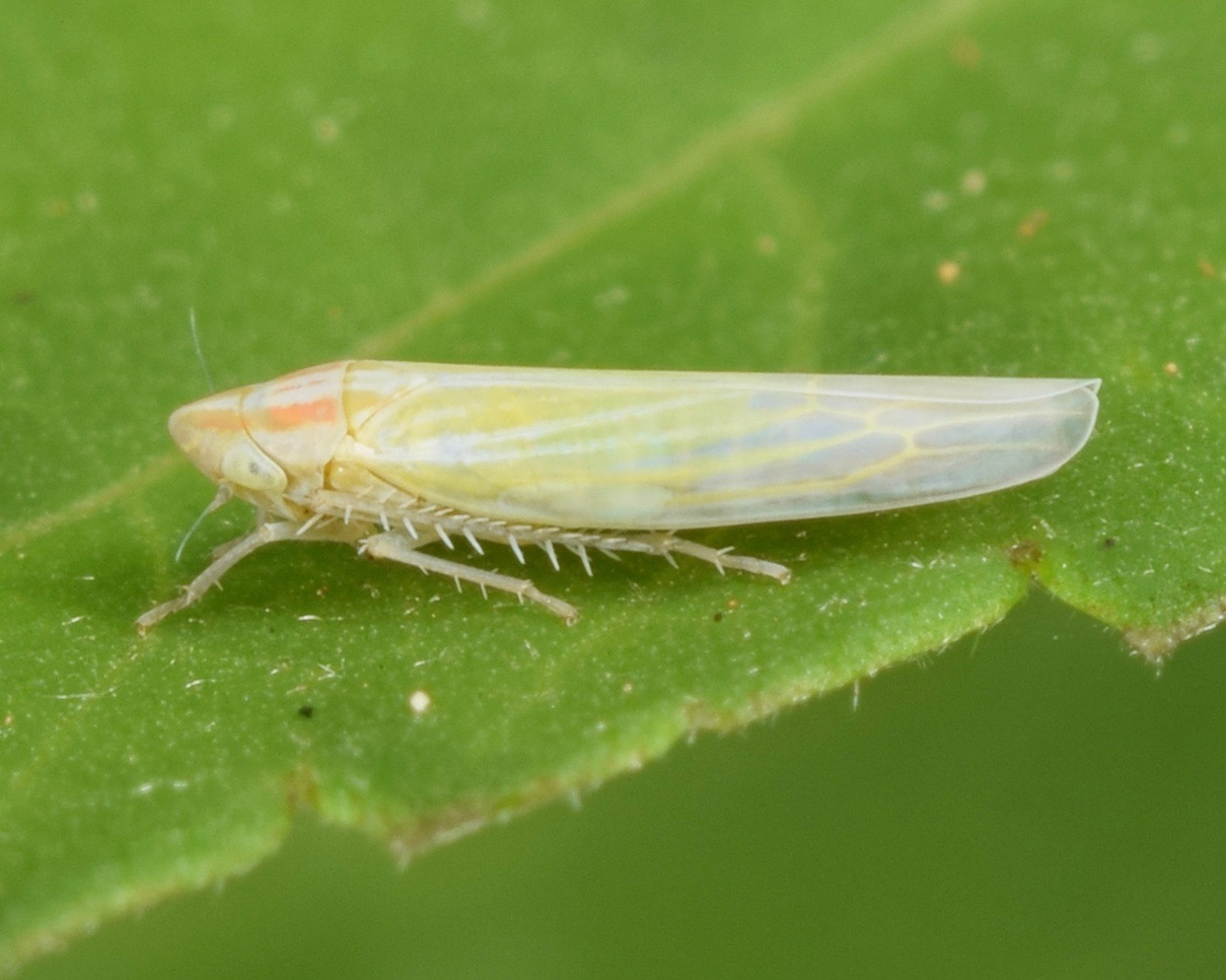
- Dikraneura angustata

Scientific classification
- Kingdom: Animalia
- Phylum: Arthropoda
- Class: Insecta
- Order: Hemiptera
- Suborder: Auchenorrhyncha
- Family: Cicadellidae
- Subfamily: Typhlocybinae
- Tribe: Dikraneurini

Genera
- See text

= Dikraneurini =

Tribe of leafhoppers

Dikraneurini is a leafhopper tribe in the subfamily Typhlocybinae.

== Genera ==
- Afrakeura
- Afrakra
- Alconeura
- Anaka
- Aneono
- Aroonra
- Aruena
- Ayubiana
- Britimnathista
- Buritia
- Cuanta
- Dicraneurula
- Dikraneura
- Dikrella
- Dikrellidia
- Donidea
- Dziwneono
- Emelyanoviana
- Endoxoneura
- Erythria
- Flatseta
- Forcipata
- Fusiplata
- Golwala
- Gullifera
- Hazaraneura
- Hybla
- Idona
- Igutettix
- Iniesta
- Jimara
- Kahaono
- Kalkiana
- Kamaza
- Karachiota
- Kerygma
- Kidraneuroidea
- Kidrella
- Kirkaldykra
- Kunzeana
- Kunzella
- Liguropia
- Micantulina
- Michalowskiya
- Motschulskyia
- Naratettix
- Neodikrella
- Notus
- Parallaxis
- Platfusa
- Ramsisia
- Riyavaroa
- Saranella
- Sarascarta
- Smita
- Sweta
- Takagioma
- Togaricrania
- Typhlocybella
- Urvana
- Uzeldikra
- Vikabara
- Wagneriala
- Youngszella
- Zielona
