= Dayus (leafhopper) =

Scientific classification
- Kingdom: Animalia
- Phylum: Arthropoda
- Clade: Pancrustacea
- Class: Insecta
- Order: Hemiptera
- Suborder: Auchenorrhyncha
- Family: Cicadellidae
- Subfamily: Typhlocybinae
- Tribe: Empoascini
- Subtribe: Empoascina
- Genus: Dayus; Mahmood, 1967

Species
- See text

Genus of true bugs

Dayus is a genus of leafhoppers that belongs to the subfamily Typhlocybinae. Species belonging to this genus are distributed across the Indomalayan realm including China, Taiwan, Japan, Thailand, Australia, Fiji and Samoa.

== Taxonomy ==
The genus was established in 1967 by Mahmood with Dayus elongatus from Singapore. Subsequently in 1971, Dworakowska, a polish entomologist, would describe Dayus takagii from Japan and transferred Dayus upoluanus from Western Samoa and Dayus euryphaessus from Australia and Fiji to this genus. Then in 1978, Dworakowska and Viraktamath, an Indian entomologist, would describe Dayus formosus. Qin and Zhang (2007) would describe three new species from China, they are: Dayus lii, Dayus membranaceus, and Dayus lamellatus. In 2013, Yu and Yang would describe three new species from China: Dayus bifurcatus, Dayus trifurcatus and Dayus serratus. Dayus furcatus was described in 2021.

=== Species ===
This genus contains 12 described species. They are listed below:

- Dayus bifurcatus Yu and Yang, 2013- China
- Dayus elongatus Mahmood, 1967- Singapore (Type species)
- Dayus euryphaessa (Kirkaldy, 1907) - Australia and Fiji
- Dayus formosus Dworakowska and Viraktamath, 1978 - Taiwan
- Dayus furcatus Xu et al, 2021a- Thailand
- Dayus lamellatus Qin & Zhang, 2007- China
- Dayus lii Qin & Zhang, 2007- China
- Dayus membranaceus Qin & Zhang, 2007- China
- Dayus serratus Yu and Yang, 2013- China
- Dayus takagii Dworakowska, 1971- Japan
- Dayus trifurcatus Yu and Yang, 2013- China
- Dayus upoluanus Dworakowska, 1971 Western Samoa
