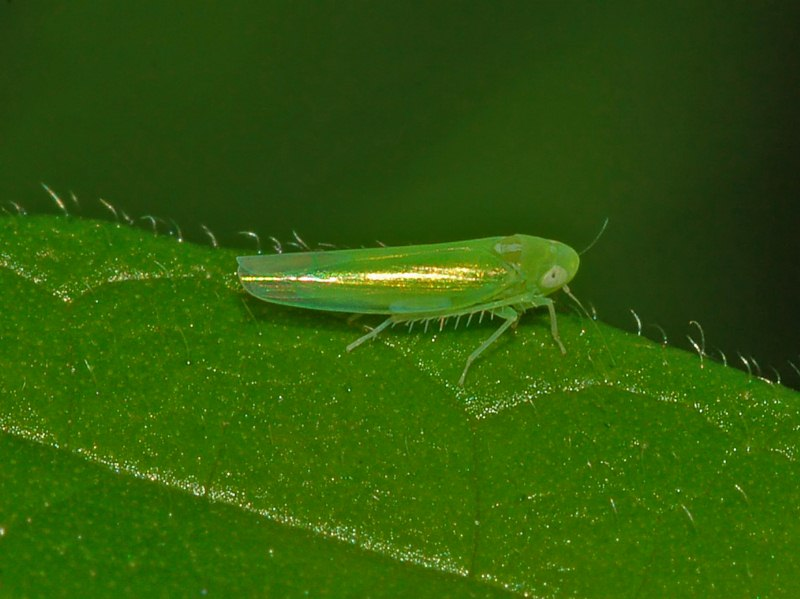
- Empoasca cf. decipiens

Scientific classification
- Kingdom: Animalia
- Phylum: Arthropoda
- Class: Insecta
- Order: Hemiptera
- Suborder: Auchenorrhyncha
- Family: Cicadellidae
- Subfamily: Typhlocybinae
- Tribe: Empoascini; Distant, 1908

= Empoascini =

Tribe of leafhoppers

Empoascini is a tribe of leafhoppers in the subfamily Typhlocybinae.

== Genera ==
The following genera are members of the tribe Empoascini:

- Afrasca Dworakowska & Lauterer, 1975
- Afroccidens Ghauri, 1969
- Alafrasca Lu & Qin, 2014
- Alebrasca Hayashi & Okada, 1994
- Alebroides Matsumura, 1931
- Amrasca Ghauri, 1967
- Apheliona Kirkaldy, 1907
- Asepodiva Dworakowska, 1994
- Asymmetrasca Dlabola, 1958
- Austroasca Lower, 1952
- Badylessa Dworakowska, 1981
- Baguoidea Mahmood, 1967
- Bifurcus Xu, Dietrich & Qin, 2022
- Buhria Dworakowska, 1976
- Chlorita Fieber, 1872
- Chloroasca Anufriev, 1972
- Circinans Qin & Lu, 2014
- Coccineasca Xu, Dietrich & Qin, 2021
- Concaviasca Xu, Dietrich & Qin, 2021
- Condensella Xu, Dietrich & Qin, 2017
- Daluana Ramakrishnan, 1982
- Dapitana Mahmood, 1967
- Dattasca Dworakowska, 1979
- Dayus Mahmood, 1967
- Dialecticopteryx Kirkaldy, 1907
- Distantasca Dworakowska, 1972
- Dunioa Dworakowska, 1995
- Empoasca Walsh, 1862
- Endogena Xu, Dietrich & Qin, 2017
- Epignoma Dworakowska, 1972
- Faiga Dworakowska, 1980
- Fanjinga Yu & Yang, 2020
- Ficiana Ghauri, 1964
- Flaviata Lu & Qin, 2014
- Ghauriana Thapa, 1985
- Goifa Dworakowska, 1977
- Greceasca Thapa, 1985
- Habenia Dworakowska, 1972
- Hebata DeLong, 1931
- Heliona Melichar, 1903
- Helionides Matsumura, 1931
- Homa Distant, 1908
- Ifuaria Dworakowska, 1994
- Ifugoa Dworakowska & Pawar, 1974
- Inflatopina Lu, Dietrich & Qin, 2017
- Ishiharella Dworakowska, 1970
- Ivmaka Xu & Dietrich, 2023
- Jacobiasca Dworakowska, 1972
- Jacobiella Dworakowska, 1972
- Joruma McAtee, 1924
- Kaila Dworakowska, 1974
- Keumiata Qin & Dietrich, 2014
- Krameriata Dworakowska, 1977
- Kufajka Dworakowska, 1995
- Kyboasca Dlabola, 1958
- Kybos Fieber, 1866
- Lankasca Ghauri, 1964
- Lipata Dworakowska, 1974
- Livasca Dworakowska & Viraktamath, 1978
- Longibrachiasca Xu, Dietrich & Qin, 2021
- Lumicella Lu & Qin, 2013
- Luodianasca Qin & Zhang, 2008
- Luvila Dworakowska, 1974
- Mahmoodia Dworakowska, 1970
- Marolda Dworakowska, 1977
- Matatua Knight, 1976
- Matsumurama Thapa, 1989
- Matsumurasca Anufriev, 1973
- Membranacea Qin & Zhang, 2011
- Mindanaoa Mahmood, 1967
- Mjolnirus Wang, Xu & Qin, 2021
- Neojoruma Young, 1952
- Nikkotettix Matsumura, 1931
- Nimabanana Dworakowska, 1994
- Nulliata Lu, Xu & Qin, 2017
- Ociepa Dworakowska, 1977
- Okubasca Dworakowska, 1982
- Optya Dworakowska, 1974
- Pemoasca Mahmood, 1967
- Pitadava Dworakowska, 1995
- Pradama Dworakowska, 1995
- Rabiana Mahmood, 1967
- Radicafurcus Qin & Zhang, 2010
- Randhawa Dworakowska, 1995
- Rawania Ghauri, 1964
- Rubiparvus Xu, Dietrich & Qin, 2016
- Sabourasca Ramakrishnan & Menon, 1972
- Schizandrasca Anufriev, 1972
- Serratulus Mahmood, 1967
- Shumka Dworakowska, 1997
- Singulusa Yao & Yu, 2025
- Smyga Dworakowska, 1995
- Speciosiaca Xu, Dietrich & Qin, 2021
- Szara Dworakowska, 1995
- Szuletaia Dworakowska, 1995
- Thaioasca Wang, Xu & Qin, 2021
- Theasca Dworakowska, 1972
- Treufalka Qin & Zhang, 2008
- Tripunctiasca Xu, Dietrich & Qin, 2021
- Unitra Dworakowska, 1974
- Usharia Dworakowska, 1977
- Varsha Dworakowska, 1995
- Velu Ghauri, 1964
- Ventriappendix Ding, Yu & Yang, 2024
- Wemba Dworakowska, 1974
- Wolvletta Dworakowska, 1995
- Yunicella Suo, Dietrich & Qin, 2016
- Znana Dworakowska, 1994
