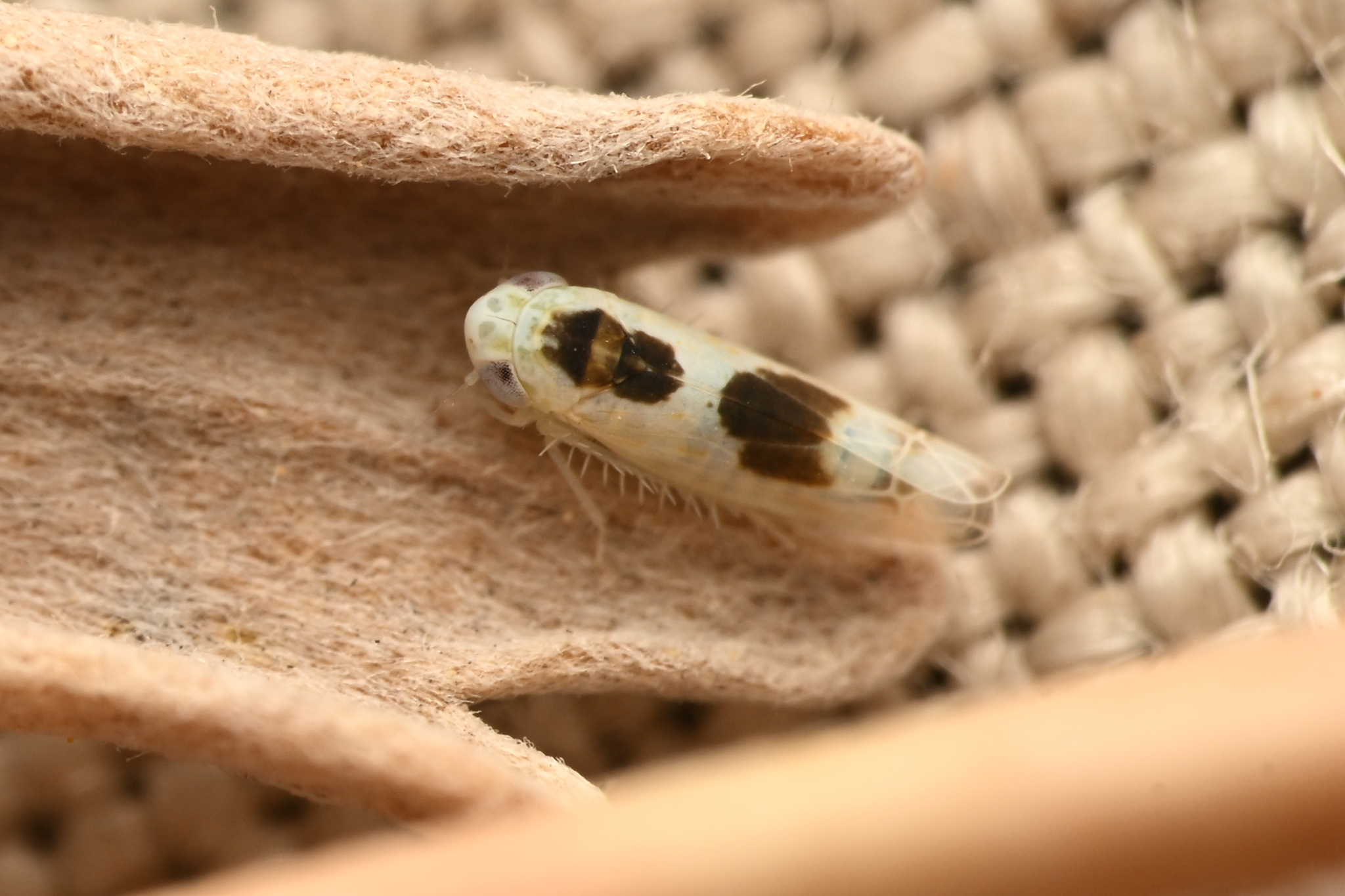
- Hebata nigra, California

Scientific classification
- Kingdom: Animalia
- Phylum: Arthropoda
- Clade: Pancrustacea
- Class: Insecta
- Order: Hemiptera
- Suborder: Auchenorrhyncha
- Family: Cicadellidae
- Subfamily: Typhlocybinae
- Tribe: Empoascini
- Subtribe: Empoascina
- Genus: Hebata; DeLong, 1931

Subgenera
- Alboneurasca Xu, Dietrich & Qin, 2021; Hebata DeLong, 1931; Setigeriasca Xu, Dietrich & Qin, 2021; Signatasca Xu, Dietrich & Qin, 2021

= Hebata =

Genus of leafhoppers

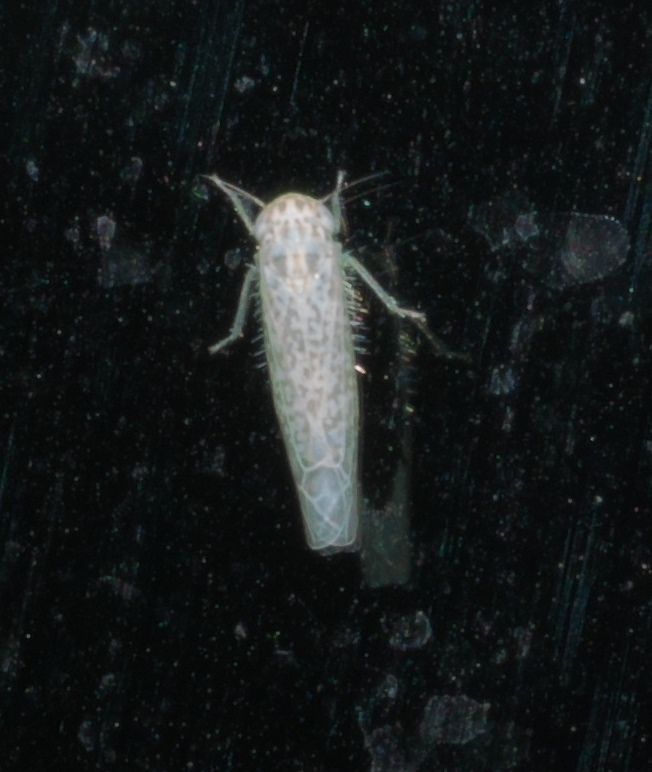
Hebata, aspersa species group, California

Hebata is a genus of leafhoppers in the family Cicadellidae. There are at least 280 described species in Hebata, found mainly in the Americas, Europe, and Asia.

== Species ==
These 280 species belong to the genus Hebata:

- Hebata abaroensis (Heller & Linnavuori, 1968)
- Hebata abbreviata (DeLong, 1931)
- Hebata abietis (Matsumura, 1916)
- Hebata abrupta (DeLong, 1931)
- Hebata acantha (Davidson & DeLong, 1943)
- Hebata acanthafera (Southern & Dietrich, 2010)
- Hebata acuminata (Wheeler, 1939)
- Hebata adexa (Davidson & DeLong, 1943)
- Hebata aequatorialis (Paoli, 1936)
- Hebata affinipeba (Southern & Dietrich, 2010)
- Hebata affinis (Nast, 1937)
- Hebata alboneura (Gillette, 1898)
- Hebata albonota (DeLong, 1931)
- Hebata alboscripta (Van Duzee, 1914)
- Hebata alinka (Dworakowska, 1981)
- Hebata allera (DeLong & Liles, 1956)
- Hebata alsiosa (Ribaut, 1933)
- Hebata altaica (Vilbaste, 1965)
- Hebata amara (Davidson & DeLong, 1939)
- Hebata amasa (Dworakowska, 1984)
- Hebata amblacantha (Oman & Wheeler, 1938)
- Hebata amurensis (Anufriev, 1970)
- Hebata ancistra (Davidson & DeLong, 1939)
- Hebata anguina (Dworakowska, 1972)
- Hebata angustella (DeLong, 1952)
- Hebata anicar (DeLong & Guevara, 1954)
- Hebata anoteya (DeLong & Guevara, 1954)
- Hebata apatapeba (Southern & Dietrich, 2010)
- Hebata apibicruris (Liu, 2011)
- Hebata apicalis (Flor, 1861)
- Hebata apodema (Ahmed, Samad & Naheed, 1981)
- Hebata appendiculata (Ara & Ahmed, 1988)
- Hebata aracoma (DeLong & Guevara, 1954)
- Hebata ariadnae (Dworakowska, 1971)
- Hebata arida (DeLong, 1931)
- Hebata arqua (Davidson & DeLong, 1942)
- Hebata arta (DeLong & Davidson, 1935)
- Hebata aspersa (Gillette & Baker, 1895)
- Hebata asymmetra (Dworakowska, 1972)
- Hebata awa (Dworakowska, 1977)
- Hebata azteca (González, 1955)
- Hebata betuleti (Vilbaste, 1965)
- Hebata bicorna (DeLong & Caldwell, 1934)
- Hebata bicuspida (Davidson & DeLong, 1938)
- Hebata bidens (DeLong, 1932)
- Hebata bifurcata (DeLong, 1931)
- Hebata bitubera (DeLong, 1932)
- Hebata blaba (Langlitz, 1964)
- Hebata blendens (DeLong, 1952)
- Hebata bostanensis (Ahmed, Samad & Naheed, 1981)
- Hebata bulba (Davidson & DeLong, 1943)
- Hebata calcea (DeLong, 1932)
- Hebata calyxa (Oman & Wheeler, 1938)
- Hebata capsicae (Ahmed, Samad & Naheed, 1981)
- Hebata caraba (Davidson & DeLong, 1943)
- Hebata caverna (Davidson & DeLong, 1938)
- Hebata cerata (Davidson & DeLong, 1943)
- Hebata cerea (DeLong, 1931)
- Hebata clematidis (Mitjaev, 1971)
- Hebata cokorata (Sohi & Dworakowska, 1986)
- Hebata comara (DeLong & Guevara, 1954)
- Hebata cona (Dworakowska, 1981)
- Hebata congrua (Heller & Linnavuori, 1968)
- Hebata consimilis (Logvinenko, 1980)
- Hebata corella (DeLong & Guevara, 1954)
- Hebata cothurna (Davidson & DeLong, 1943)
- Hebata crepidula (Wheeler, 1939)
- Hebata crocostigmata (Davidson & DeLong, 1942)
- Hebata crocovittata (Davidson & DeLong, 1942)
- Hebata cruciata (DeLong, 1952)
- Hebata curvata (Poos, 1933)
- Hebata curvatura (Davidson & DeLong, 1938)
- Hebata curvexa (Davidson & DeLong, 1939)
- Hebata cyamopsae (Naheed & Ahmed, 1980)
- Hebata dactylata (Davidson & DeLong, 1942)
- Hebata dahaopingensis (Qin & Liu, 2011)
- Hebata davidsoni (DeLong, 1945)
- Hebata dealbata (Cerutti, 1939)
- Hebata decipiens (Paoli, 1930)
- Hebata decora (DeLong & Davidson, 1935)
- Hebata decurvata (Davidson & DeLong, 1938)
- Hebata delongi (Poos, 1933)
- Hebata delta (Wheeler, 1939)
- Hebata denaria (Van Duzee, 1930)
- Hebata dendritica (Qin & Liu, 2011)
- Hebata dentata (DeLong & Davidson, 1935)
- Hebata deskina (DeLong & Guevara, 1954)
- Hebata diacumanis (Davidson & DeLong, 1943)
- Hebata dichotomous (Zhang & Xiao, 2000)
- Hebata difficilis (González, 1955)
- Hebata distinguenda (Paoli, 1932)
- Hebata distracta (DeLong & Caldwell, 1934)
- Hebata ditata (DeLong & Caldwell, 1934)
- Hebata diverta (DeLong & Davidson, 1935)
- Hebata dorsovitta (DeLong, 1952)
- Hebata dymarka (Dworakowska, 1984)
- Hebata eldadi (Ahmed, 1979)
- Hebata emeljanovi (Anufriev, 1973)
- Hebata ensiformis (Oman & Wheeler, 1938)
- Hebata erigeron (DeLong, 1931)
- Hebata erythrocephala (Wheeler, 1939)
- Hebata esuma (Goding, 1890)
- Hebata etroni (Dworakowska, 1976)
- Hebata fabalis (DeLong, 1930)
- Hebata falca (DeLong & Davidson, 1935)
- Hebata filamenta (DeLong, 1931)
- Hebata fissurata (Dworakowska, 1968)
- Hebata flavovittella (Matsumura, 1931)
- Hebata fletcheri (Dworakowska, 1984)
- Hebata formidolosa (Dworakowska, 1981)
- Hebata furcata (Vilbaste, 1968)
- Hebata fuscoviridis (Oman & Wheeler, 1938)
- Hebata galluxa (Davidson & DeLong, 1939)
- Hebata georgii (Dworakowska, 1976)
- Hebata guevarai (González, 1955)
- Hebata gutianensis (Zhang & Liu, 2011)
- Hebata halaensis (Naheed & Ahmed, 1980)
- Hebata hama (DeLong & Caldwell, 1934)
- Hebata hamata (DeLong, 1931)
- Hebata hamiltoni (Dworakowska, 1977)
- Hebata hankaensis (Vilbaste, 1966)
- Hebata hecta (Davidson & DeLong, 1939)
- Hebata hiromichii (Matsumura, 1931)
- Hebata imbongae (Dworakowska, 1977)
- Hebata indenta (Oman & Wheeler, 1938)
- Hebata ingena (Davidson & DeLong, 1942)
- Hebata irrita (Davidson & DeLong, 1943)
- Hebata ishiharai (Anufriev, 1973)
- Hebata jalapa (DeLong, 1952)
- Hebata jigongshana (Cai & Shen, 1999)
- Hebata juchani (Anufriev, 1973)
- Hebata junipera (DeLong, 1931)
- Hebata juniperina (Linnavuori, 1965)
- Hebata kaibaba (Davidson & DeLong, 1939)
- Hebata karatavica (Mitjaev, 1971)
- Hebata kerri (Singh-Pruthi, 1940)
- Hebata khaliquei (Ahmed, Samad & Naheed, 1981)
- Hebata knudseni (Dworakowska, 1973)
- Hebata knulli (Davidson & DeLong, 1939)
- Hebata kontkaneni (Ossiannilsson, 1949)
- Hebata kudlata (Dworakowska, 1981)
- Hebata kulka (Dworakowska, 1977)
- Hebata lata (DeLong & Caldwell, 1934)
- Hebata latarca (Davidson & DeLong, 1938)
- Hebata lautereri (Mitjaev, 1980)
- Hebata lillae (Dworakowska, 1980)
- Hebata limbifera (Matsumura, 1931)
- Hebata lipcowa (Dworakowska, 1982)
- Hebata livara (Dworakowska & Sohi, 1978)
- Hebata longispina (Oman, 1936)
- Hebata lulupa (Dworakowska, 1977)
- Hebata madra (Davidson & DeLong, 1939)
- Hebata majowa (Dworakowska, 1972)
- Hebata mardanensis (Ahmed, Samad & Naheed, 1981)
- Hebata masoodi (Naheed & Ahmed, 1980)
- Hebata matsudai (Dworakowska, 1972)
- Hebata medora (DeLong, 1932)
- Hebata megalophylla (Qin & Liu, 2011)
- Hebata metana (DeLong & Guevara, 1954)
- Hebata mexicana (Gillette, 1898)
- Hebata minetra (Cunningham & Ross, 1965)
- Hebata minor (Zakhvatkin, 1935)
- Hebata mira (Knull, 1951)
- Hebata mochidai (Dworakowska, 1972)
- Hebata mosella (DeLong & Guevara, 1954)
- Hebata motti (Singh-Pruthi, 1940)
- Hebata mysia (Dworakowska, 1977)
- Hebata neaspersa (Oman & Wheeler, 1938)
- Hebata necyla (Davidson & DeLong, 1939)
- Hebata nema (Davidson & DeLong, 1939)
- Hebata neocurspina (Southern, 1982)
- Hebata nevadensis (Metcalf, 1968)
- Hebata ngongensis (Dworakowska, 1977)
- Hebata niaraca (Ghauri, 1979)
- Hebata nigerica (Dworakowska, 1976)
- Hebata nigra (Gillette & Baker, 1895)
- Hebata obstipa (Davidson & DeLong, 1942)
- Hebata ocala (Davidson & DeLong, 1939)
- Hebata okadai (Dworakowska, 1982)
- Hebata omani (Davidson & DeLong, 1942)
- Hebata opulenta (Distant, 1918)
- Hebata orthodens (Davidson & DeLong, 1938)
- Hebata ossiannilssoni (Nuorteva, 1948)
- Hebata pacifica (Vilbaste, 1968)
- Hebata pallidula (DeLong, 1931)
- Hebata panda (DeLong, 1931)
- Hebata paragucia (Fletcher & Liu, 2011)
- Hebata peba (Southern & Dietrich, 2010)
- Hebata pelecana (Oman & Wheeler, 1938)
- Hebata pergrada (Davidson & DeLong, 1938)
- Hebata petona (DeLong & Liles, 1956)
- Hebata planata (Ahmed, Samad & Naheed, 1981)
- Hebata polyprocessa (Fletcher & Liu, 2011)
- Hebata prona (Davidson & DeLong, 1940)
- Hebata pseudosetigera (Caldwell, 1952)
- Hebata punjabensis (Singh-Pruthi, 1940)
- Hebata pyramidata (DeLong & Caldwell, 1934)
- Hebata racina (DeLong & Liles, 1956)
- Hebata radiata (Gillette, 1898)
- Hebata ratio (DeLong & Davidson, 1935)
- Hebata recta (DeLong & Caldwell, 1934)
- Hebata recurvata (DeLong, 1931)
- Hebata reducta (Dworakowska, 1972)
- Hebata resona (DeLong & Guevara, 1954)
- Hebata ricei (Dworakowska & Pawar, 1974)
- Hebata ruandae (Dworakowska, 1977)
- Hebata rubrarea (Wheeler, 1939)
- Hebata rubraza (Oman, 1936)
- Hebata ruficeps (Van Duzee, 1917)
- Hebata rumexa (Davidson & DeLong, 1943)
- Hebata rura (Dworakowska, 1980)
- Hebata sama (Dworakowska, 1977)
- Hebata sativae (Poos, 1933)
- Hebata semanta (Davidson & DeLong, 1943)
- Hebata serrata (Vilbaste, 1965)
- Hebata serrator (Young, 1953)
- Hebata serrula (Davidson & DeLong, 1940)
- Hebata sesamae (Naheed & Ahmed, 1980)
- Hebata setata (DeLong & Davidson, 1936)
- Hebata setigera (Oman, 1936)
- Hebata shokella (Matsumura, 1931)
- Hebata sibirica (Vilbaste, 1965)
- Hebata sichotana (Anufriev, 1973)
- Hebata silvatica (Vilbaste, 1968)
- Hebata simbava (Dworakowska, 1981)
- Hebata sindhensis (Naheed & Ahmed, 1980)
- Hebata sinuata (Oman & Wheeler, 1938)
- Hebata sobella (DeLong & Liles, 1956)
- Hebata solani (Curtis, 1846)
- Hebata sonorana (Wheeler, 1940)
- Hebata sororcula (Dworakowska, 1972)
- Hebata spiculata (Oman & Wheeler, 1938)
- Hebata spinosa (Ahmed & Samad, 1972)
- Hebata spinuloides (Cunningham & Ross, 1965)
- Hebata spira (DeLong & Caldwell, 1934)
- Hebata spirosa (Dworakowska & Viraktamath, 1979)
- Hebata squamosa (Dworakowska, 1981)
- Hebata stalsisa (Davidson & DeLong, 1943)
- Hebata stata (Dworakowska, 1980)
- Hebata stylata (Wheeler, 1940)
- Hebata styliformis (Cunningham & Ross, 1965)
- Hebata suata (Dworakowska, 1997)
- Hebata sudanica (Dworakowska, 1976)
- Hebata sundaica (Bergman, 1956)
- Hebata syedi (Ahmed, Samad & Naheed, 1981)
- Hebata tabaci (Singh-Pruthi, 1940)
- Hebata tanova (Dworakowska, 1980)
- Hebata tasta (Dworakowska, 1981)
- Hebata tastara (Dworakowska, 1980)
- Hebata tavuaensis (Linnavuori, 1960)
- Hebata telpa (Southern, 1982)
- Hebata tepona (DeLong & Guevara, 1954)
- Hebata todo (Matsumura, 1931)
- Hebata tolana (DeLong & Guevara, 1954)
- Hebata tolinda (DeLong & Guevara, 1954)
- Hebata torqua (DeLong & Davidson, 1935)
- Hebata triangularis (Dworakowska, 1994)
- Hebata tuba (Dworakowska, 1980)
- Hebata undulata (Zhang & Liu, 2011)
- Hebata usata (Dworakowska, 1977)
- Hebata utrica (Davidson & DeLong, 1939)
- Hebata uvalda (Davidson & DeLong, 1939)
- Hebata uzbekorum (Zakhvatkin, 1953)
- Hebata varaspina (Oman & Wheeler, 1938)
- Hebata vastitatis (Oman & Wheeler, 1938)
- Hebata vazquezae (González, 1955)
- Hebata venusta (DeLong & Davidson, 1935)
- Hebata vergena (DeLong & Caldwell, 1934)
- Hebata vermispina (Oman & Wheeler, 1938)
- Hebata viburni (Vilbaste, 1968)
- Hebata vickiae (Liu, 2011)
- Hebata vietnamica (Dworakowska, 1972)
- Hebata vincula (DeLong, 1931)
- Hebata viridelutea (Dlabola, 1967)
- Hebata vitis (Göthe, 1875)
- Hebata volsella (Hamilton, 1987)
- Hebata xerophila (Oman & Wheeler, 1938)
- Hebata yubocola (Dworakowska, 1977)
- Hebata zanclus (Hamilton, 1987)
- Hebata zebulona (DeLong & Liles, 1956)
