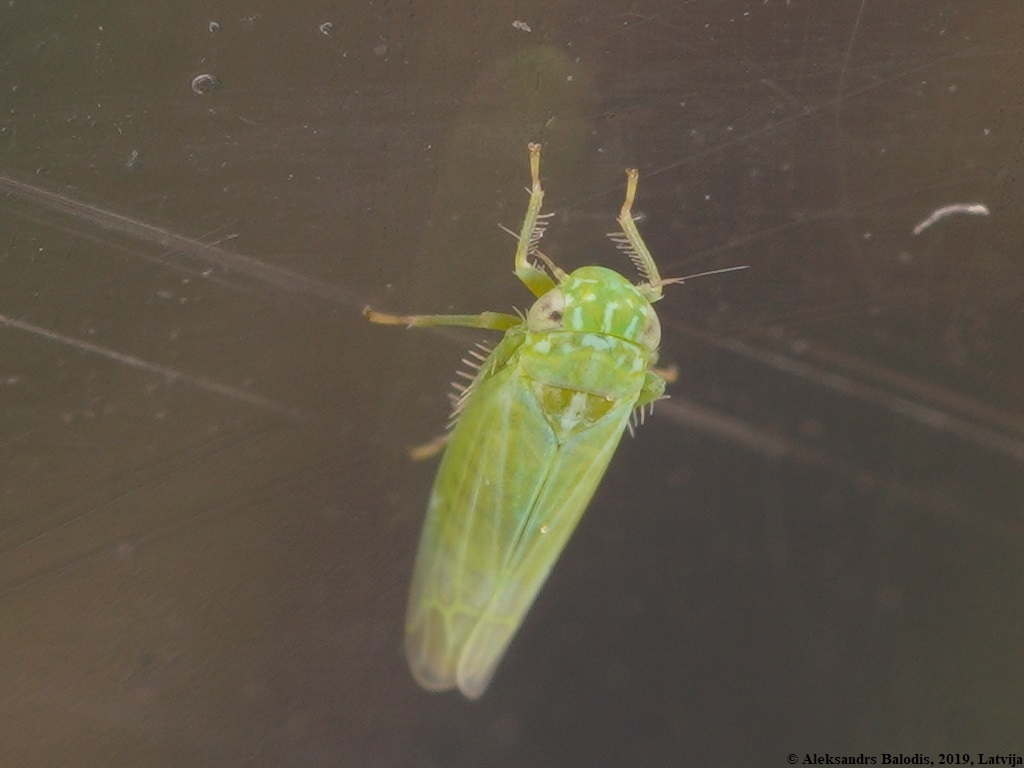
- Chlorita paolii

Scientific classification
- Domain: Eukaryota
- Kingdom: Animalia
- Phylum: Arthropoda
- Class: Insecta
- Order: Hemiptera
- Suborder: Auchenorrhyncha
- Family: Cicadellidae
- Subfamily: Typhlocybinae
- Tribe: Empoascini
- Genus: Chlorita; Fieber, 1872

= Chlorita =

Genus of true bugs

Chlorita is a genus of true bugs belonging to the family Cicadellidae.

The genus was first described by Fieber in 1872.

The species of this genus are found in Europe.

Species:

- Chlorita paolii
- Chlorita viridula
