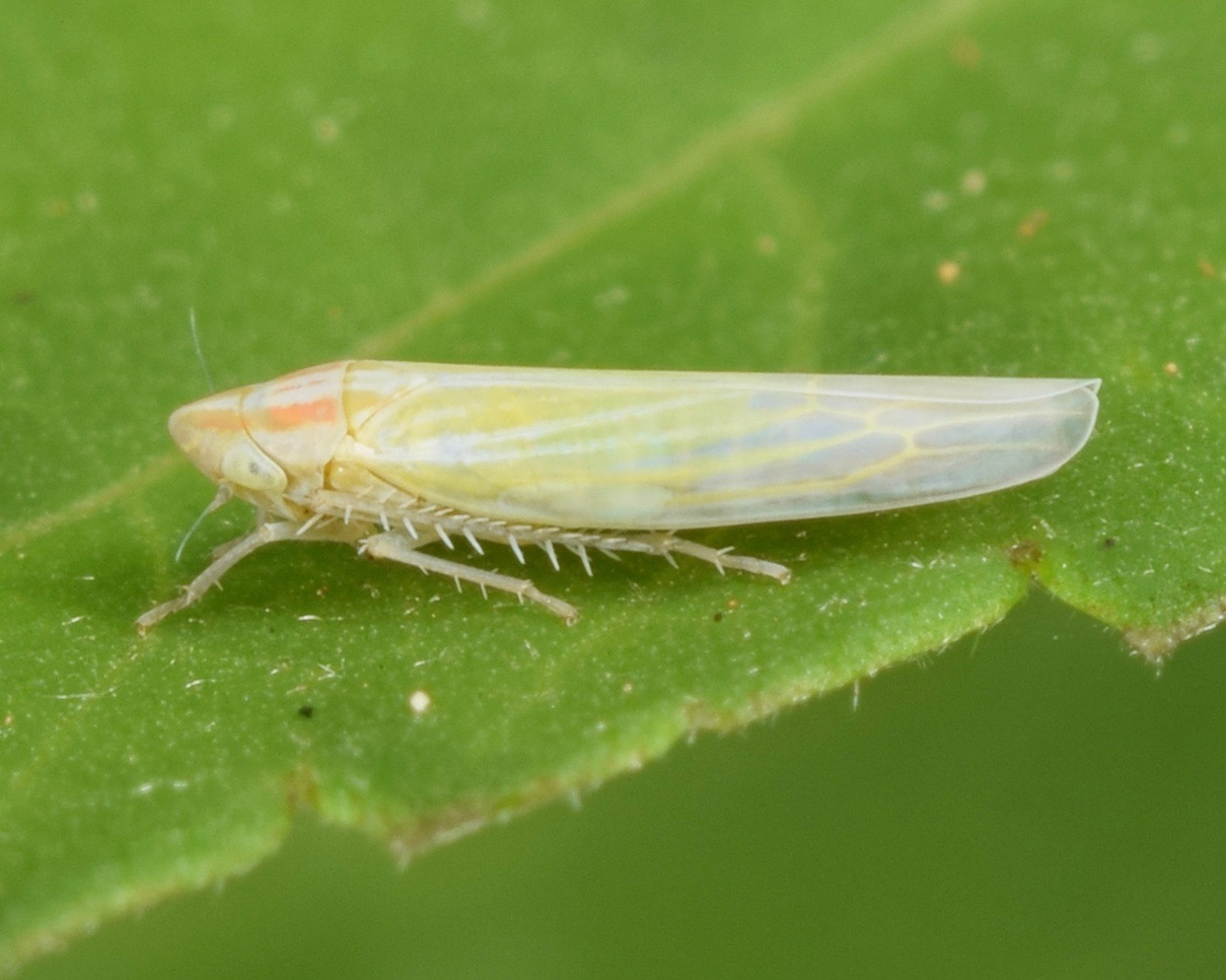
- Dikraneura angustata

Scientific classification
- Domain: Eukaryota
- Kingdom: Animalia
- Phylum: Arthropoda
- Class: Insecta
- Order: Hemiptera
- Suborder: Auchenorrhyncha
- Family: Cicadellidae
- Subfamily: Typhlocybinae
- Tribe: Dikraneurini
- Genus: Dikraneura; Hardy, 1850

= Dikraneura =

Genus of true bugs

Dikraneura is a genus of leafhoppers belonging to the family Cicadellidae subfamily Typhlocybinae. It contains approximately 50 species, with a primarily holarctic distribution, being poorly represented in the tropics.
