= Albera =

Albera may refer to:

- Albera, a genus of leafhoppers (family Cicadellidae)
- Albera Massif, a mountain range in the north of Catalonia, between France and Spain
  - Albera (cattle), indigenous to the massif
- Albera Ligure, a comune in Piedmont, Italy
- Aldo Albera (born 1923), an Italian sprint canoer
