= Amrasca biguttula =

Scientific classification
- Kingdom: Animalia
- Phylum: Arthropoda
- Class: Insecta
- Order: Hemiptera
- Suborder: Auchenorrhyncha
- Family: Cicadellidae
- Genus: Amrasca
- Species: A. biguttula

Binomial name
- Amrasca biguttula (Ishida, 1913)

Species of true bug

Amrasca biguttula, commonly known as the cotton jassid, is a subspecies of leafhopper belonging to the subfamily Typhlocybinae of family Cicadellidae. It is a pest of cotton, okra, and other crops in southern Asia and West Africa.

== Description ==
The adult cotton jassid is a long and slender insect about 2.6 mm (0.1 in) in length. It is yellowish-green, with a conspicuous black spot on either side of the head and another near the tip of the fore wing. The head is pale green and the membranous wings transparent and iridescent. On leaf surfaces, the insect tends to move about diagonally, and when disturbed it immediately jumps and flies away.

== Life cycle ==
Leafhoppers undergo direct development from nymph to adult without undergoing metamorphosis. On okra, eggs are mainly oviposited inside the tissue of leaf blades, but may also be laid in leaf stalks or in soft twigs. The eggs hatch in six or seven days. There are five nymphal instars, developing over a period of about seven days. Nymphs are wingless. Total lifespan is about one month, with females living a little longer than males. The fecundity of females is about fifteen eggs. Adults are attracted to light, females more than males.

== Ecology ==
Leafhoppers have mouthparts designed for piercing and sucking, enabling them to feed on plant sap. In India, this jassid feeds on sap from a wide range of plants including cotton, okra, eggplant, Hibiscus rosa-sinensis, and sunflower throughout the year, and on pigeon pea and cowpea during the monsoon season. In Burkina Faso, this jassid attacks cotton, okra, eggplant and hibiscus during the rainy season. It also occurs on various grasses, including lawns of Bermuda grass.

== Damage ==
Heavy infestations on cotton, okra, and sunflower make the leaves turn yellow, curl up and fall off. The insects also secrete honeydew, and sooty mould often grows on this, restricting the amount of light reaching the plant's photosynthetic surfaces and reducing the yield. In many areas, this pest regularly occurs on cotton in epidemic numbers. A number of natural enemies help to control populations including ladybirds, predatory lygaeid bugs, and several species of mantis. Neem oil can be used as a biopesticide.

== Control ==
On cotton, it has been found that growing a cultivar with hairs on the undersides of the leaves reduces infestation, and that long hairs are better at deterring the insect from laying than are short hairs; this seems to be due to the hairs preventing the insect from getting close enough to the leaf surface to deposit its eggs.

The Entomophthoraceae fungus Batkoa amrascae is known to infect (and also kill) the cotton leafhopper, Amrasca biguttula in the Philippines.
