= Amrasca =

Scientific classification
- Kingdom: Animalia
- Phylum: Arthropoda
- Clade: Pancrustacea
- Class: Insecta
- Order: Hemiptera
- Suborder: Auchenorrhyncha
- Family: Cicadellidae
- Subfamily: Typhlocybinae
- Tribe: Empoascini
- Genus: Amrasca; Ghauri, 1967

Type species
- Amrasca splendens Ghauri, 1967

Genus of true bugs

Amrasca is a genus of true bugs belonging to the family Cicadellidae. The genus is placed in the subfamily Typhlocybinae. There are about 14 species in the genus in the Indomalayan and Australasian Realms. The genus is characterized by venation characteristics in the forewing. Several species are of economic importance as they feed on crops like cotton, okra, jute and

Species in the genus include:

- A. (Amrasca) apicoserrata Sohi, 1977 —India, Sri Lanka
- A. (Amrasca) bella Dworakowska, 1977 —Vietnam
- A. (Amrasca) bombaxia (Ghauri, 1965) —China (Hainan), India, Indonesia, Sri Lanka, Vietnam, Bangladesh
- A. (Amrasca) complana Qin, Wang & Xu, 2017—China (Sichuan, Yunnan, Hainan)
- A. (Amrasca) delhiensis Sohi, Mann & Shenhmar, 1987—India
- A. (Amrasca) elongata Ahmed, Samad & Naheed, 1981—Pakistan
- A. (Amrasca) pringlei Dworakowska, 1994—Sri Lanka
- A. (Amrasca) sesuvii (Linnavuori, 1960)—Micronesia
- A. (Amrasca) splendens Ghauri, 1967—China (Hainan), India, Indonesia, Sri Lanka, Thailand, Vietnam, Bangladesh
- A. (Amrasca) terraereginae (Paoli, 1936)—Australia, Banglades
- A. (Quartasca) czerwcowa (Dworakowska, 1972)—China (Hainan, Sichuan, Yunnan, Guangdong), Vietnam
- A. (Sundapteryx) biguttula (Ishida, 1913)—China (Northeast China, Hebei, Shaanxi, Henan, Shandong, Jiangsu,

Anhui, Zhejiang, Hubei, Hunan, Jiangxi, Hainan, Taiwan), Japan, Oriental region, India, Indonesia, Pakistan, Philippines, Sri Lanka, Thailand, Vietnam, Bangladesh, Afghanistan, Micronesia
