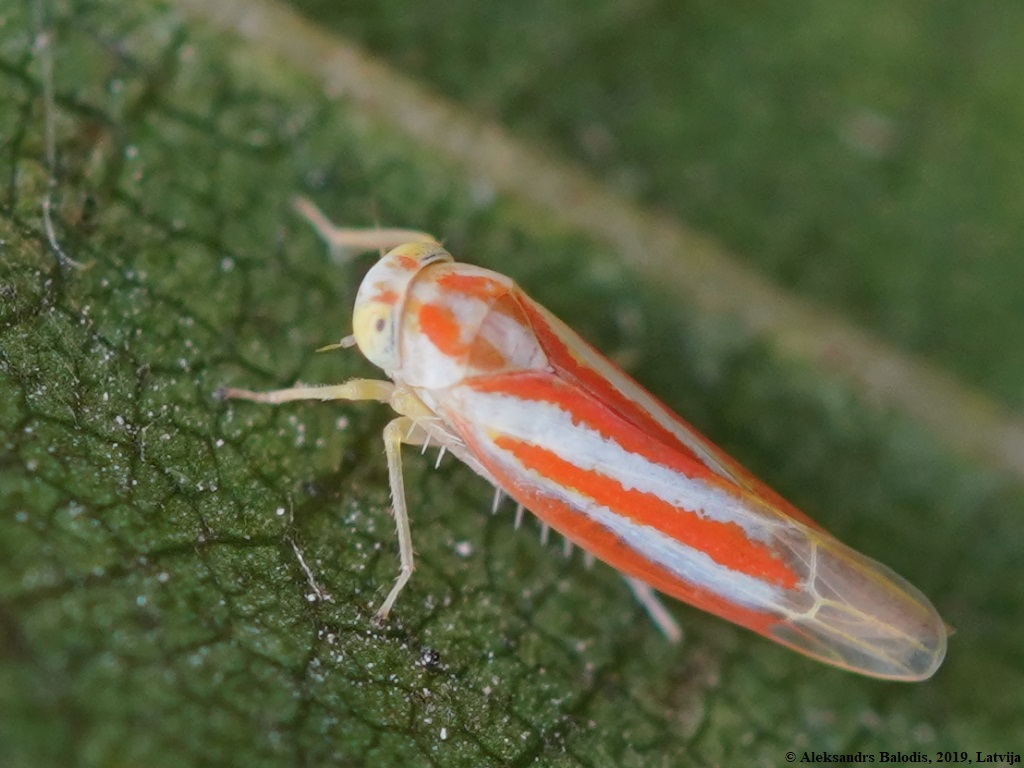
- Alebra albostriella

Scientific classification
- Kingdom: Animalia
- Phylum: Arthropoda
- Clade: Pancrustacea
- Class: Insecta
- Order: Hemiptera
- Suborder: Auchenorrhyncha
- Family: Cicadellidae
- Tribe: Alebrini
- Genus: Alebra; Fieber, 1872

= Alebra =

Genus of true bugs

Alebra is a genus of leafhoppers in the subfamily Typhlocybinae. They genetically evolved their exoskeleton to achieve vibrant colors to defend themselves from predators.

== Species ==
These 22 species belong to the genus Alebra:

- Alebra albostriella (Fallén, 1826)^{c g}
- Alebra arisana (Matsumura, 1931)^{c g}
- Alebra aurea (Walsh, 1862)^{c g b}
- Alebra bella Hamilton, 1995^{c g}
- Alebra bicincta DeLong, 1918^{c g b}
- Alebra castaneae Hamilton, 1995^{c g}
- Alebra coryli Le Quesne, 1977^{c g}
- Alebra costatella Matsumura, 1931^{c g}
- Alebra eburnea DeLong, 1918^{c g b}
- Alebra elegans Hamilton, 1995^{c g b}
- Alebra floridae Hamilton, 1995^{c g}
- Alebra fumida Gillette, 1898^{c g b}
- Alebra kuyania (Matsumura, 1932)^{c g}
- Alebra neglecta Wagner, 1940^{c g}
- Alebra pallida Dworakowska, 1968^{c g}
- Alebra rubrafrons DeLong, 1918^{c g b}
- Alebra shaanxiensis (Ma, 1981)^{c g}
- Alebra sorbi Wagner, 1949^{c g}
- Alebra thoracica Hamilton, 1995^{c g b}
- Alebra viridis Rey, 1894^{c g}
- Alebra wahlbergi (Boheman, 1845)^{c g b}
- Alebra xianensis (Ma, 1981)^{c g}

Data sources: i = ITIS, c = Catalogue of Life, g = GBIF, b = Bugguide.net,
