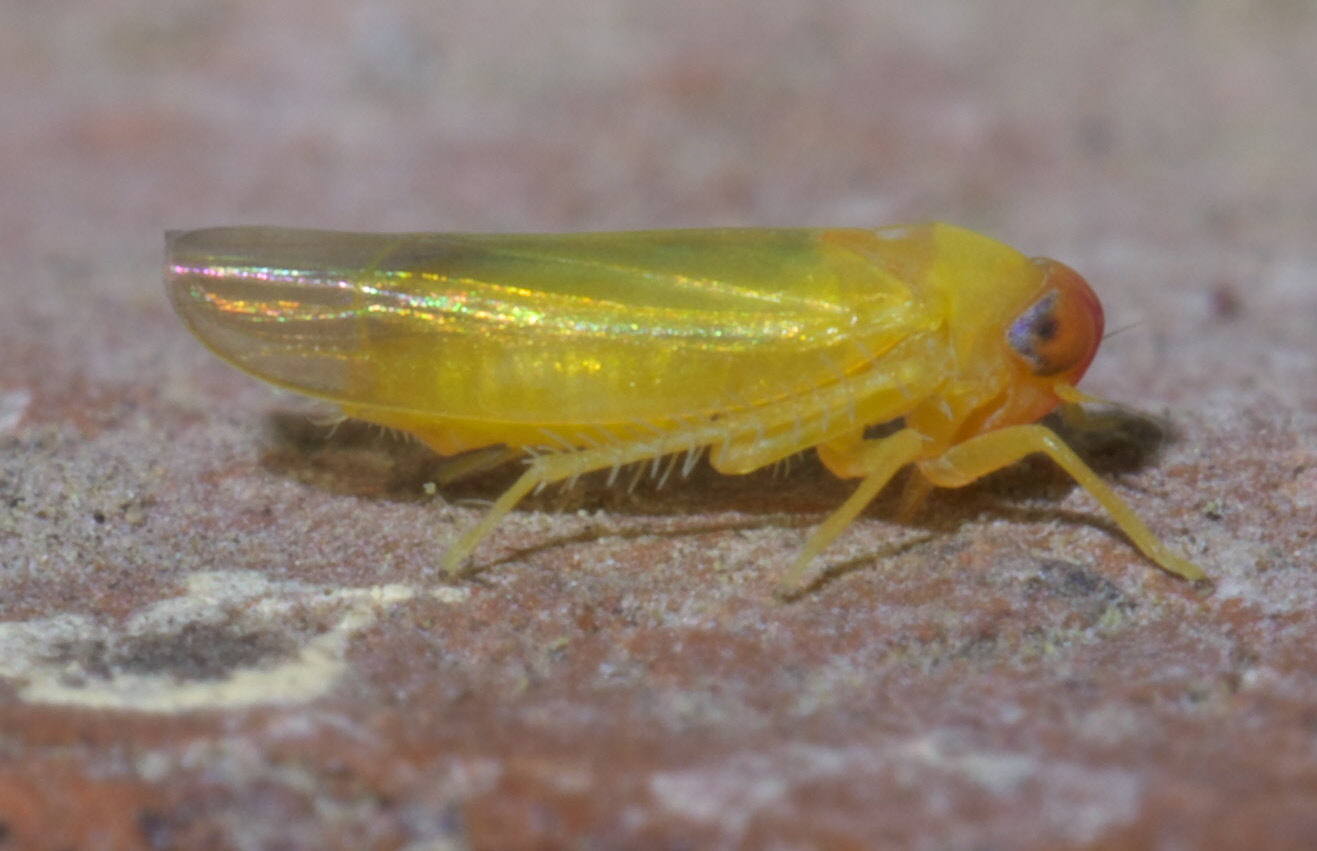

Scientific classification
- Domain: Eukaryota
- Kingdom: Animalia
- Phylum: Arthropoda
- Class: Insecta
- Order: Hemiptera
- Suborder: Auchenorrhyncha
- Family: Cicadellidae
- Genus: Alebra
- Species: A. rubrafrons

Binomial name
- Alebra rubrafrons DeLong, 1918

= Alebra rubrafrons =

Species of true bug

Alebra rubrafrons is a species of leafhopper in the family Cicadellidae.

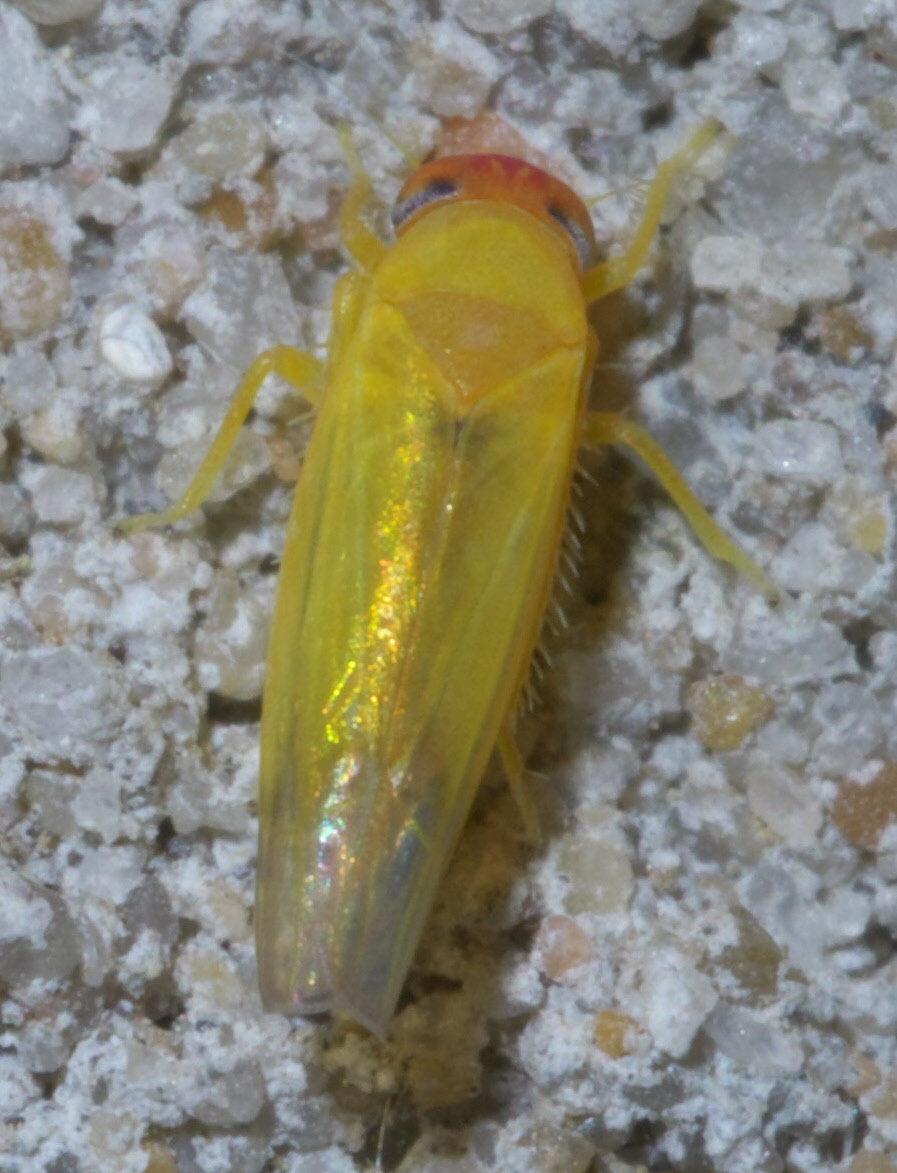
