= Dziwneono =

Scientific classification
- Kingdom: Animalia
- Phylum: Arthropoda
- Clade: Pancrustacea
- Class: Insecta
- Order: Hemiptera
- Suborder: Auchenorrhyncha
- Family: Cicadellidae
- Tribe: Dikraneurini
- Genus: Dziwneono; Dworakowska, 1972

Species
- Dziwneono alfa; Dziwneono olszewskii; Dziwneono sagittata; Dziwneono septembris; Dziwneono etcetera; Dziwneono weewaa

Genus of true bugs

Dziwneono (subfamily:Typhlocybinae) is a genus of Australian leafhoppers, with more than ten undescribed species. It was described in 1972 by Polish entomologist Irena Dworakowska.

The genus name is a biological nomenclature curiosity: dziwne ono [ˈd͡ʑiv.nɛ ˈɔ.nɔ] is Polish for "it is strange."

== Distribution ==
Species of Dziwneono have been found in the Northern Territory and Western Australia states of Australia.

== Species ==
- Dziwneono alfa Dworakowska, 1993
- Dziwneono etcetera Dworakowska, 1972
- Dziwneono olszewskii Dworakowska, 1972
- Dziwneono sagittata Dworakowska, 1993
- Dziwneono septembris Dworakowska, 1972
- Dziwneono weewaa Dworakowska, 1972
