= Irena Dworakowska =

Polish entomologist

- Born: 1941 (age 84–85)
- Known for: Typhlocybinae taxonomy and names
- Scientific career
- Fields: Entomology

Irena Dworakowska (born 1941) is a Polish entomologist who specialized in hemipterology.

== Career ==
She was active at the Uniwersytet Warszawski, Museum and Institute of Zoology of Polish Academy of Sciences and University of British Columbia in Vancouver.

Dworakowska provided major contributions into systematics and taxonomy of global fauna of Typhlocybinae subfamily of leafhoppers. Publishing since the late 60s she described many genera and species new to the science. In her earlier works she revised difficult genera of the Western Palaearctic such as Eupteryx, Eurhadina and Kybos. Later publications are focused on Oriental and Ethiopian regions.

Dworakowska has authored a large number of genera and is known for unusual names she coined, such as Yakuza, Dziwneono (pl: it is strange), Kropka (pl: a dot), Koperta (pl: envelope) or Niedoida (pl: niedojda - duffer).

As a name authority she is cited as Dworakowska.

== Legacy ==
Two genera have been named in tribute to her: Dworakowskaia and Irenaneura.
