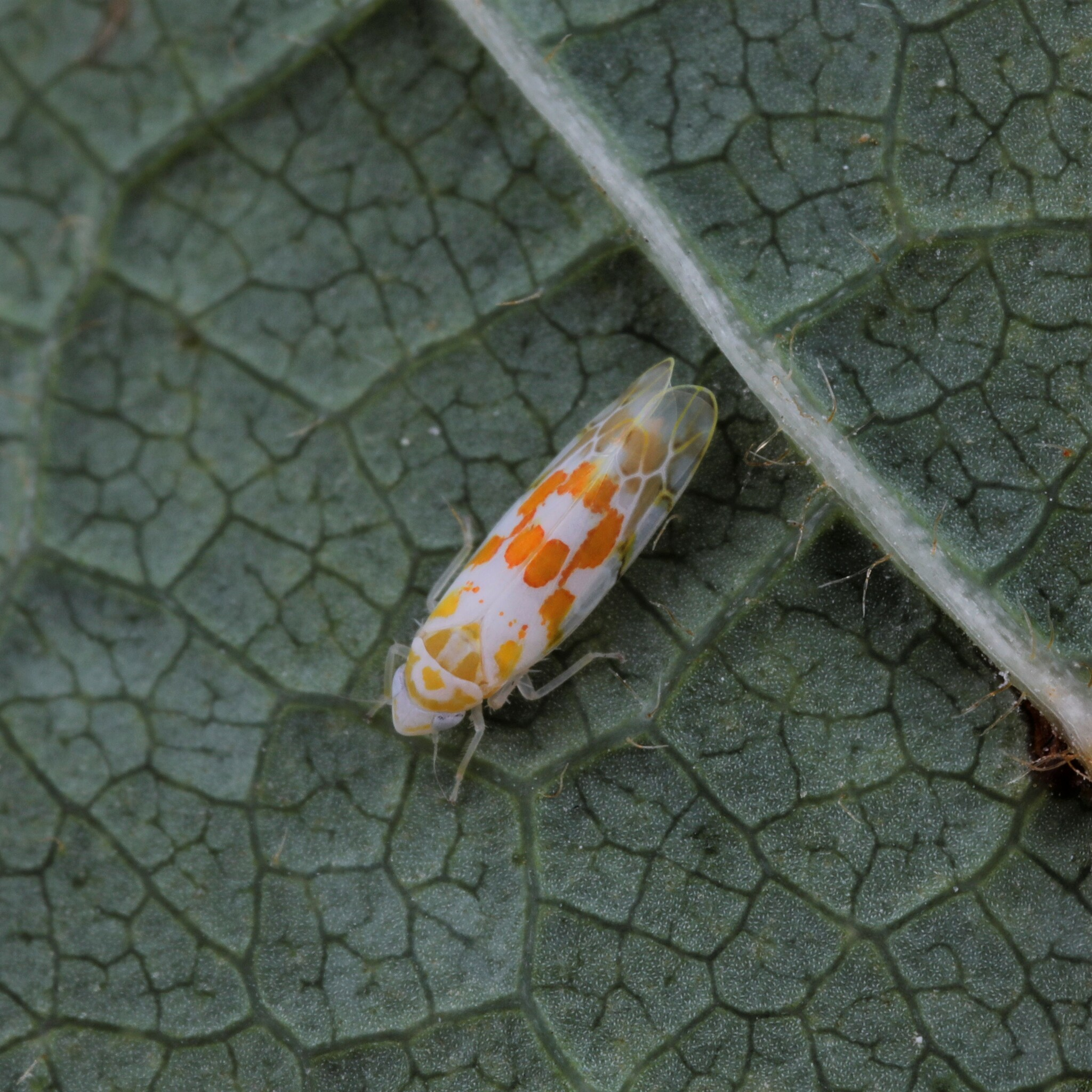
- Typhlocyba quercus

Scientific classification
- Kingdom: Animalia
- Phylum: Arthropoda
- Class: Insecta
- Order: Hemiptera
- Suborder: Auchenorrhyncha
- Family: Cicadellidae
- Genus: Typhlocyba; Germar, 1833

Synonyms
- Anomia Fieber, 1866; Thyphlocyba and other orthographic variants; Typhlocypha Scudder, 1881

= Typhlocyba =

Genus of true bugs

Typhlocyba is a genus of leafhoppers typical of the subfamily Typhlocybinae and tribe Typhlocybini, found worldwide: especially in the Palaearctic, Nearctic and Oriental realms.

== Species ==
The World Auchenorrhyncha Database includes:

1. Typhlocyba afghana Dlabola, 1971
2. Typhlocyba africana Dworakowska, 1979
3. Typhlocyba alabamaensis Christian, 1953
4. Typhlocyba albida Thapa, 1989
5. Typhlocyba andromache McAtee, 1926
6. Typhlocyba aptera Dworakowska, 1979
7. Typhlocyba arborea Dworakowska, 1979
8. Typhlocyba arsinoe McAtee, 1926
9. Typhlocyba athene McAtee, 1926
10. Typhlocyba attenuata Christian, 1953
11. Typhlocyba aureolineata Ruppel & DeLong, 1953
12. Typhlocyba babai Ishihara, 1958
13. Typhlocyba beameri Christian, 1960
14. Typhlocyba bilaminata Huang & Zhang, 2009
15. Typhlocyba calemia (Walker, 1851)
16. Typhlocyba cassiopeia Knull, 1945
17. Typhlocyba chandrai Dworakowska, 1981
18. Typhlocyba choui Huang & Zhang, 2012
19. Typhlocyba coronulifera Anufriev, 1988
20. Typhlocyba crassa DeLong & Johnson, 1936
21. Typhlocyba daliensis Huang & Zhang, 2012
22. Typhlocyba dama Dworakowska, 1994
23. Typhlocyba equata Dworakowska, 1982
24. Typhlocyba erythrinae Koningsberger & Zimmermann, 1901
25. Typhlocyba ethiopica Dworakowska, 1979
26. Typhlocyba ferruginea Thapa, 1989
27. Typhlocyba ghanii Ahmed, Naheed & Samad, 1981
28. Typhlocyba inflata Christian, 1953
29. Typhlocyba irenae Sharma, 1984
30. Typhlocyba ismaili Ahmed, Naheed & Samad, 1981
31. Typhlocyba juglansae Ahmed, Naheed & Samad, 1981
32. Typhlocyba karachiensis Ahmed & Jabbar, 1971
33. Typhlocyba lautipennis Stål, 1859
34. Typhlocyba maderae Lindberg, 1961
35. Typhlocyba marginata Walker, 1851
36. Typhlocyba medleri Christian, 1953
37. Typhlocyba medleriana Dworakowska, 1979
38. Typhlocyba melite McAtee, 1926
39. Typhlocyba modesta Gibson, 1917
40. Typhlocyba montana Dworakowska, 1982
41. Typhlocyba napoensis Huang & Zhang, 2009
42. Typhlocyba newara Dworakowska, 1981
43. Typhlocyba nigeriana Dworakowska, 1979
44. Typhlocyba niobe McAtee, 1926
45. Typhlocyba oneka Knull, 1945
46. Typhlocyba parababai Cai & Shen, 1998
47. Typhlocyba piariae Sharma, 1984
48. Typhlocyba prasina Blanchard, 1852
49. Typhlocyba putmani Knull, 1945
50. Typhlocyba quadriappendicula Chiang, Hsu & Knight, 1989
51. Typhlocyba quercus (Fabricius, 1777) - type species (as Cicada quercus Fabricius, 1777)
52. Typhlocyba quercussimilis Dworakowska, 1967
53. Typhlocyba rahmani Ahmed, Naheed & Samad, 1981
54. Typhlocyba rubriocellata Malloch, 1920
55. Typhlocyba serrata Huang & Zhang, 2009
56. Typhlocyba shawneeana Knull, 1945
57. Typhlocyba simlensis Dworakowska, 1981
58. Typhlocyba sollisa Ross & DeLong, 1949
59. Typhlocyba surcula DeLong & Johnson, 1936
60. Typhlocyba tata Dworakowska, 1994
61. Typhlocyba tortosa Ross & DeLong, 1949
62. Typhlocyba transviridis Christian, 1953
63. Typhlocyba triannulata Huang & Zhang, 2009
64. Typhlocyba trimaculata Huang & Zhang, 2012
65. Typhlocyba tubercula Huang & Zhang, 2009
66. Typhlocyba unicorn Hamilton, 1987
67. Typhlocyba virescens Blanchard, 1852
68. Typhlocyba warana Dworakowska, 1981
69. Typhlocyba yacaba Dworakowska, 1994
