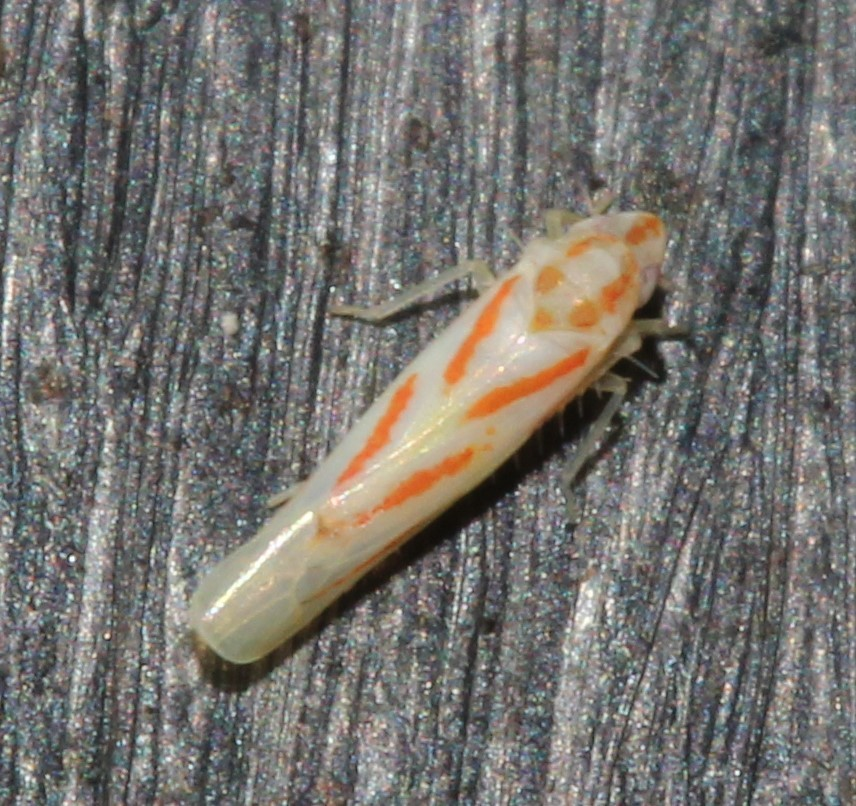
- Dikrella cruentata

Scientific classification
- Domain: Eukaryota
- Kingdom: Animalia
- Phylum: Arthropoda
- Class: Insecta
- Order: Hemiptera
- Suborder: Auchenorrhyncha
- Family: Cicadellidae
- Subfamily: Typhlocybinae
- Tribe: Dikraneurini
- Subtribe: Dikraneurina
- Genus: Dikrella; Oman, 1949

= Dikrella =

Genus of true bugs

Dikrella is a genus of leafhoppers belonging to the family Cicadellidae subfamily Typhlocybinae. It contains approximately 37 species occurring in the United States, Mexico, Costa Rica, Cuba, Puerto Rico, Panama, Ecuador, Colombia, and Brazil.

Dikrella californica has been used as an intermediary host to Anagnus epos, a parasitic wasp used to control the western grape leafhopper, Erythroneura elegantula.
