= Linnavuoriana =

Scientific classification
- Domain: Eukaryota
- Kingdom: Animalia
- Phylum: Arthropoda
- Class: Insecta
- Order: Hemiptera
- Suborder: Auchenorrhyncha
- Family: Cicadellidae
- Genus: Linnavuoriana; Dlabola, 1958

Genus of true bugs

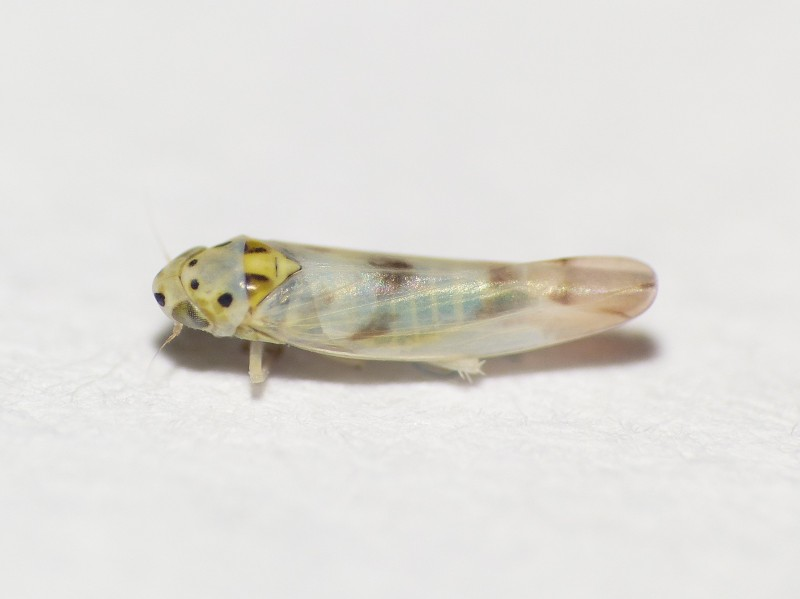
Linnavuoriana sexmaculata

Linnavuoriana is a genus of true bugs belonging to the family Cicadellidae.

he species of this genus are found in Europe.

Species:

- Linnavuoriana antiqua Dworakowska, 1982
- Linnavuoriana decempunctata (Fallen, 1806)
