= Shumka =

Scientific classification
- Domain: Eukaryota
- Kingdom: Animalia
- Phylum: Arthropoda
- Class: Insecta
- Order: Hemiptera
- Suborder: Auchenorrhyncha
- Family: Cicadellidae
- Genus: Shumka

Genus of true bugs

Shumka is a genus of true bugs belonging to the family Cicadellidae.

Species:

- Shumka irmgardae (Dworakowska, 1994)
- Shumka versicolor Dworakowska, 1997
- Shumka wareeae Dworakowska, 1997
