= Alebrini =

Scientific classification
- Domain: Eukaryota
- Kingdom: Animalia
- Phylum: Arthropoda
- Class: Insecta
- Order: Hemiptera
- Suborder: Auchenorrhyncha
- Family: Cicadellidae
- Subfamily: Typhlocybinae
- Tribe: Alebrini; McAtee, 1926

Type genus
- Alebra Fieber, 1872

Genera
- See text

Tribe of leafhoppers

Alebrini is a leafhopper tribe in the subfamily Typhlocybinae.

== Genera ==
- Abrabra
- Abrela
- Afralebra
- Albera
- Alebra
- Aphanalebra
- Arbelana
- Asialebra
- Balera
- Barela
- Beamerulus
- Benglebra
- Brunerella
- Diceratalebra
- Elabra
- Erabla
- Habralebra
- Hadralebra
- Hussainiana
- Lareba
- Lawsonellus
- Omegalebra
- Orientalebra
- Orsalebra
- Osbornulus
- Paralebra
- Protalebra
- Protalebrella
- Rabela
- Relaba
- Rhabdotalebra
- Shaddai
- Sobrala
- Trypanalebra
