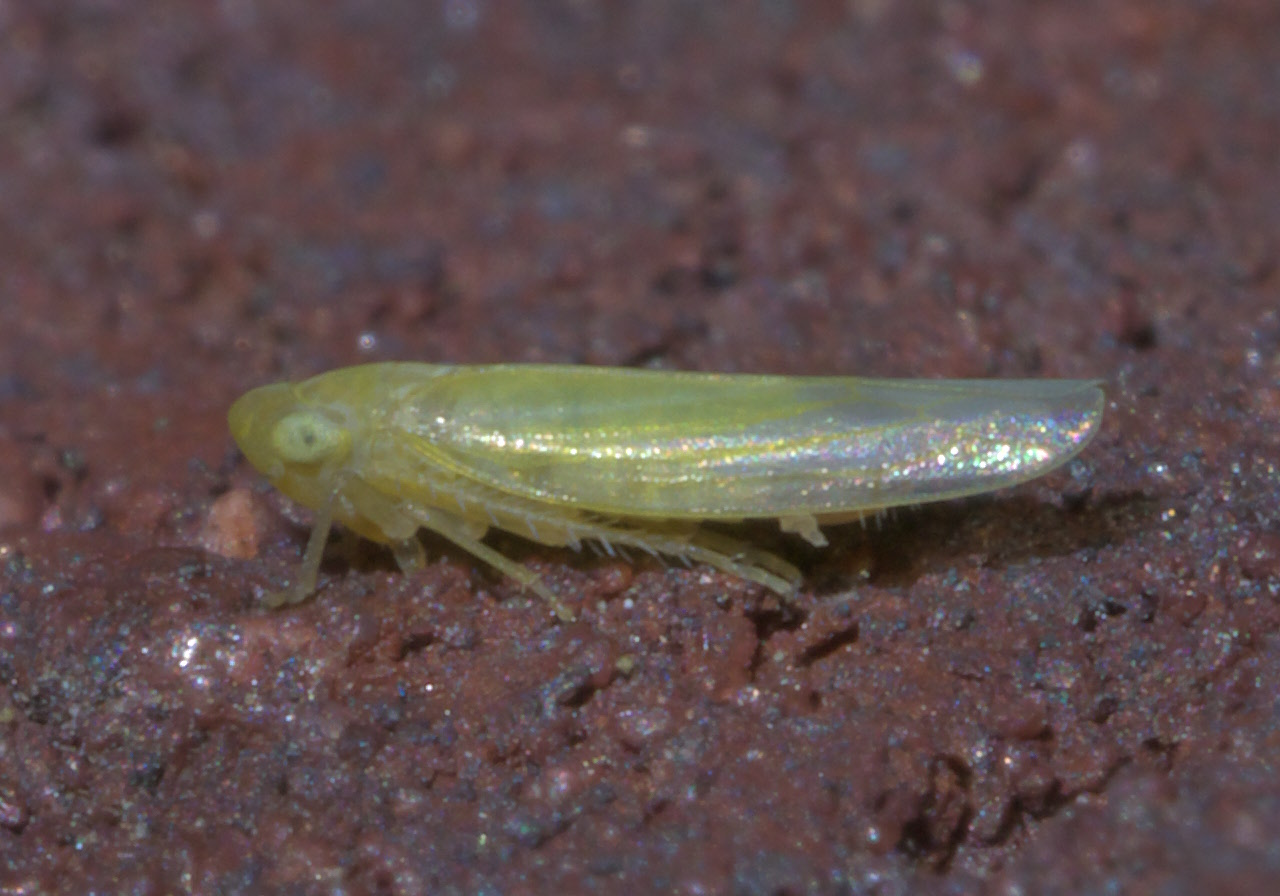
- Forcipata loca

Scientific classification
- Domain: Eukaryota
- Kingdom: Animalia
- Phylum: Arthropoda
- Class: Insecta
- Order: Hemiptera
- Suborder: Auchenorrhyncha
- Family: Cicadellidae
- Tribe: Dikraneurini
- Genus: Forcipata; DeLong & Caldwell, 1942

= Forcipata =

Genus of leafhoppers

Forcipata is a genus of leafhoppers in the family Cicadellidae. There are at least 20 described species in Forcipata.

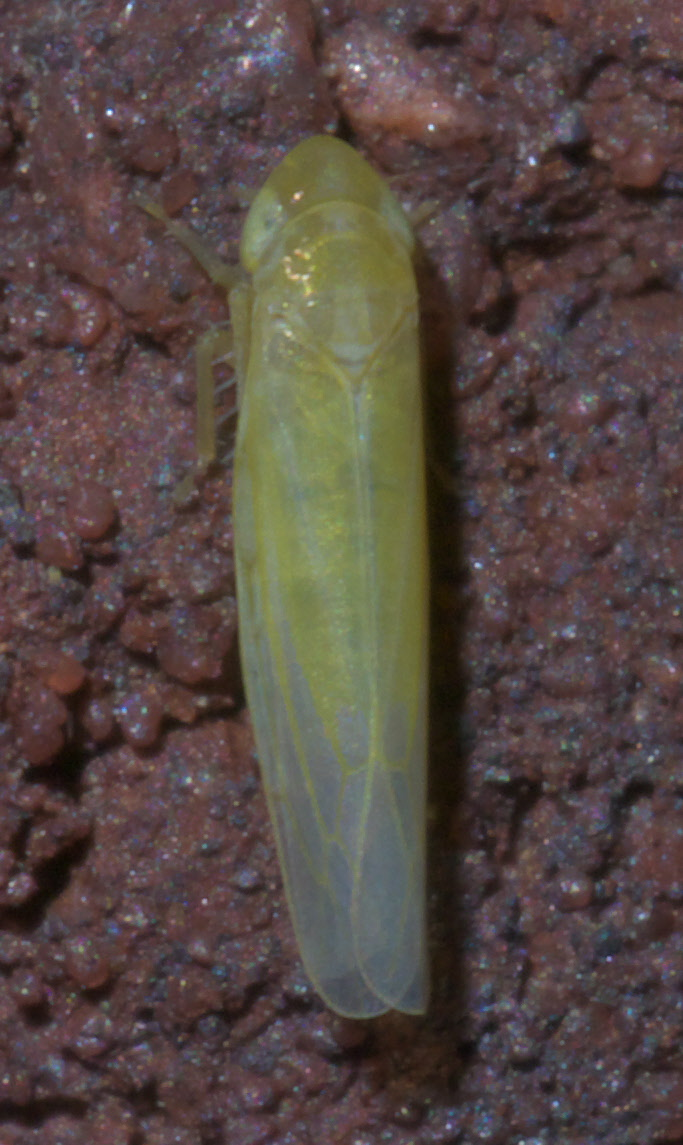
Forcipata loca

== Species ==
These 26 species belong to the genus Forcipata:

- Forcipata acclina DeLong & Caldwell, 1936^{c g}
- Forcipata ancantha DeLong & Caldwell, 1936^{c g}
- Forcipata calipera DeLong & Caldwell, 1936^{c g}
- Forcipata citrinella (Zetterstedt, 1828)^{c g}
- Forcipata demissa Logvinenko, 1981^{c g}
- Forcipata elianae Poggi, 2012^{c g}
- Forcipata euxina Gnezdilov, 2000^{c g}
- Forcipata flava Vidano, 1965^{c g}
- Forcipata forcipata (Flor, 1861)^{c g}
- Forcipata forficula Hamilton, 1998^{c g}
- Forcipata frigida (Beirne, 1955)^{c g}
- Forcipata glaucans Anufriev, 1969^{c g}
- Forcipata ips Hamilton, 1998^{c g}
- Forcipata lobata Beamer, 1938^{c g}
- Forcipata loca DeLong & Caldwell, 1936^{c g b}
- Forcipata magna DeLong & Caldwell, 1936^{c g}
- Forcipata major (Wagner, 1947)^{c g}
- Forcipata montana Hamilton, 1998^{c g}
- Forcipata obtusa Vidano, 1965^{c g}
- Forcipata ohioensis DeLong & Caldwell, 1936^{c g}
- Forcipata ortha DeLong & Caldwell, 1936^{c g}
- Forcipata palustris Holgersen, 1993^{c g}
- Forcipata sicula DeLong & Caldwell, 1936^{c g}
- Forcipata triquetra DeLong & Caldwell, 1936^{c g}
- Forcipata unica Hamilton, 1998^{c g}
- Forcipata xlix Hamilton, 1998^{c g}

Data sources: i = ITIS, c = Catalogue of Life, g = GBIF, b = Bugguide.net
