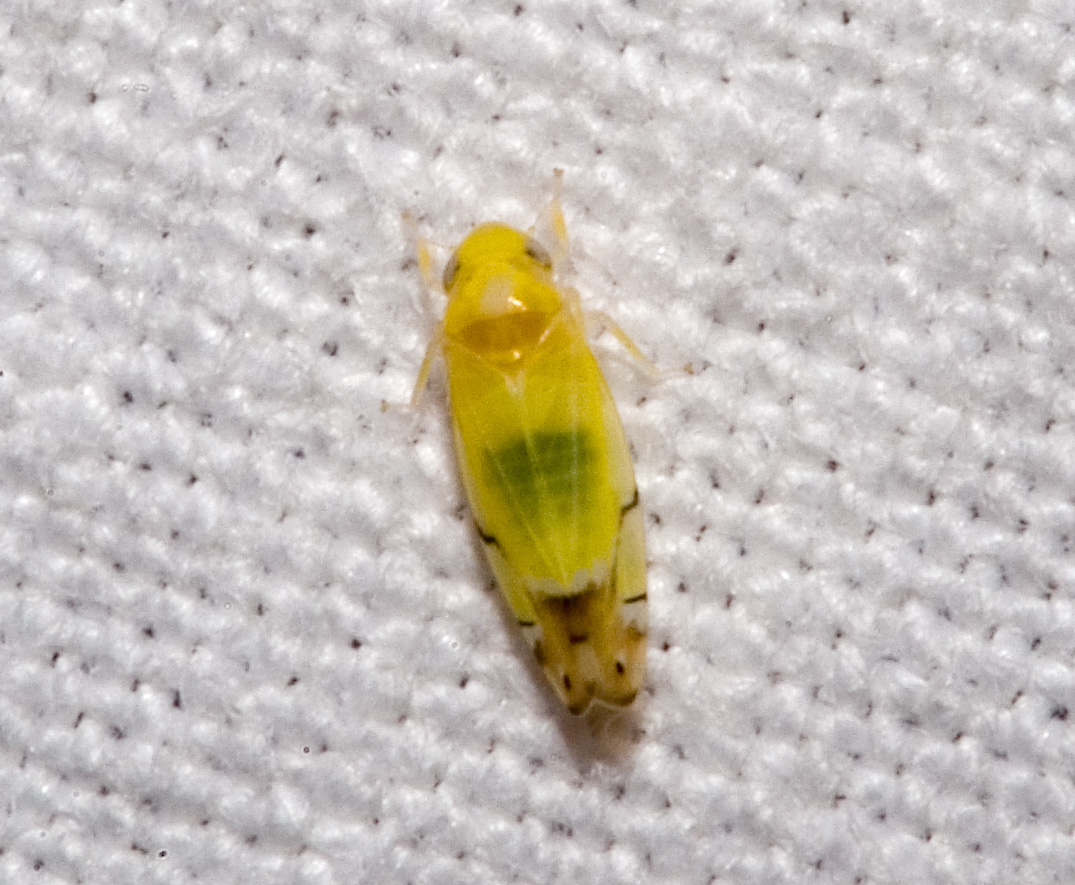
- Eurhadina pulchella

Scientific classification
- Kingdom: Animalia
- Phylum: Arthropoda
- Clade: Pancrustacea
- Class: Insecta
- Order: Hemiptera
- Suborder: Auchenorrhyncha
- Family: Cicadellidae
- Subfamily: Typhlocybinae
- Tribe: Typhlocybini
- Genus: Eurhadina; Haupt, 1929

= Eurhadina =

Genus of true bugs

Eurhadina is a genus of leafhoppers belonging to the family Cicadellidae. It was first described by Hermann Haupt in 1929.

The species of this genus are found in Eurasia.

Species:

- Eurhadina cervina
- Eurhadina concinna
- Eurhadina dashuensis
- Eurhadina pulchella
