= Albera picea =

Scientific classification
- Domain: Eukaryota
- Kingdom: Animalia
- Phylum: Arthropoda
- Class: Insecta
- Order: Hemiptera
- Suborder: Auchenorrhyncha
- Family: Cicadellidae
- Subfamily: Typhlocybinae
- Tribe: Alebrini
- Genus: Albera; Young, 1957
- Species: A. picea

Binomial name
- Albera picea (Osborn, 1928)

Synonyms
- Protalebra picea Osborn, 1928

Genus of leafhoppers

Albera is a genus of leafhoppers belonging to the family Cicadellidae, containing a single described species, Albera picea.
