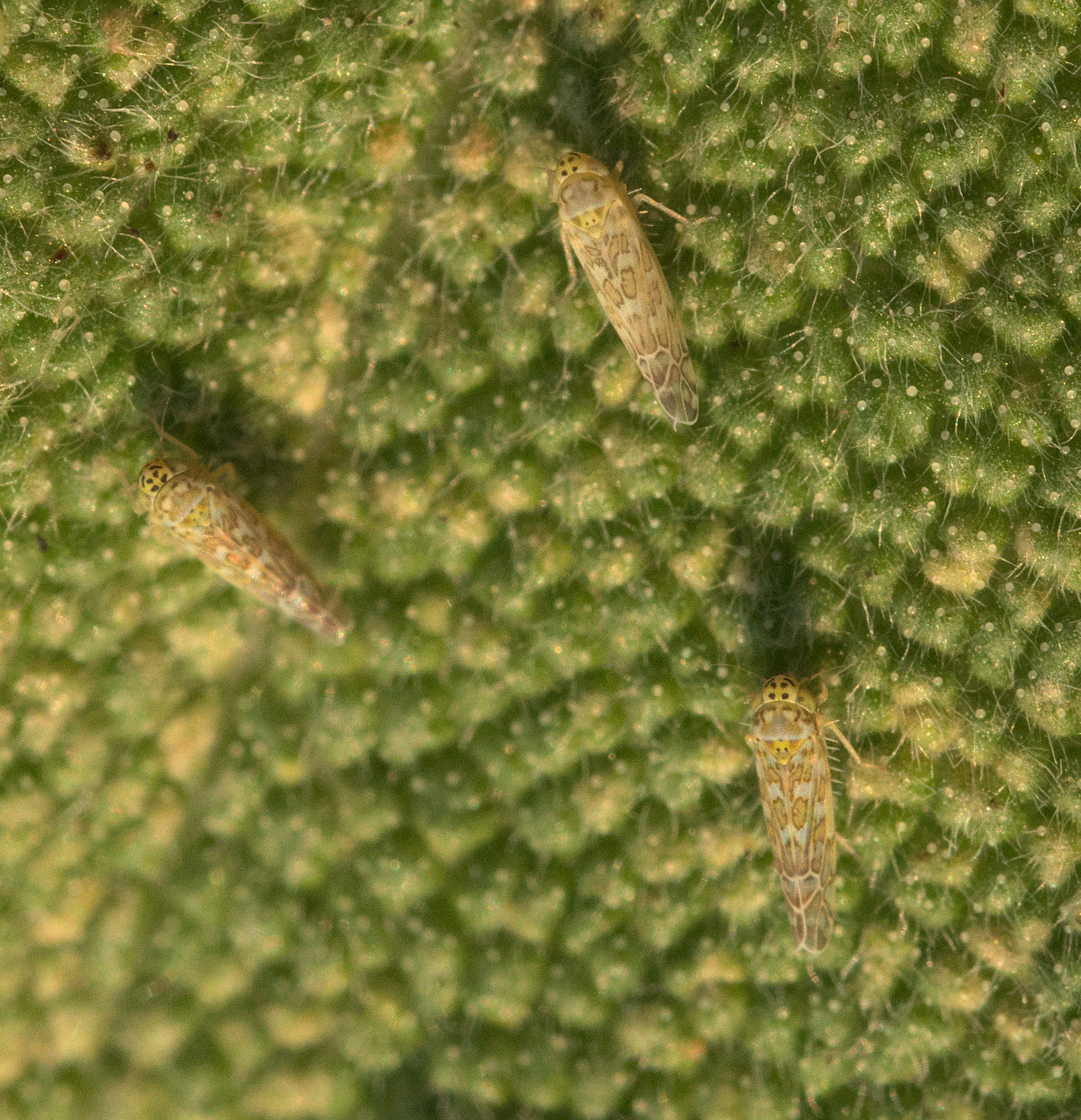

Scientific classification
- Domain: Eukaryota
- Kingdom: Animalia
- Phylum: Arthropoda
- Class: Insecta
- Order: Hemiptera
- Suborder: Auchenorrhyncha
- Family: Cicadellidae
- Genus: Eupteryx
- Species: E. decemnotata

Binomial name
- Eupteryx decemnotata Rey, 1891

= Eupteryx decemnotata =

Species of true bug

Eupteryx decemnotata, the ligurian leafhopper, is a species of leafhopper in the family Cicadellidae.
