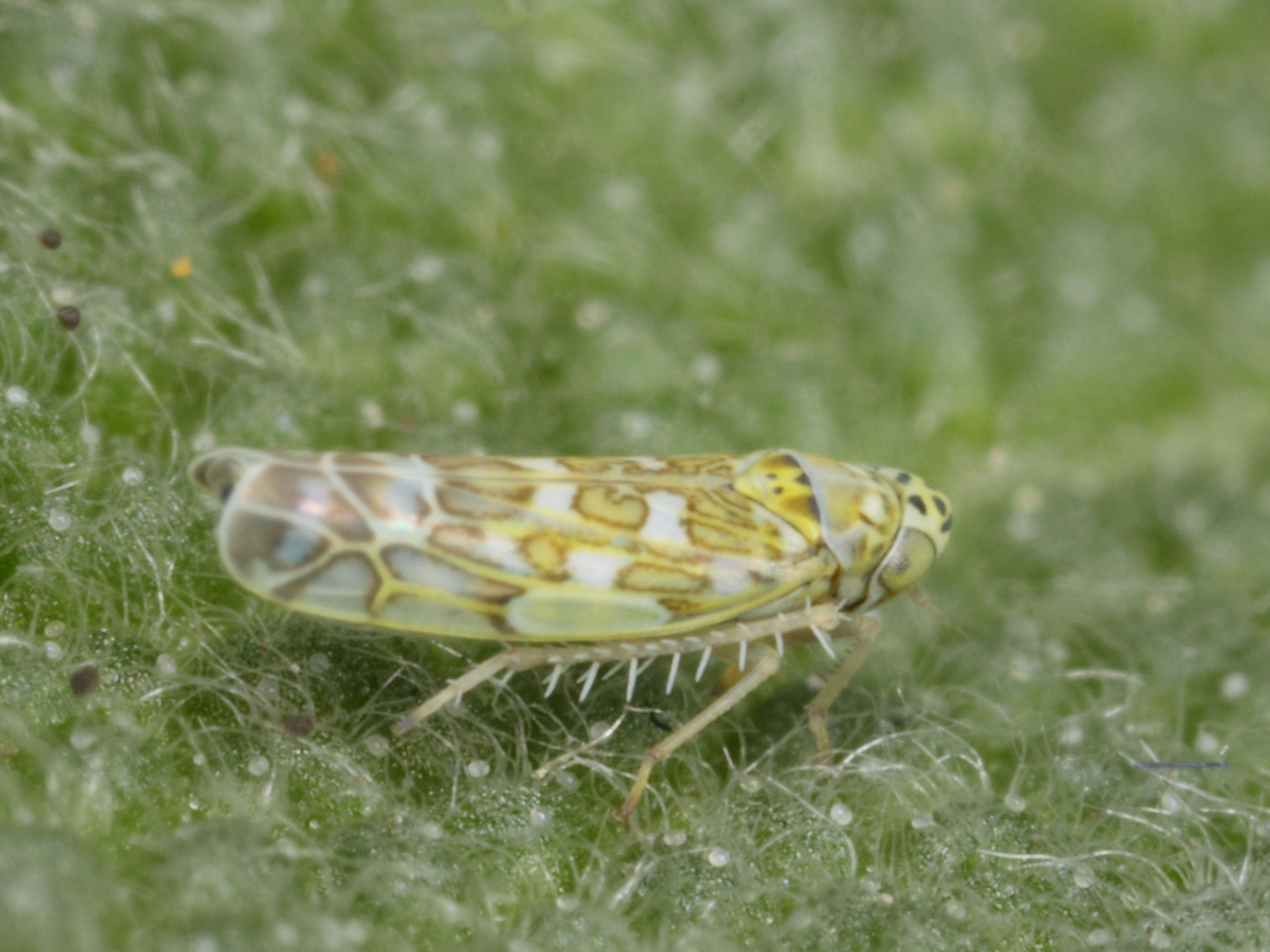

Scientific classification
- Domain: Eukaryota
- Kingdom: Animalia
- Phylum: Arthropoda
- Class: Insecta
- Order: Hemiptera
- Suborder: Auchenorrhyncha
- Family: Cicadellidae
- Genus: Eupteryx
- Species: E. melissae

Binomial name
- Eupteryx melissae Curtis, 1837

= Eupteryx melissae =

Species of true bug

Eupteryx melissae, known generally as the sage leafhopper or banded sage hopper, is a species of leafhopper in the family Cicadellidae.

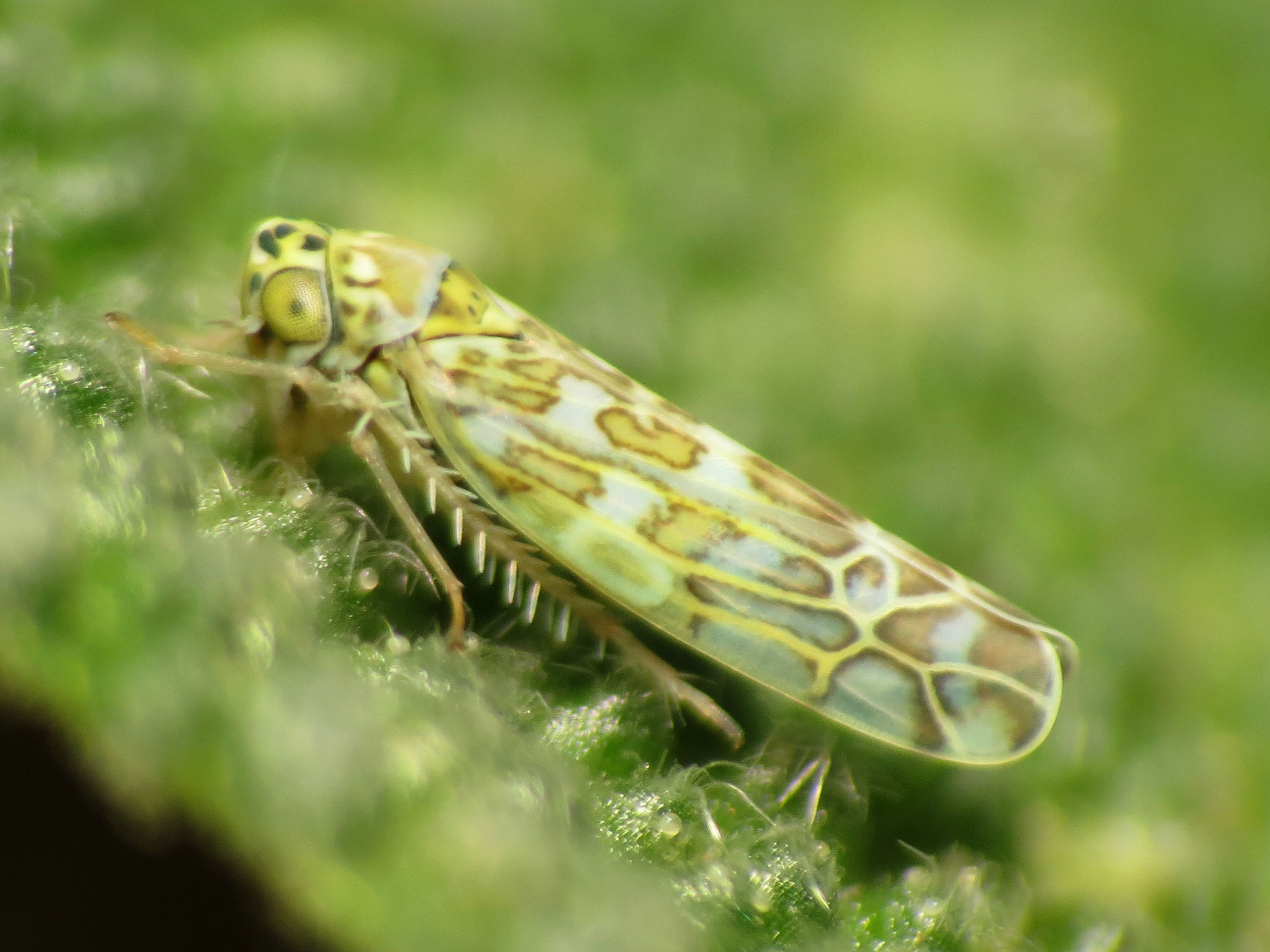
