= Sweta =

Scientific classification
- Domain: Eukaryota
- Kingdom: Animalia
- Phylum: Arthropoda
- Class: Insecta
- Order: Hemiptera
- Suborder: Auchenorrhyncha
- Family: Cicadellidae
- Tribe: Dikraneurini
- Genus: Sweta; Viraktamath & Dietrich, 2011

Species
- Sweta hallucinata; Sweta bambusana

Genus of true bugs

Sweta is a genus of leafhopper in the subfamily Typhlocybinae, with two species. The genus name is derived from the Sanskrit word for white, the type species S. hallucinata being predominantly whitish. The genus has an elongate pronotum which is unusual in Typhlocybinae and seen only in the Signoretiinae. A second species Sweta bambusana was described from China in 2012.
