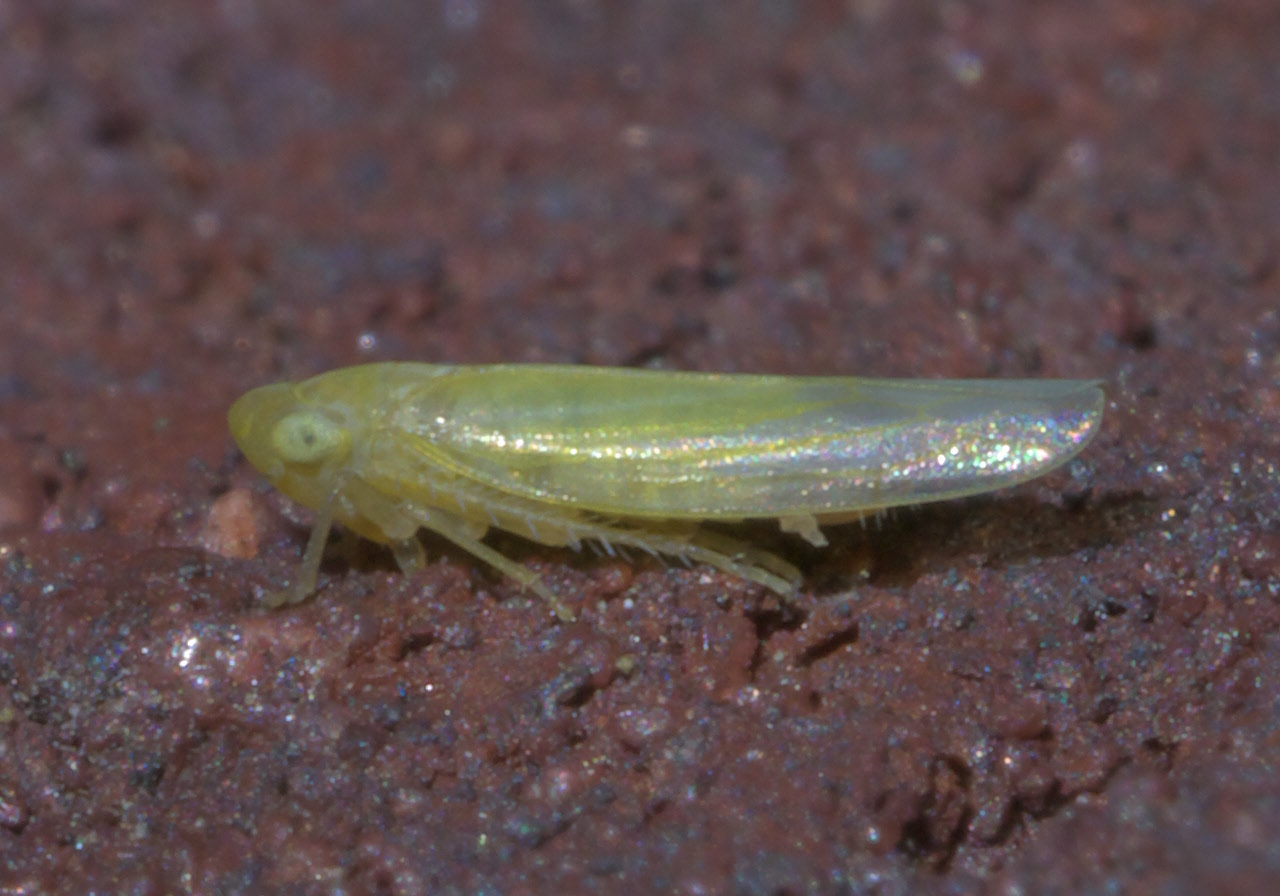

Scientific classification
- Domain: Eukaryota
- Kingdom: Animalia
- Phylum: Arthropoda
- Class: Insecta
- Order: Hemiptera
- Suborder: Auchenorrhyncha
- Family: Cicadellidae
- Genus: Forcipata
- Species: F. loca

Binomial name
- Forcipata loca DeLong & Caldwell, 1936

= Forcipata loca =

Species of true bug

Forcipata loca is a species of leafhopper in the family Cicadellidae.
