= Igutettix =

Scientific classification
- Kingdom: Animalia
- Phylum: Arthropoda
- Clade: Pancrustacea
- Class: Insecta
- Order: Hemiptera
- Suborder: Auchenorrhyncha
- Family: Cicadellidae
- Genus: Igutettix; Matsumura, 1932

Synonyms
- Vikabara Dworakowska, 1993

Genus of true bugs

Igutettix is a genus of true bugs belonging to the family Cicadellidae.

The species of this genus are found in Europe.

== Species ==
The following species are recognised in the genus Igutettix :

- Igutettix ater (Chiang, Hsu & Knight, 1990)
- Igutettix glossatus (Chiang, Hsu & Knight, 1990)
- Igutettix pulverosus (Matsumura, 1932)
