= Zonocyba =

Scientific classification
- Domain: Eukaryota
- Kingdom: Animalia
- Phylum: Arthropoda
- Class: Insecta
- Order: Hemiptera
- Suborder: Auchenorrhyncha
- Family: Cicadellidae
- Genus: Zonocyba; Vilbaste, 1982

Genus of true bugs

Zonocyba is a genus of true bugs belonging to the family Cicadellidae.

The species of this genus are found in Europe and Northern America.

Species:

- Zonocyba bifasciata (Boheman, 1851)
- Zonocyba hockingensis (Knull, 1945)
