= Wagneriala =

Scientific classification
- Domain: Eukaryota
- Kingdom: Animalia
- Phylum: Arthropoda
- Class: Insecta
- Order: Hemiptera
- Suborder: Auchenorrhyncha
- Family: Cicadellidae
- Genus: Wagneriala; Anufriev, 1970

Genus of true bugs

Wagneriala is a genus of true bugs belonging to the family Cicadellidae.

The species of this genus are found in Europe.

Species:

- Wagneriala franzi (Wagner, 1955)
- Wagneriala incisa (Then, 1897)
