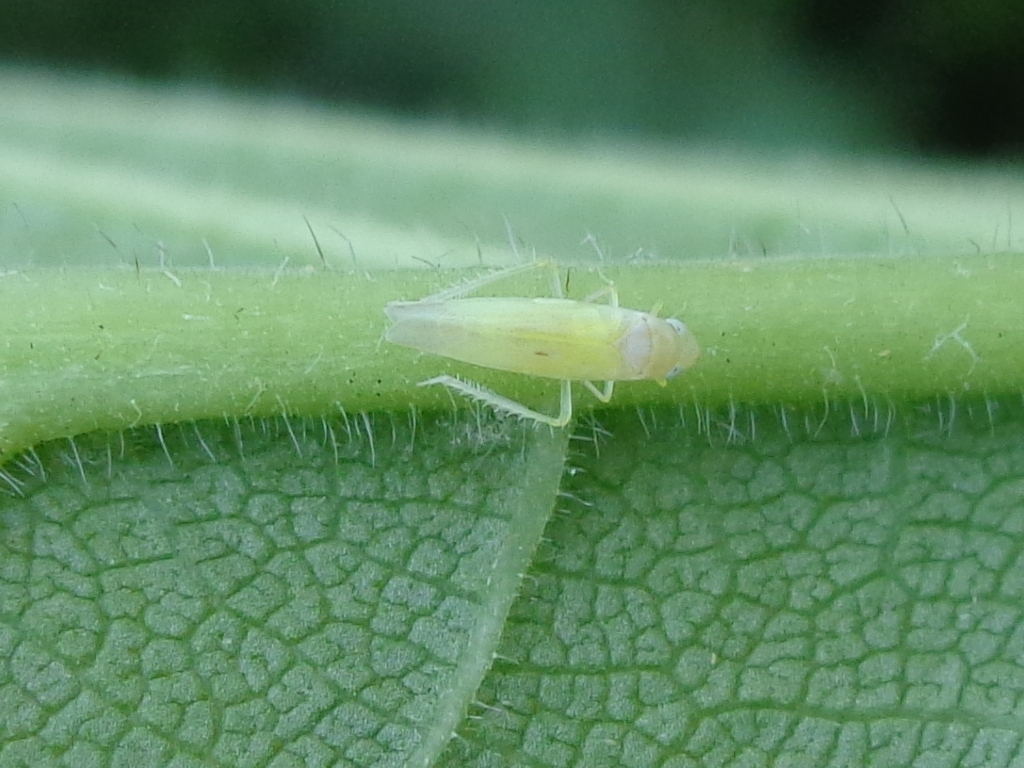

Scientific classification
- Kingdom: Animalia
- Phylum: Arthropoda
- Clade: Pancrustacea
- Class: Insecta
- Order: Hemiptera
- Suborder: Auchenorrhyncha
- Family: Cicadellidae
- Genus: Edwardsiana; Zachvatkin, 1929

= Edwardsiana =

Genus of true bugs

Edwardsiana is a genus of true bugs belonging to the family Cicadellidae.

The species of this genus are found in Europe, Australia and Northern America.

Species:

- Edwardsiana alcorni Christian, 1954
- Edwardsiana alnicola (Edwards, 1924)
- Edwardsiana curvata Oh & Jung, 2025
- Edwardsiana directa Oh & Jung, 2025
