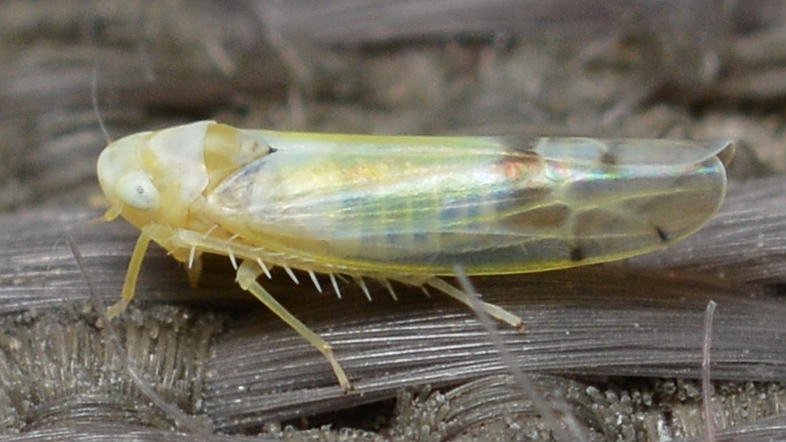
- Ribautiana sp.

Scientific classification
- Domain: Eukaryota
- Kingdom: Animalia
- Phylum: Arthropoda
- Class: Insecta
- Order: Hemiptera
- Suborder: Auchenorrhyncha
- Family: Cicadellidae
- Genus: Ribautiana; Zachvatkin, 1947

= Ribautiana =

Genus of true bugs

Ribautiana is a genus of true bugs belonging to the family Cicadellidae. The species of this genus are found in North America, Europe, and Australia.

== Species ==
The following species are recognised in the genus Ribautiana:

- Ribautiana alces (Ribaut, 1931)
- Ribautiana cruciata (Ribaut, 1931)
- Ribautiana debilis (J.W.Douglas, 1876)
- Ribautiana foliosa (Knull, 1945)
- Ribautiana luculla (Medler, 1943)
- Ribautiana multispinosa Christian, 1953
- Ribautiana ognevi (Zachvatkin, 1948)
- Ribautiana parapiscator Christian, 1953
- Ribautiana piscator (McAtee, 1926)
- Ribautiana scalaris (Ribaut, 1931)
- Ribautiana sciotoensis (Knull, 1945)
- Ribautiana tenerrima (Herrich-Schaffer, 1834)
- Ribautiana trifurcata Sharma, 1984
- Ribautiana ulmi (Linnaeus, 1758)
- Ribautiana unca (McAtee, 1926)
- BOLD:AAN8288 (Ribautiana sp.)
- BOLD:AAN8410 (Ribautiana sp.)
- BOLD:ABX7901 (Ribautiana sp.)
- BOLD:ABX9684 (Ribautiana sp.)
- BOLD:ACC7813 (Ribautiana sp.)
