= Fagocyba =

Scientific classification
- Kingdom: Animalia
- Phylum: Arthropoda
- Class: Insecta
- Order: Hemiptera
- Suborder: Auchenorrhyncha
- Family: Cicadellidae
- Genus: Fagocyba; Dlabola, 1958

Genus of true bugs

Fagocyba is a genus of true bugs belonging to the family Cicadellidae.

The species of this genus are found in Europe and Northern America.

Species:

- Fagocyba alnisuga Arzone, 1976
- Fagocyba carri (Edwards, 1914)
