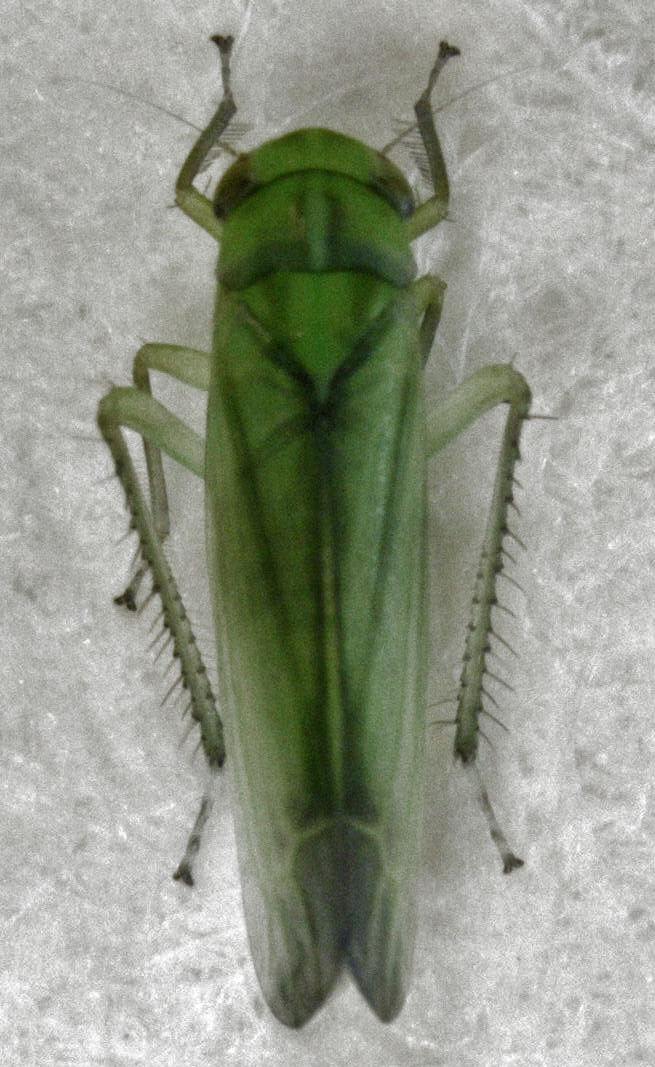
- Female specie

Scientific classification
- Domain: Eukaryota
- Kingdom: Animalia
- Phylum: Arthropoda
- Class: Insecta
- Order: Hemiptera
- Suborder: Auchenorrhyncha
- Family: Cicadellidae
- Genus: Kybos; Fieber, 1866

= Kybos =

Genus of true bugs

Kybos is a genus of true bugs belonging to the family Cicadellidae.

The species of this genus are found in Europe, New Zealand and Northern America.

Species:

- Kybos abnormis (Datta & Ghosh, 1973)
- Kybos abstrusus (Linnavuori, 1949)
