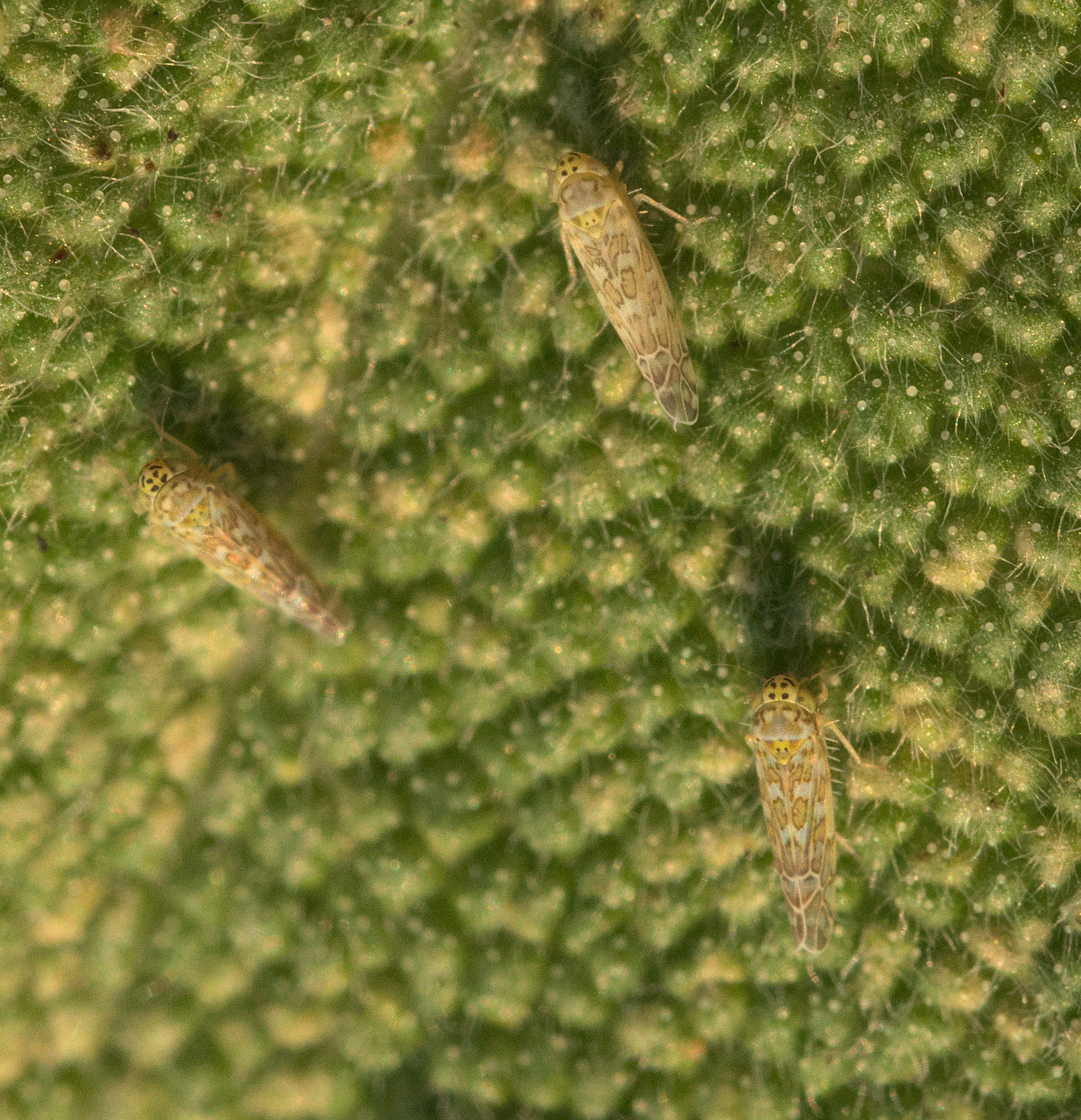
- Eupteryx decemnotata

Scientific classification
- Kingdom: Animalia
- Phylum: Arthropoda
- Class: Insecta
- Order: Hemiptera
- Suborder: Auchenorrhyncha
- Family: Cicadellidae
- Subtribe: Eupterygina
- Genus: Eupteryx; Curtis, 1833

= Eupteryx =

Genus of true bugs

Eupteryx is a genus of leafhoppers in the family Cicadellidae.

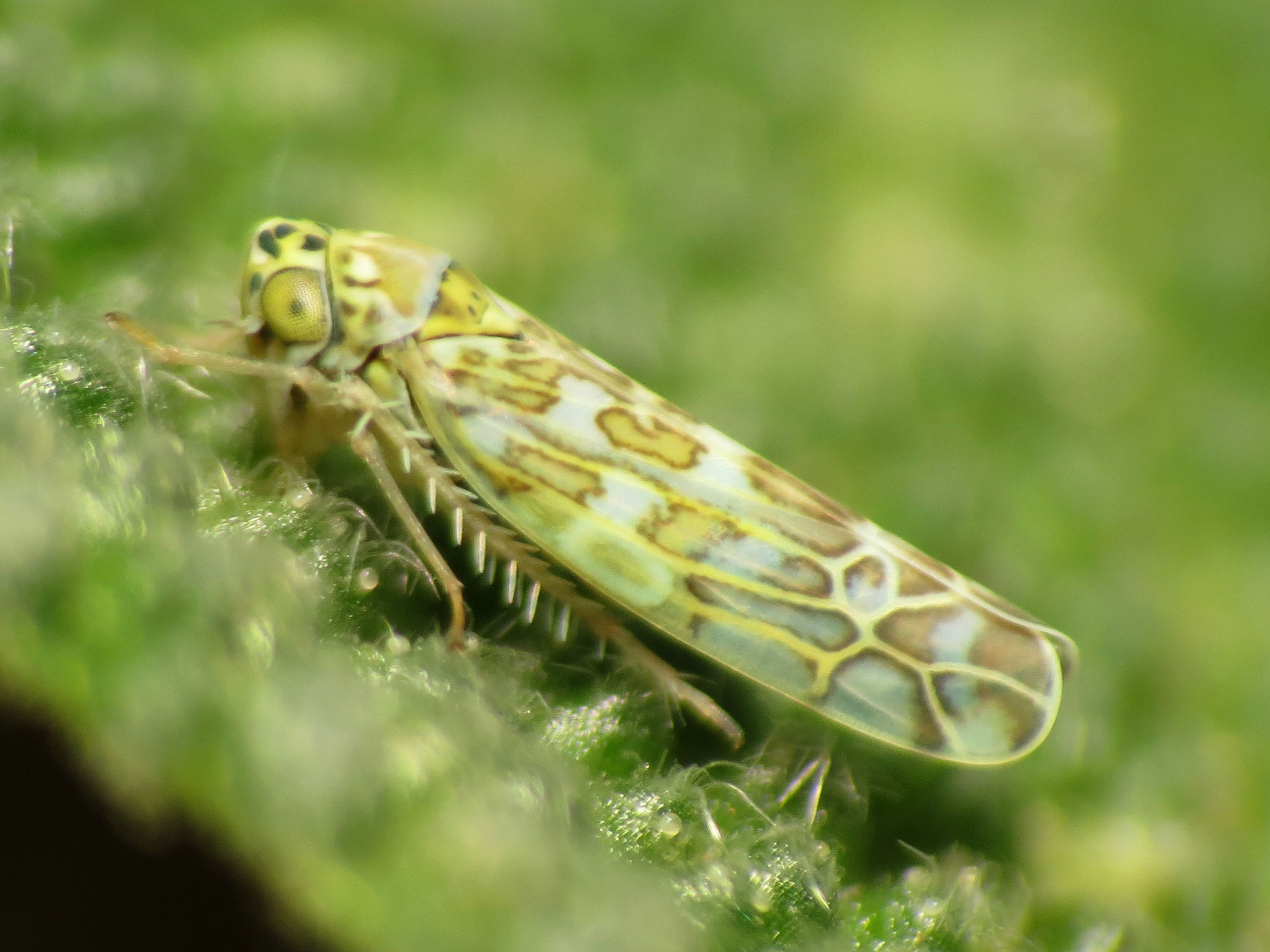
Eupteryx melissae

== Species ==
Species of Eupteryx include the following:

- Eupteryx abzaga Dlabola, 1965
- Eupteryx adornata Mitjaev, 1998
- Eupteryx adspersa (Herrich-Schäffer, 1838)
- Eupteryx agatkae Dworakowska, 1970
- Eupteryx ahmedi Dworakowska, 1982
- Eupteryx albonigra Dworakowska, 1994
- Eupteryx alticola Ribaut, 1936
- Eupteryx andalusiaca Ferrari, 1882
- Eupteryx arta Dworakowska, 1971
- Eupteryx assectator Logvinenko, 1966
- Eupteryx atropunctata (Goeze, 1778)
- Eupteryx aurata (Linnaeus, 1758)
- Eupteryx australis Heller & Linnavuori, 1968
- Eupteryx austriaca (Metcalf, 1968)
- Eupteryx azorica Ribaut, 1941
- Eupteryx bharatiae Dworakowska, 1980
- Eupteryx brachycephala Dworakowska, 1979
- Eupteryx calcarata Ossiannilsson, 1936
- Eupteryx capreolus Lindberg, 1954
- Eupteryx castelvecchica Dlabola, 1967
- Eupteryx castelvecchius Dlabola, 1967
- Eupteryx certa Logvinenko, 1978
- Eupteryx clavalis McAtee, 1919
- Eupteryx collina (Flor, 1861)
- Eupteryx confusa Dworakowska, 1979
- Eupteryx contaminata Melichar, 1896
- Eupteryx corsica Lethierry, 1876
- Eupteryx cristagalli Dworakowska, 1969
- Eupteryx curtisii (Flor, 1861)
- Eupteryx cyclops Matsumura, 1906
- Eupteryx cypria (Ribaut, 1948)
- Eupteryx cytinsularis Guglielmino, Lauterer & Bückle, 2011
- Eupteryx decemnotata Rey, 1891 (ligurian leafhopper)
- Eupteryx demessa Dlabola, 1963
- Eupteryx divulsa Guglielmino & Bückle, 2014
- Eupteryx dlabolai Dmitriev & McKamey, 2013
- Eupteryx dworakowskae Dlabola, 1981
- Eupteryx egregia Logvinenko, 1981
- Eupteryx ethiopica Dworakowska, 1971
- Eupteryx fahringeri Melichar, 1911
- Eupteryx falculata Ribaut, 1936
- Eupteryx fastuosa Logvinenko, 1978
- Eupteryx filicum (Newman, 1853)
- Eupteryx flavoguttata Heller & Linnavuori, 1968
- Eupteryx flavoscuta Gillette, 1898
- Eupteryx florida Ribaut, 1936
- Eupteryx formaster Logvinenko, 1966
- Eupteryx furcata (Beamer, 1943)
- Eupteryx gafsica Dlabola, 1967
- Eupteryx genestieri Meusnier, 1982
- Eupteryx gilva Mitjaev, 1998
- Eupteryx gracilirama Hou, Zhang & Huang, 2016
- Eupteryx gravesteini Dlabola, 1974
- Eupteryx gyaurdagica Dlabola, 1957
- Eupteryx hela Dworakowska, 1982
- Eupteryx heydenii (Kirschbaum, 1868)
- Eupteryx ichnusae Poggi, 2012
- Eupteryx immaculatifrons (Kirschbaum, 1868)
- Eupteryx insulana (Ribaut, 1948)
- Eupteryx iranica Linnavuori, 1953
- Eupteryx irminae Dworakowska, 1969
- Eupteryx janeki Dworakowska, 1969
- Eupteryx kaghanensis Ahmed, 1969
- Eupteryx kama Dworakowska, 1979
- Eupteryx kufensis Linnavuori, 1965
- Eupteryx lautereri Mühlethaler & Gnezdilov, 2013
- Eupteryx lelievrei (Lethierry, 1874)
- Eupteryx logvinenkoae Mühlethaler & Gnezdilov, 2013
- Eupteryx longicephala Dworakowska, 1979
- Eupteryx maigudoi Dworakowska, 1971
- Eupteryx maruta Dworakowska, 1971
- Eupteryx melanocephala Melichar, 1902
- Eupteryx melissae Curtis, 1837 (sage leafhopper)
- Eupteryx minuscula Lindberg, 1929
- Eupteryx minuta Bervoets, 1910
- Eupteryx miranda Logvinenko, 1978
- Eupteryx mroczkowskii Dworakowska, 1971
- Eupteryx multifaciata Singh, 1969
- Eupteryx nemoricola Linnavuori, 1962
- Eupteryx nigra Osborn, 1905
- Eupteryx notata Curtis, 1837
- Eupteryx occidentalis Dworakowska, 1976
- Eupteryx omani Christian, 1956
- Eupteryx orientalis Linnavuori, 1953
- Eupteryx origani Zachvatkin, 1948
- Eupteryx oscorum Guglielmino & Bückle, 2014
- Eupteryx parasensis Samad & Ahmed, 1979
- Eupteryx pavlovskii Zachvatkin, 1947
- Eupteryx pentavittata Hu & Kuoh, 1991
- Eupteryx petasilidis Ferrari, 1882
- Eupteryx praestabilis Logvinenko, 1966
- Eupteryx principalis Zachvatkin, 1953
- Eupteryx punctoatrata Dworakowska, 1971
- Eupteryx raczka Dworakowska, 1994
- Eupteryx ratara Dworakowska, 1971
- Eupteryx ribauti Dworakowska, 1972
- Eupteryx rostrata Ribaut, 1936
- Eupteryx rotumba Dworakowska, 1971
- Eupteryx salviae Arzone & Vidano, 1994
- Eupteryx schuleri Ribaut, 1952
- Eupteryx seiugata Dlabola, 1967
- Eupteryx semipunctata (Fieber, 1884)
- Eupteryx signatipennis (Boheman, 1847)
- Eupteryx sikkimensis Dworakowska, 1994
- Eupteryx stachydearum (Hardy, 1850)
- Eupteryx stachydis Logvinenko, 1967
- Eupteryx stacla Dworakowska, 1979
- Eupteryx taborskyi Dlabola, 1957
- Eupteryx talassica Mitjaev, 1971
- Eupteryx tamindanica Dlabola, 1981
- Eupteryx tarama Dworakowska, 1971
- Eupteryx tenella (Fallén, 1806)
- Eupteryx thoulessi Edwards, 1926
- Eupteryx tuberculata Samad & Ahmed, 1979
- Eupteryx turomba Dworakowska, 1971
- Eupteryx undomarginata Lindberg, 1929
- Eupteryx urticae (Fabricius, 1803)
- Eupteryx vanduzei Gillette, 1898
- Eupteryx vera Logvinenko, 1981
- Eupteryx vicaria Linnavuori, 1968
- Eupteryx vittata (Linnaeus, 1758)
- Eupteryx zelleri (Kirschbaum, 1868)
- Eupteryx zova Dworakowska, 1979
- Eupteryx zyluki Dworakowska, 1971
