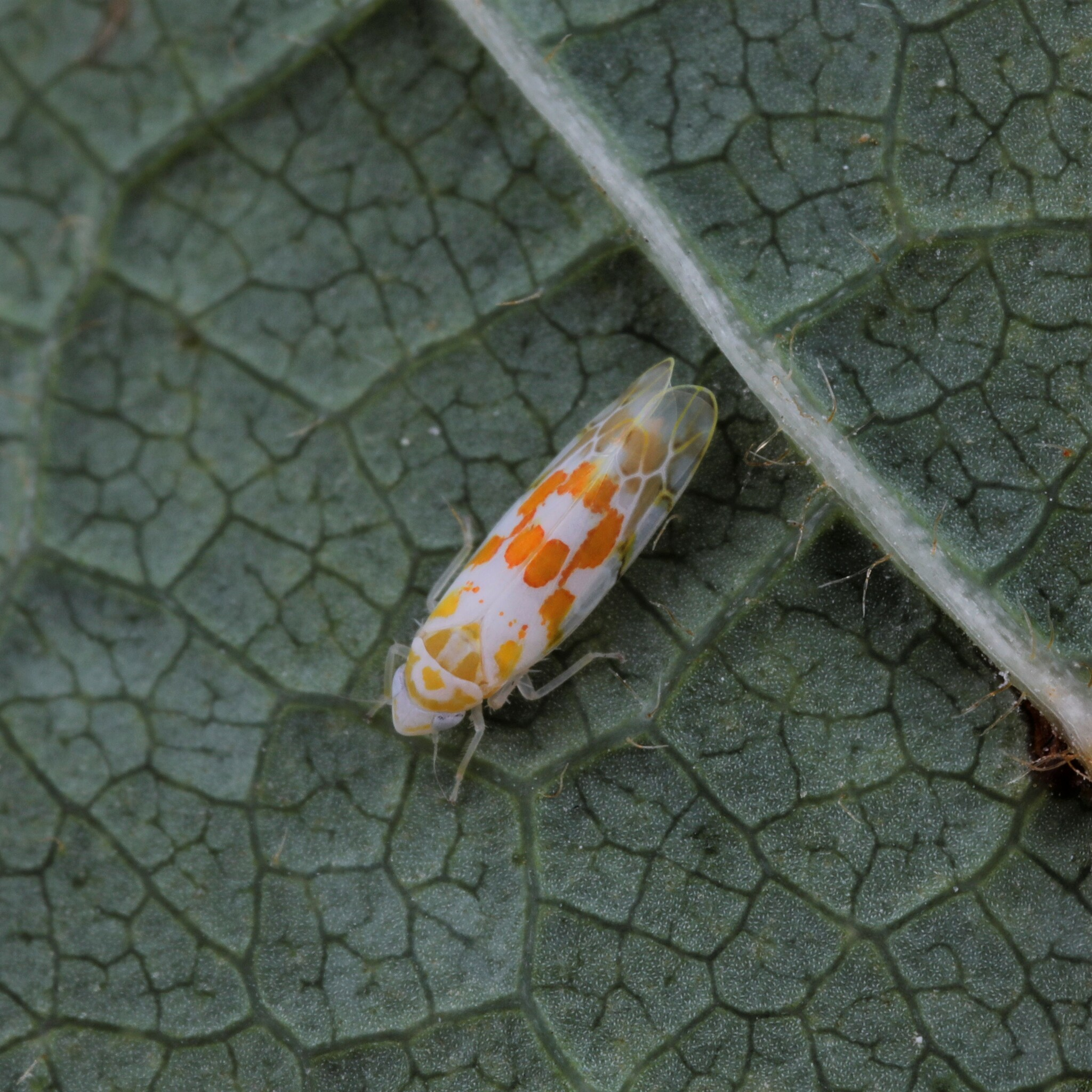
- Typhlocyba quercus

Scientific classification
- Kingdom: Animalia
- Phylum: Arthropoda
- Class: Insecta
- Order: Hemiptera
- Suborder: Auchenorrhyncha
- Family: Cicadellidae
- Subfamily: Typhlocybinae; Kirschbaum, 1868

Tribes
- 4-10, see text

= Typhlocybinae =

Subfamily of leafhoppers

Typhlocybinae is a subfamily of insects in the leafhopper family, Cicadellidae. This is currently the second largest leafhopper subfamily based on the number of described species, but researchers believe there are so many taxa yet undescribed that it is probably the largest subfamily. Approximately 6000 species have been described thus far.

Typhlocybinae belongs to the second-largest subfamily of leafhoppers, with >6,000 described extant species placed in ~300 genera and five tribes.

Many species of the subfamily Typhlocybinae are major pests of crops, such as cotton, grape, and eggplant, by direct or indirect damage (Oman, 1949, Vidano, 1962, Nielson, 1968, Zhang, 1990, Qin and Zhang, 2008).

== Tribes ==
Entomologists divide the subfamily into four to ten tribes. Five tribes are generally accepted:

- Alebrini
- Dikraneurini
- Empoascini
- Erythroneurini
- Typhlocybini

== Selected genera ==
- Alebra
- Dikrella
- Dziwneono
- Empoasca
- Erasmoneura Young, 1952
- Eupteryx
- Jacobiasca
- Sweta Viraktamath & Dietrich, 2011
- Typhlocyba Germar, 1833 - type genus

== Gallery ==
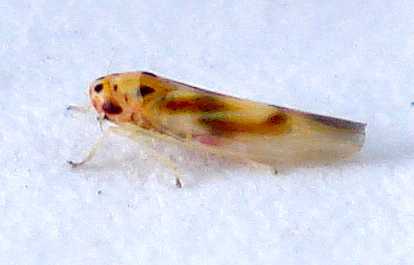
Arboridia ribauti

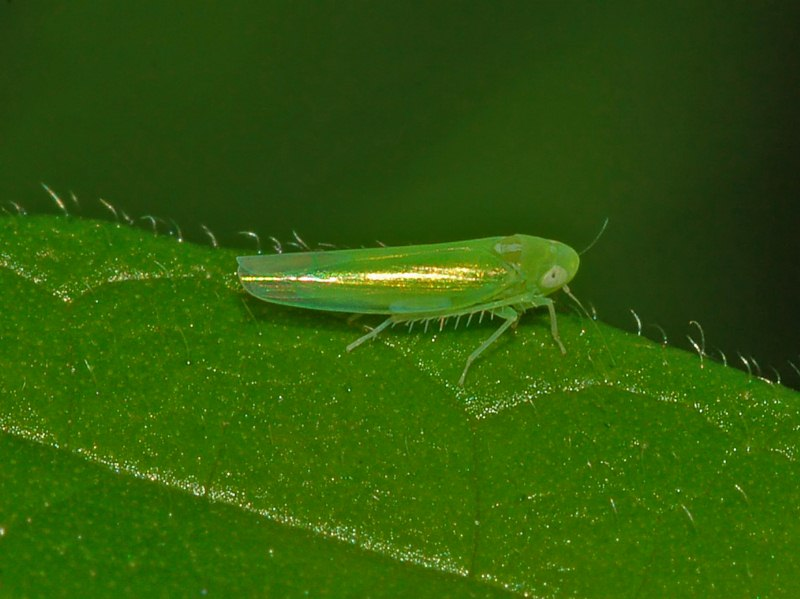
Empoasca decipiens

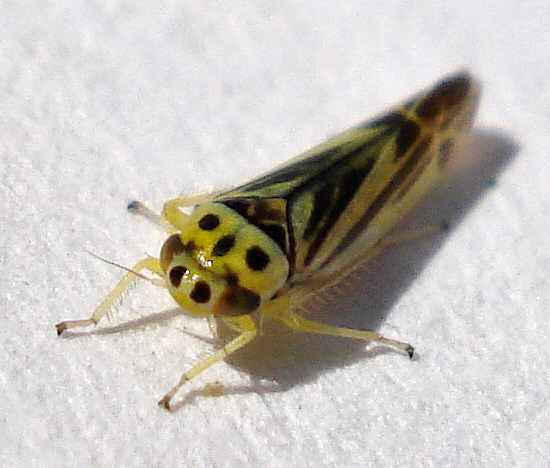
Eupterycyba jucunda

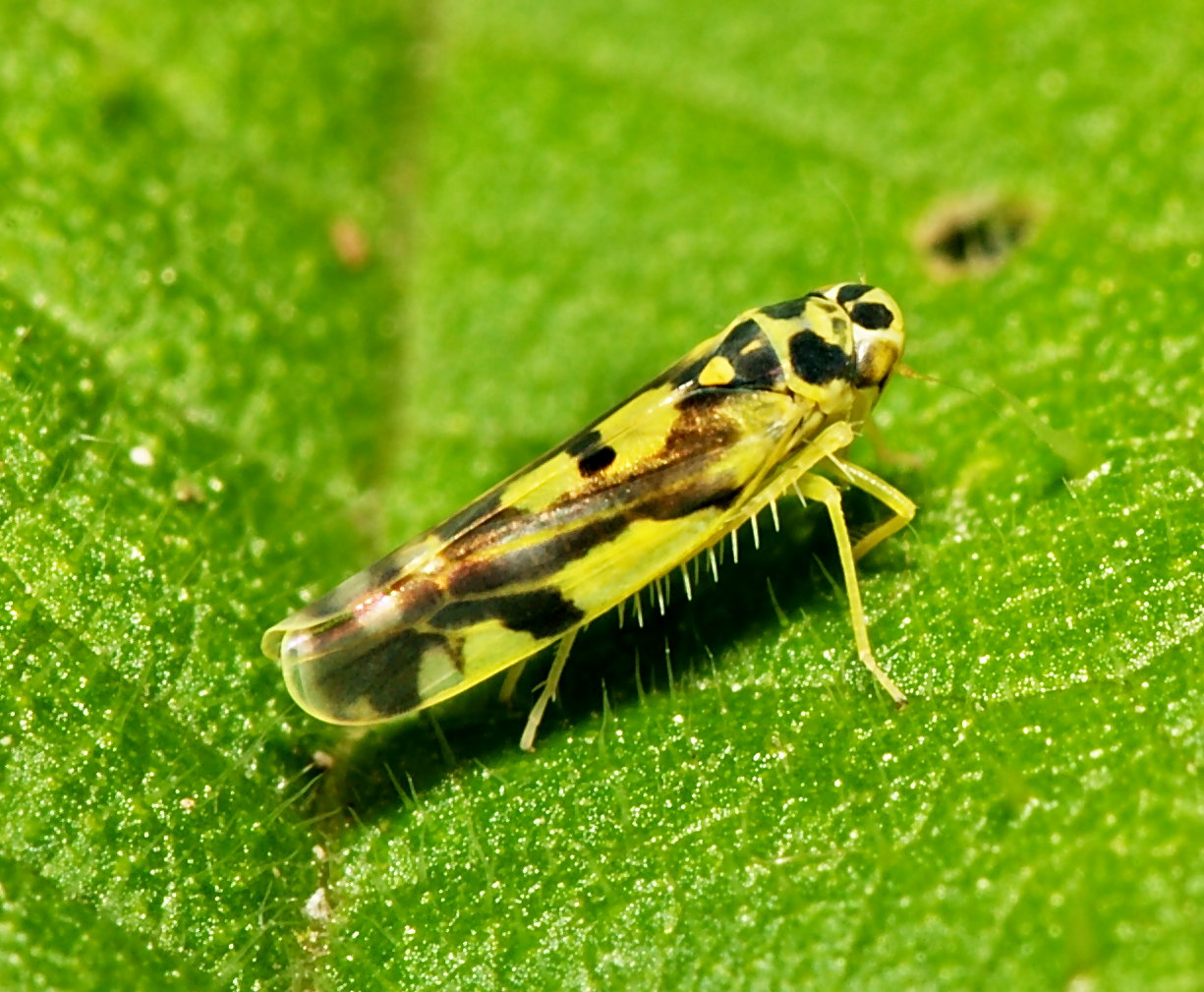
Eupteryx aurata

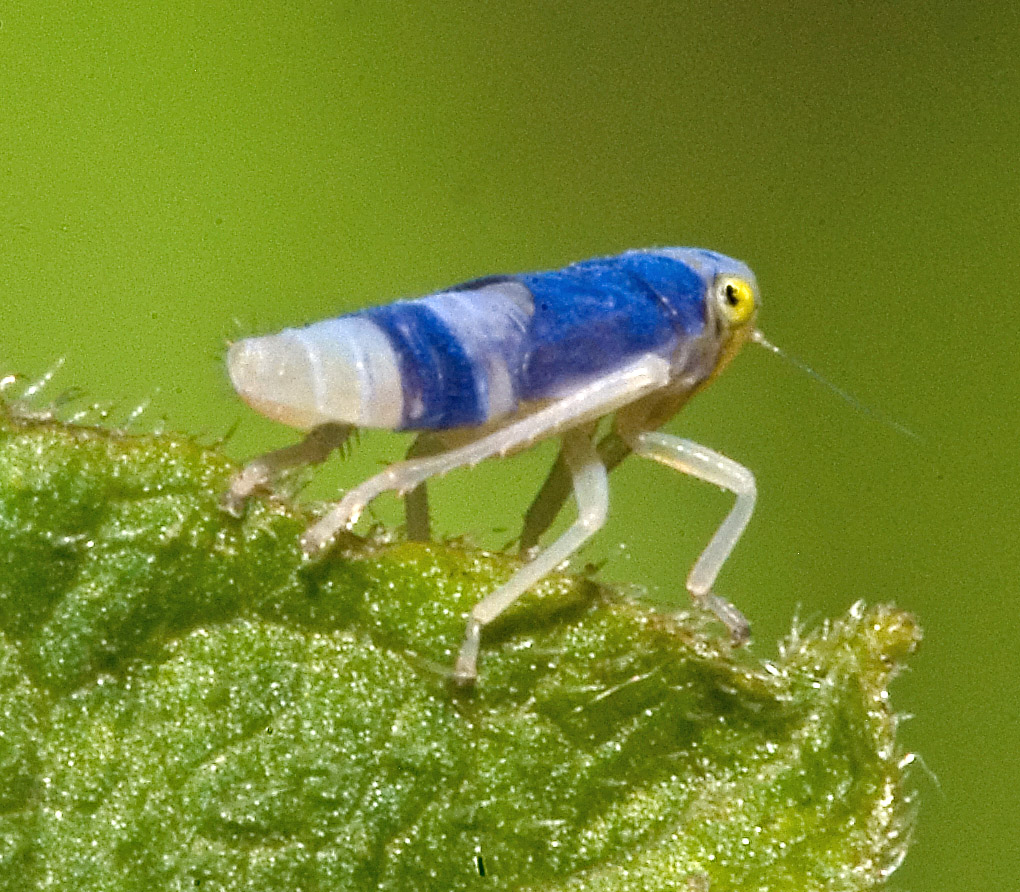
Nymph of an unidentified typhlocybine
