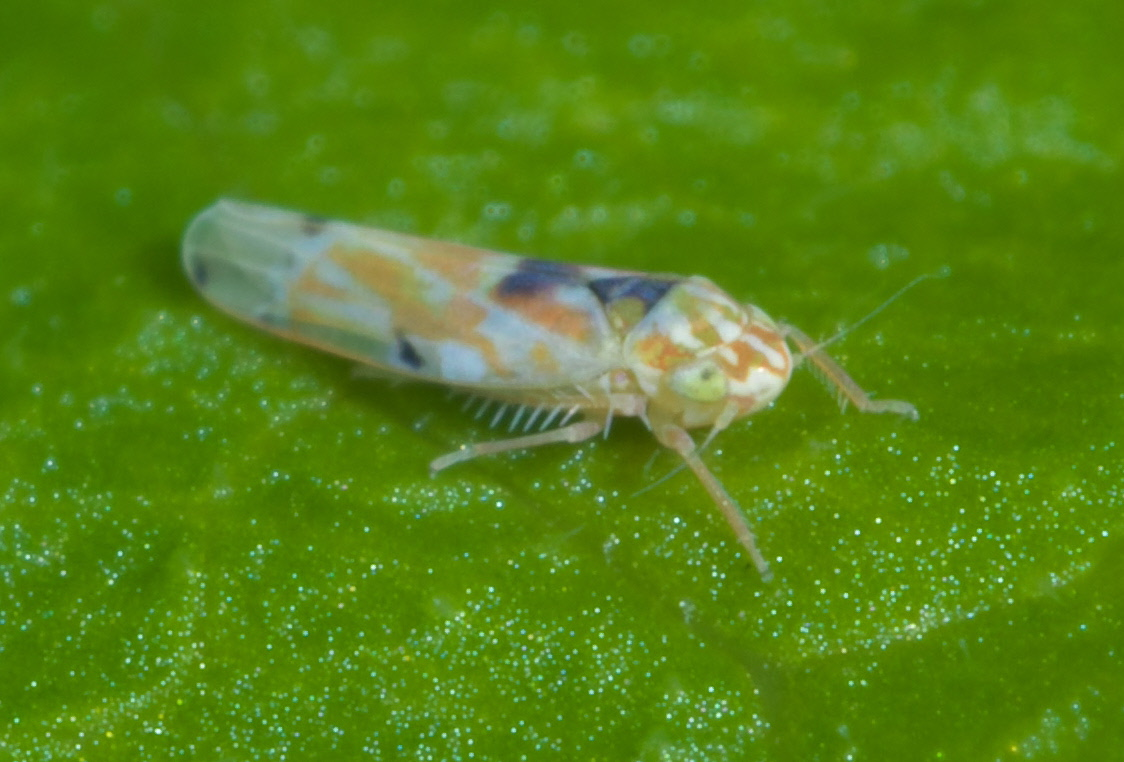

Scientific classification
- Domain: Eukaryota
- Kingdom: Animalia
- Phylum: Arthropoda
- Class: Insecta
- Order: Hemiptera
- Suborder: Auchenorrhyncha
- Family: Cicadellidae
- Genus: Erythroneura
- Species: E. octonotata

Binomial name
- Erythroneura octonotata Walsh, 1862

= Erythroneura octonotata =

Species of true bug

Erythroneura octonotata, the eight-spotted leafhopper, is a species of leafhopper in the family Cicadellidae.

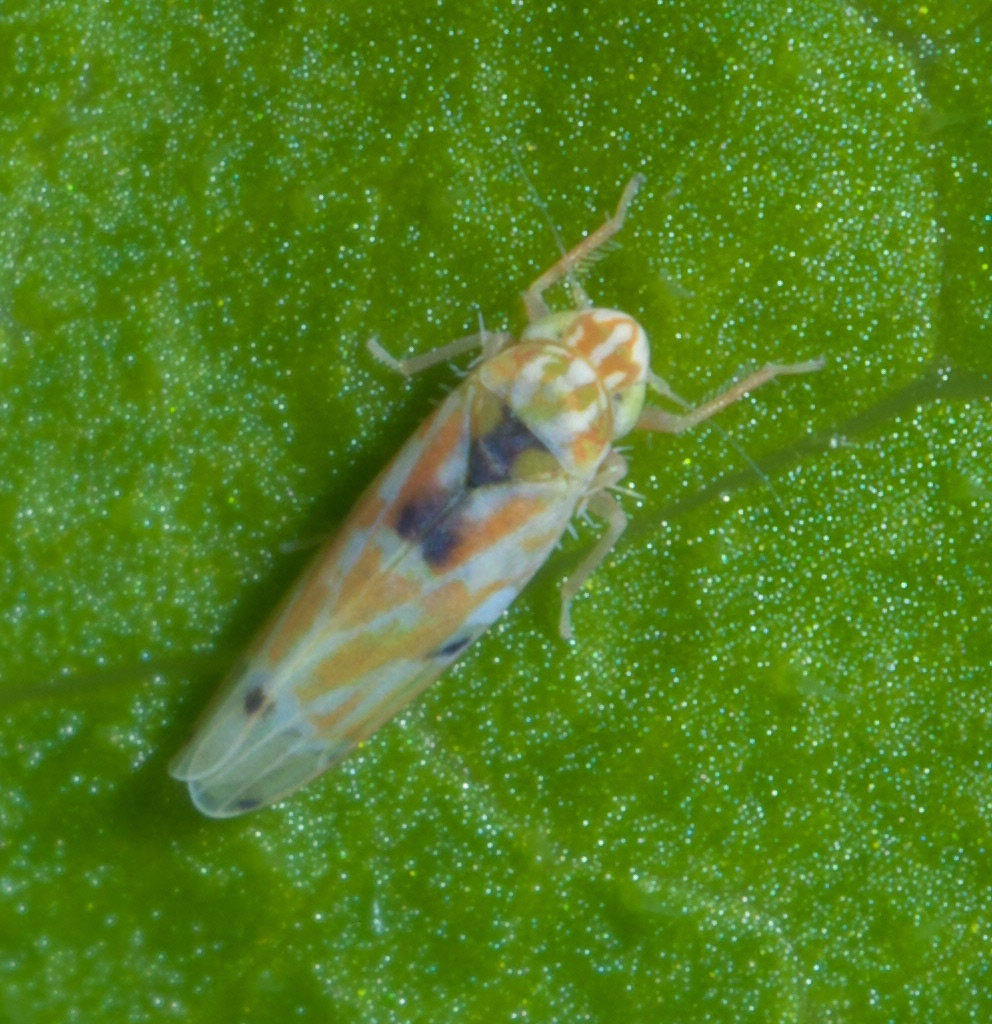
Eight-spotted leafhopper, Erythroneura octonotata
