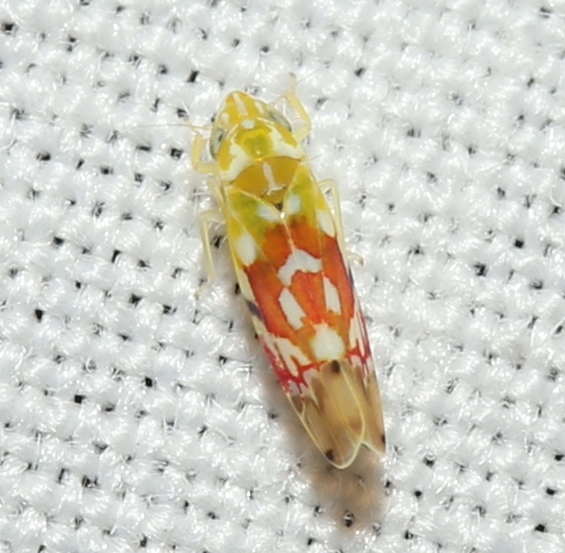

Scientific classification
- Kingdom: Animalia
- Phylum: Arthropoda
- Class: Insecta
- Order: Hemiptera
- Suborder: Auchenorrhyncha
- Family: Cicadellidae
- Genus: Erythroneura
- Species: E. reflecta

Binomial name
- Erythroneura reflecta McAtee, 1924

= Erythroneura reflecta =

Species of true bug

Erythroneura reflecta is a species of leafhopper found in the Eastern United States. It is most common in Illinois and Ohio. They can be found on Vitis riparia (river bank grape), other wild grapes, fruit trees in the genus Prunus, as well as trees and shrubs in the genus Aesculus. They are 3 mm (0.12 in) in length, and can be quite colorful. Some are mostly white, with a few dull colors, but some can be yellow, orange, blue, brown, and red.
