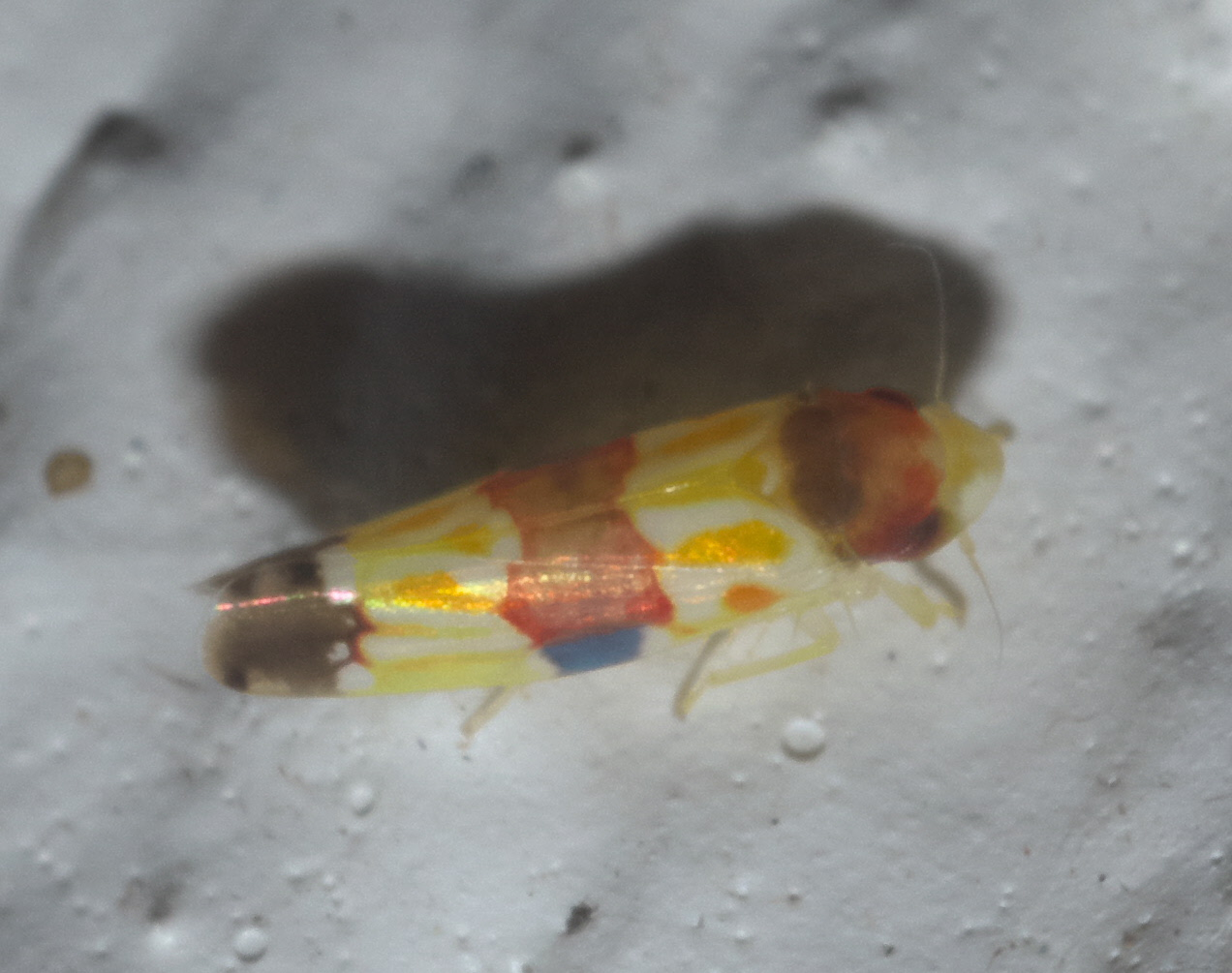

Scientific classification
- Domain: Eukaryota
- Kingdom: Animalia
- Phylum: Arthropoda
- Class: Insecta
- Order: Hemiptera
- Suborder: Auchenorrhyncha
- Family: Cicadellidae
- Genus: Erythroneura
- Species: E. diva

Binomial name
- Erythroneura diva McAtee, 1920

= Erythroneura diva =

Species of true bug

Erythroneura diva is a species of leafhopper in the family Cicadellidae.
