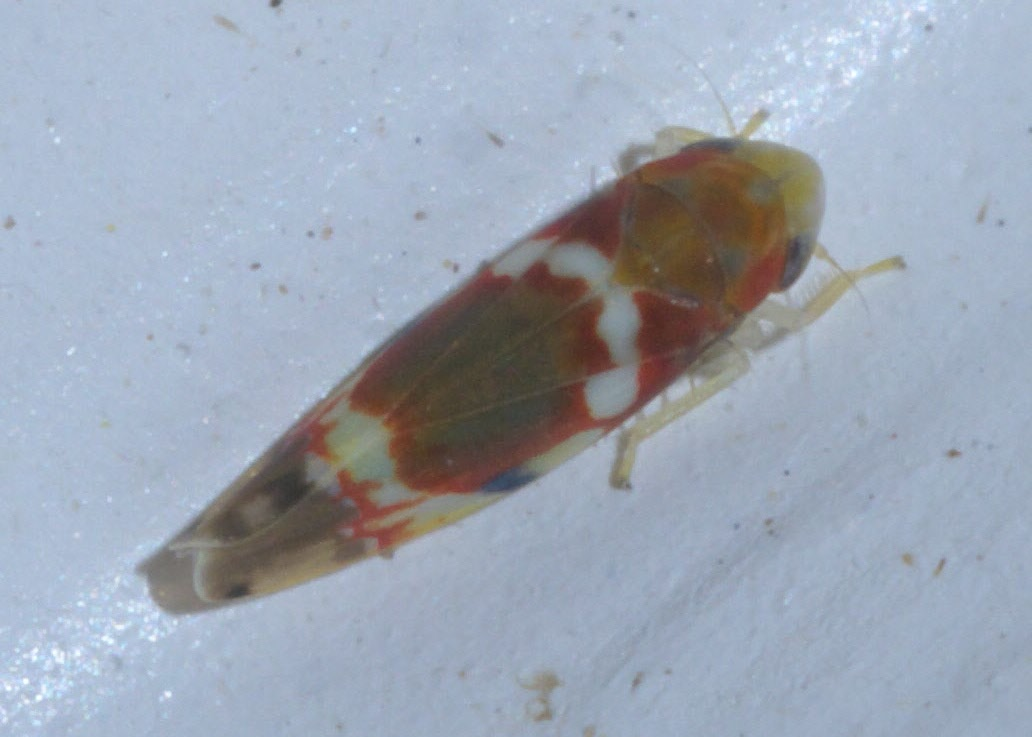

Scientific classification
- Domain: Eukaryota
- Kingdom: Animalia
- Phylum: Arthropoda
- Class: Insecta
- Order: Hemiptera
- Suborder: Auchenorrhyncha
- Family: Cicadellidae
- Genus: Erythroneura
- Species: E. vitis

Binomial name
- Erythroneura vitis (Harris, 1831)

= Erythroneura vitis =

Species of true bug

Erythroneura vitis, the grapevine leafhopper, is a species of leafhopper in the family Cicadellidae.

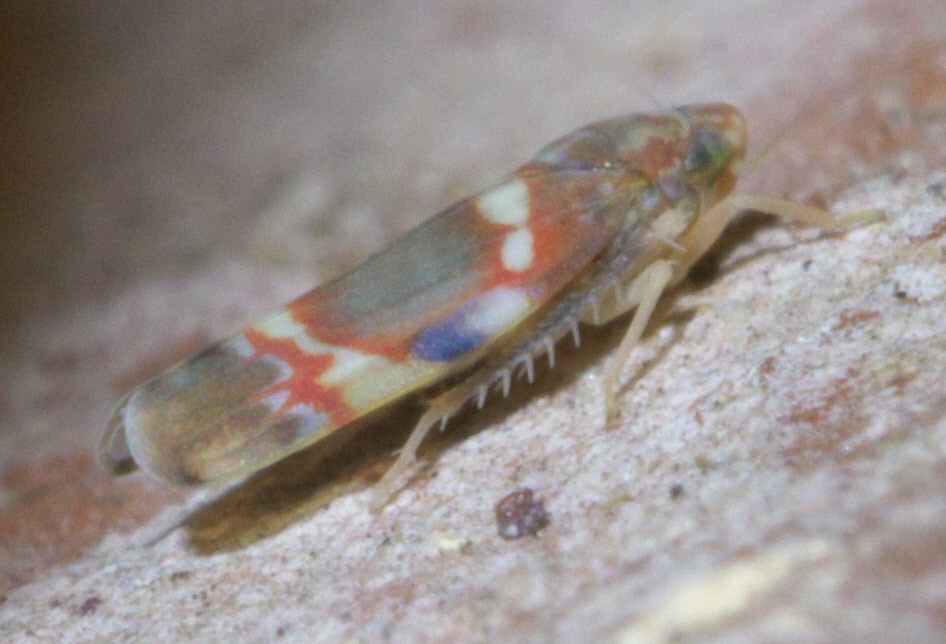
Grapevine leafhopper, Erythroneura vitis
