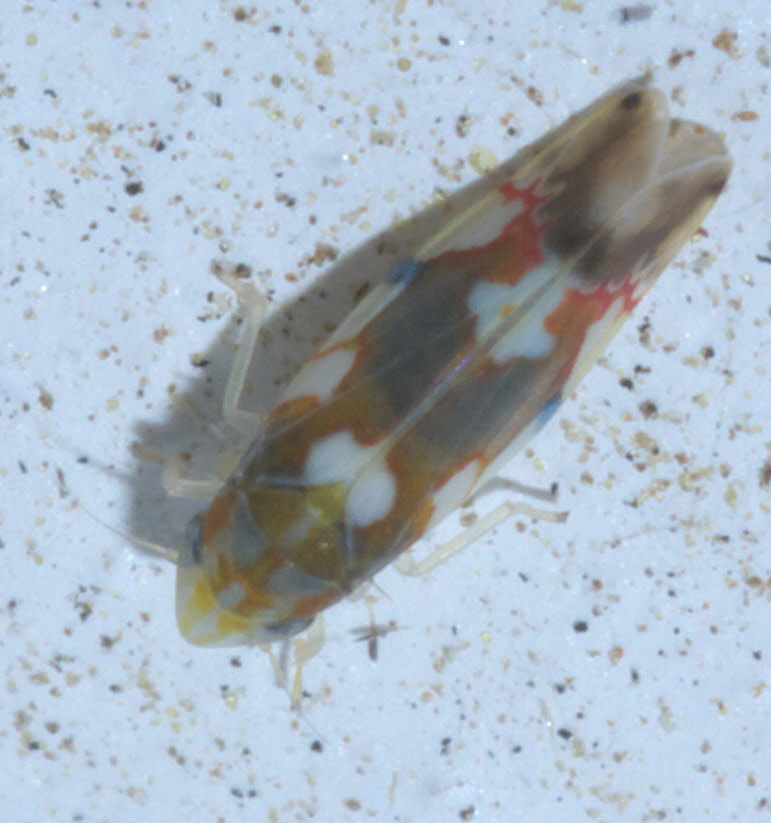

Scientific classification
- Domain: Eukaryota
- Kingdom: Animalia
- Phylum: Arthropoda
- Class: Insecta
- Order: Hemiptera
- Suborder: Auchenorrhyncha
- Family: Cicadellidae
- Genus: Erythroneura
- Species: E. elegans

Binomial name
- Erythroneura elegans McAtee, 1920

= Erythroneura elegans =

Species of true bug

Erythroneura elegans is a species of leafhopper in the family Cicadellidae.

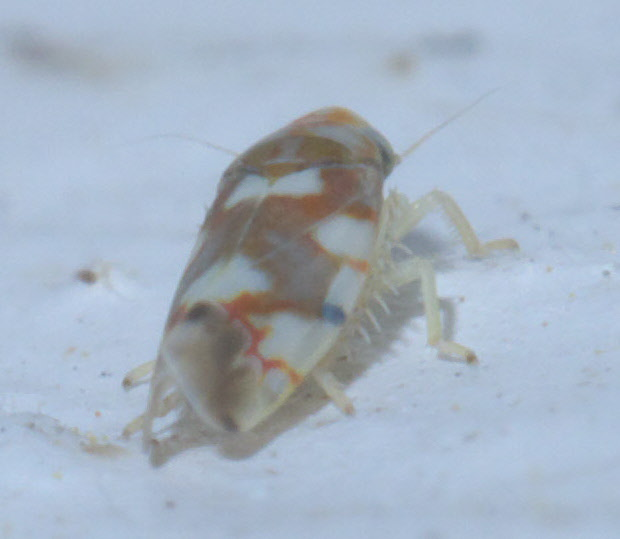

The eggs of Erythroneura elegans may be parasitized by Anagrus epos, a species of fairyfly.
