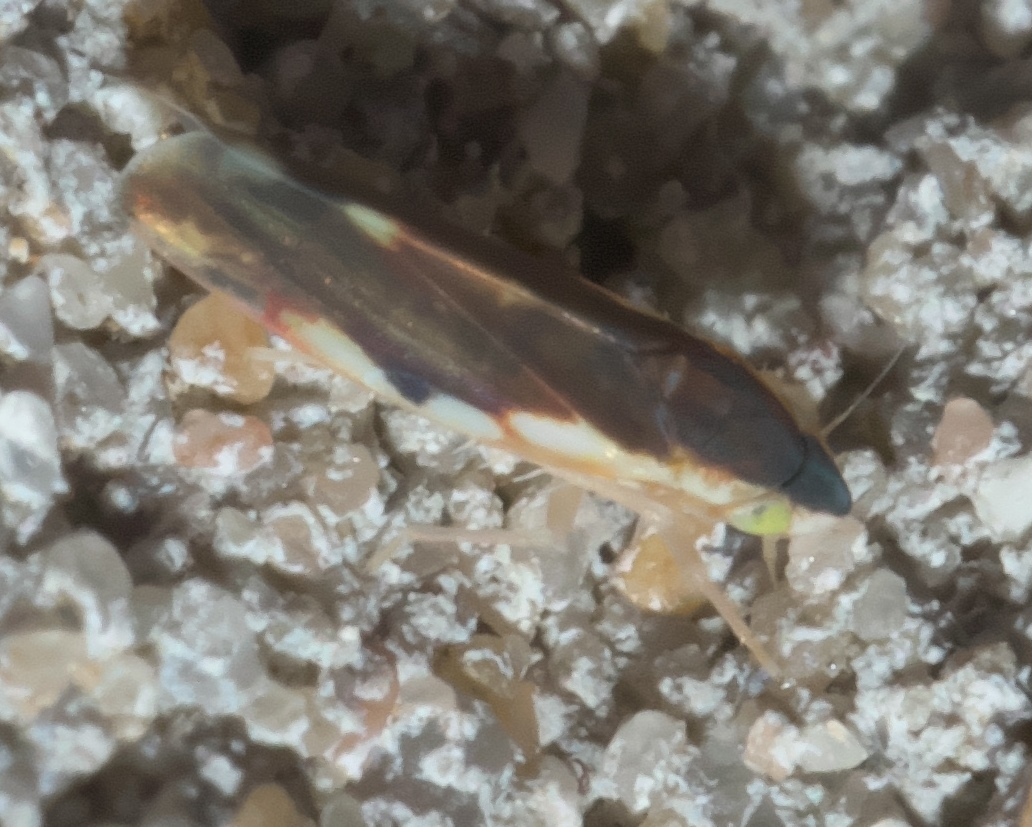

Scientific classification
- Domain: Eukaryota
- Kingdom: Animalia
- Phylum: Arthropoda
- Class: Insecta
- Order: Hemiptera
- Suborder: Auchenorrhyncha
- Family: Cicadellidae
- Genus: Erythroneura
- Species: E. aclys

Binomial name
- Erythroneura aclys McAtee, 1920

= Erythroneura aclys =

Species of true bug

Erythroneura aclys is a species of leafhopper in the family Cicadellidae.

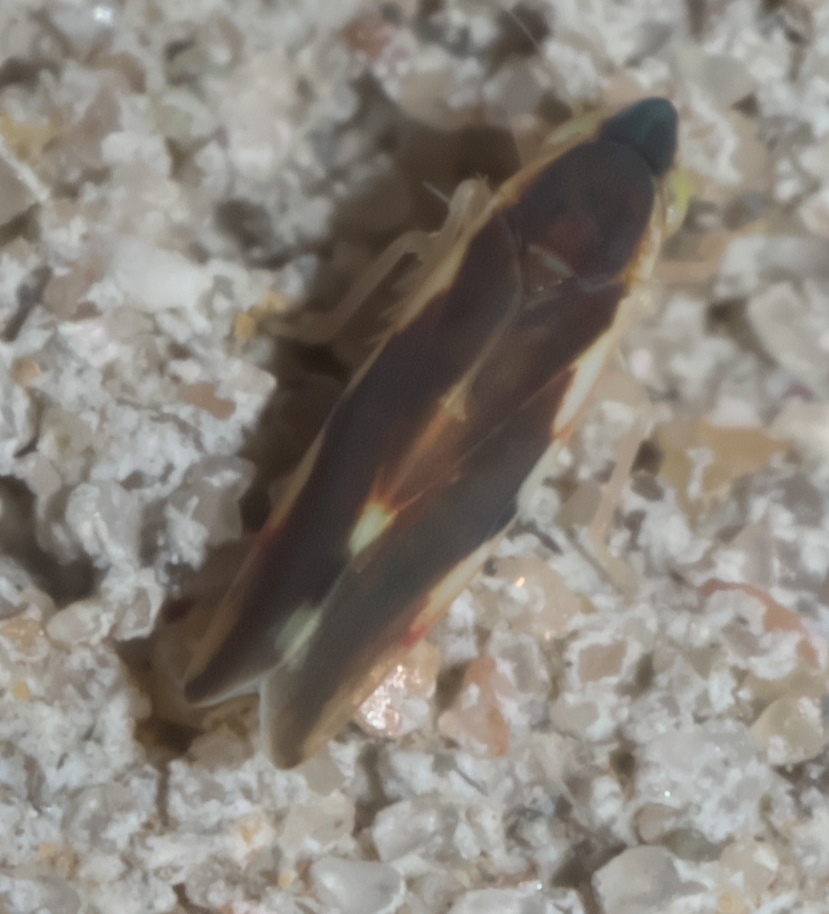
