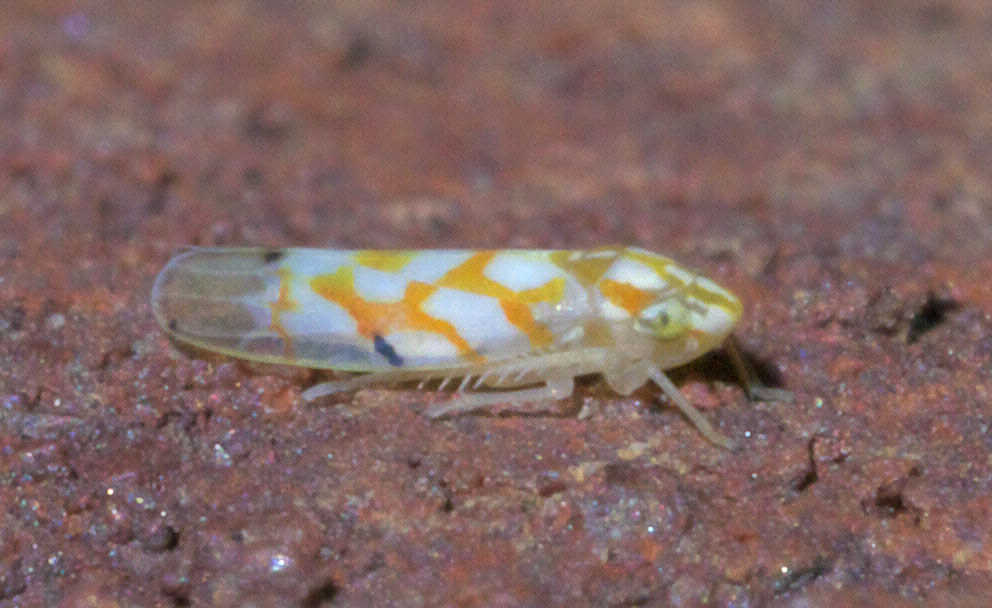

Scientific classification
- Domain: Eukaryota
- Kingdom: Animalia
- Phylum: Arthropoda
- Class: Insecta
- Order: Hemiptera
- Suborder: Auchenorrhyncha
- Family: Cicadellidae
- Genus: Erythroneura; Fitch, 1851

Species
- See text

= Erythroneura =

Genus of true bugs

Erythroneura is a genus of leafhoppers in the family Cicadellidae.

== Species ==
The following 79 species are recognised in the genus Erythroneura:

- Erythroneura aclys
- Erythroneura acuticephala
- Erythroneura amanda
- Erythroneura ancora
- Erythroneura anfracta
- Erythroneura ariadne
- Erythroneura atropictila
- Erythroneura aza
- Erythroneura bakeri
- Erythroneura beameri
- Erythroneura bidens
- Erythroneura bistrata
- Erythroneura bistrig
- Erythroneura browni
- Erythroneura caetra
- Erythroneura calycula
- Erythroneura cancellata
- Erythroneura carinata
- Erythroneura cassavae
- Erythroneura chaudhrii
- Erythroneura claripennis
- Erythroneura coloradensis
- Erythroneura comes
- Erythroneura corni
- Erythroneura cymbium
- Erythroneura delicata
- Erythroneura diva
- Erythroneura doris
- Erythroneura elegans
- Erythroneura elegantula
- Erythroneura evansi
- Erythroneura festiva
- Erythroneura fiduciaria
- Erythroneura flavogutta
- Erythroneura fraxa
- Erythroneura fulvidorsum
- Erythroneura gilensis
- Erythroneura glabra
- Erythroneura glavogutta
- Erythroneura harmsi
- Erythroneura infuscata
- Erythroneura integra
- Erythroneura ipoloa
- Erythroneura kanwakae
- Erythroneura kashmirensis
- Erythroneura kennedyi
- Erythroneura kerzhneri
- Erythroneura lalage
- Erythroneura leveri
- Erythroneura macarangae
- Erythroneura modesta
- Erythroneura nayavua
- Erythroneura nudata
- Erythroneura octonotata
- Erythroneura omaska
- Erythroneura ontari
- Erythroneura ortha
- Erythroneura palimpsesta
- Erythroneura plagiata
- Erythroneura pontifex
- Erythroneura postica
- Erythroneura prima
- Erythroneura prosata
- Erythroneura reflecta
- Erythroneura rewana
- Erythroneura rosa
- Erythroneura rubra
- Erythroneura rubrella
- Erythroneura shirozui
- Erythroneura subfumata
- Erythroneura tacita
- Erythroneura triapitsyni
- Erythroneura tricincta
- Erythroneura urakensis
- Erythroneura vaga
- Erythroneura vagabunda
- Erythroneura vitifex
- Erythroneura vitis
- Erythroneura ziczac
