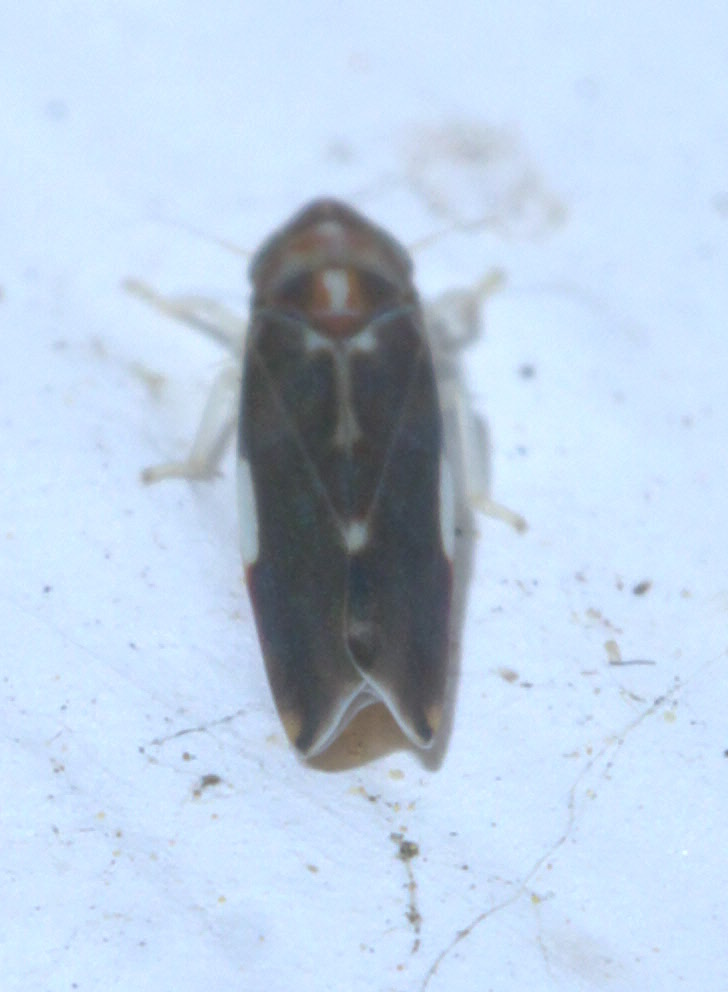

Scientific classification
- Domain: Eukaryota
- Kingdom: Animalia
- Phylum: Arthropoda
- Class: Insecta
- Order: Hemiptera
- Suborder: Auchenorrhyncha
- Family: Cicadellidae
- Genus: Erythroneura
- Species: E. infuscata

Binomial name
- Erythroneura infuscata (Gillette, 1898)

= Erythroneura infuscata =

Species of true bug

Erythroneura infuscata, commonly known as Leafhopper, is a species of leafhopper in the family Cicadellidae.

A dark, mostly black species that is distinctive in appearance from most other members of the family Typhlocybinae. The black wings and body have several small pale spots at the base of the wings, down the midlength, and on the scutellum. There is a prominent white patch on the costal margin of each wing, followed by a red mark. The legs and face are whitish. Adults are 2.8-3.0 mm long.

Found in mixed hardwood forest habitat, is attracted at night with a light.

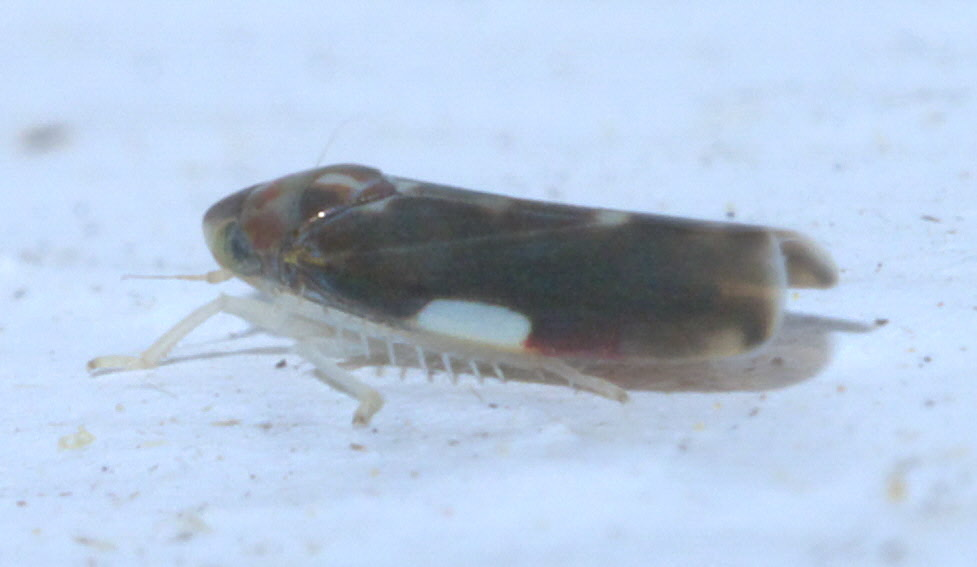
