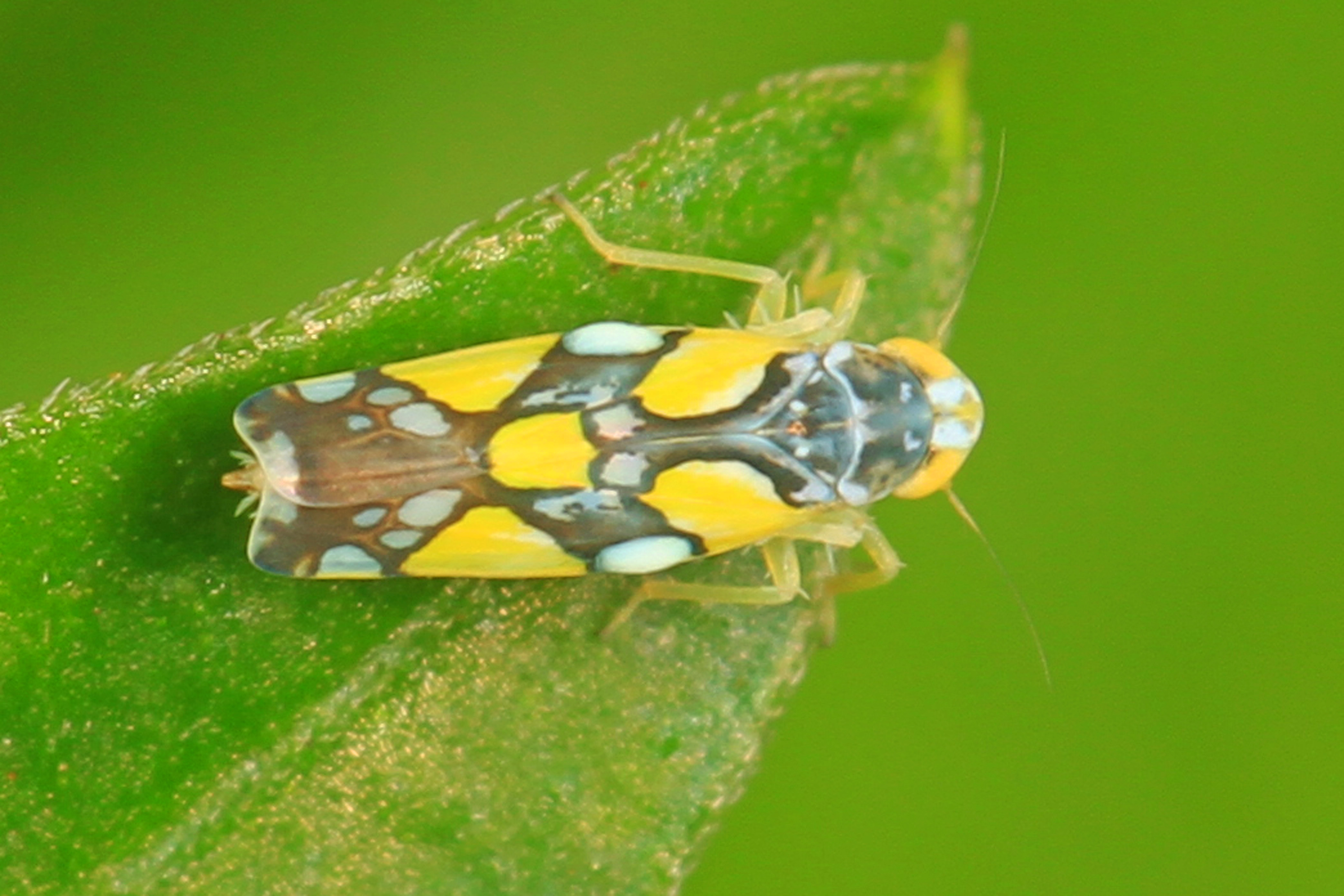

Scientific classification
- Domain: Eukaryota
- Kingdom: Animalia
- Phylum: Arthropoda
- Class: Insecta
- Order: Hemiptera
- Suborder: Auchenorrhyncha
- Family: Cicadellidae
- Genus: Protalebrella
- Species: P. brasiliensis

Binomial name
- Protalebrella brasiliensis (Baker, 1899)

= Protalebrella brasiliensis =

Species of true bug

Protalebrella brasiliensis, the Brazilian leafhopper, is a species of leafhopper in the family Cicadellidae.
