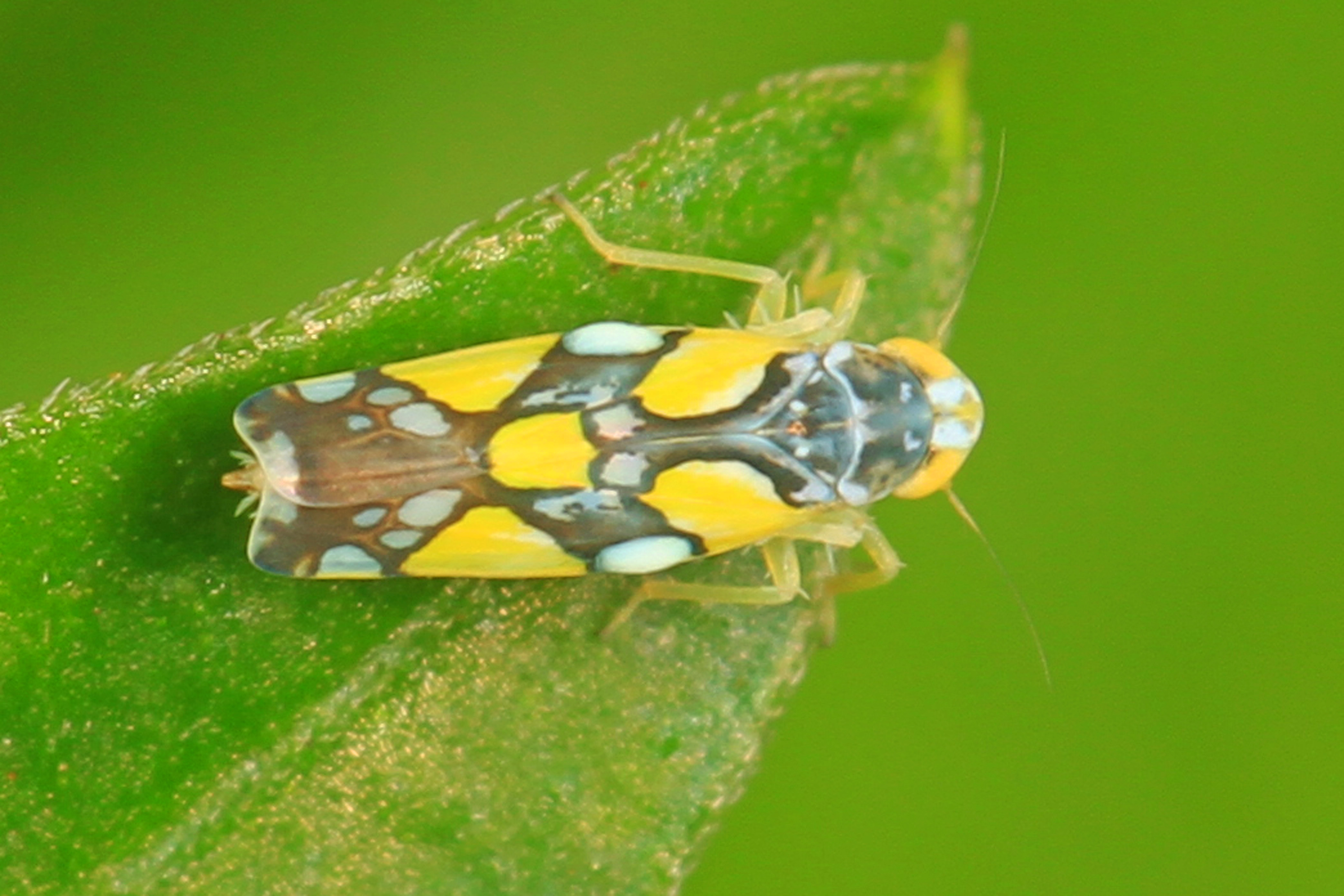
- Protalebrella brasiliensis

Scientific classification
- Domain: Eukaryota
- Kingdom: Animalia
- Phylum: Arthropoda
- Class: Insecta
- Order: Hemiptera
- Suborder: Auchenorrhyncha
- Family: Cicadellidae
- Genus: Protalebrella

= Protalebrella =

Genus of leafhoppers

Protalebrella is a genus of leafhoppers in the family Cicadellidae. There are about 11 described species in Protalebrella.

== Species ==
These 11 species belong to the genus Protalebrella:

- Protalebrella brasiliensis (Baker, 1899) (Brazilian leafhopper)
- Protalebrella conica (Ruppel & DeLong, 1953)
- Protalebrella iris Young, 1957
- Protalebrella panamensis Young, 1957
- Protalebrella parana Young, 1957
- Protalebrella prima Dworakowska, 1994
- Protalebrella quarta Dworakowska, 1994
- Protalebrella schachovskoyi Torres, 1955
- Protalebrella secunda Dworakowska, 1994
- Protalebrella terminata (Baker, 1899)
- Protalebrella tertia Dworakowska, 1994
