= Sylhetia =

Scientific classification
- Domain: Eukaryota
- Kingdom: Animalia
- Phylum: Arthropoda
- Class: Insecta
- Order: Hemiptera
- Suborder: Auchenorrhyncha
- Family: Cicadellidae
- Subfamily: Typhlocybinae
- Tribe: Typhlocybini
- Genus: Sylhetia; Ahmed, 1972

Genus of insects

Sylhetia is a genus of insects. Sylhetia belongs to the family Cicadellidae (leafhoppers). The cladogram according to the Catalogue of Life is:

- Sylhetia
  - Sylhetia punctata
  - Sylhetia spinata
