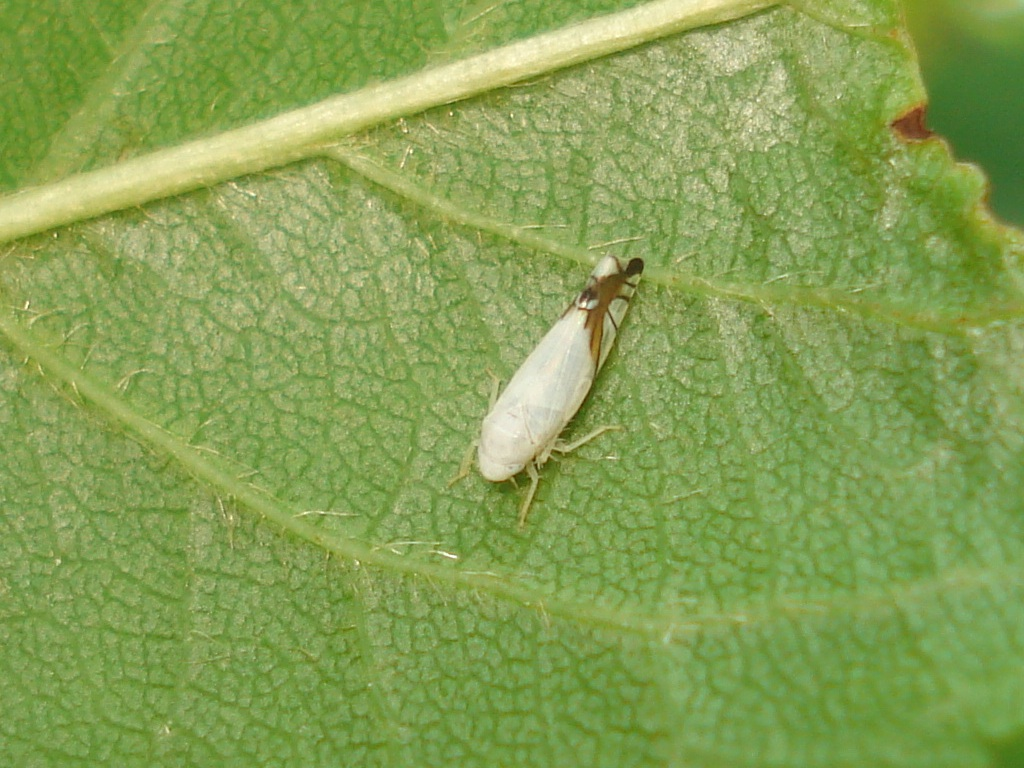
- Aguriahana stellulata

Scientific classification
- Domain: Eukaryota
- Kingdom: Animalia
- Phylum: Arthropoda
- Class: Insecta
- Order: Hemiptera
- Suborder: Auchenorrhyncha
- Family: Cicadellidae
- Subfamily: Typhlocybinae
- Tribe: Typhlocybini
- Genus: Aguriahana; Distant, 1918

= Aguriahana =

Genus of true bugs

Aguriahana is a genus of true bugs belonging to the family Cicadellidae.

The genus was first described by Distant in 1918.

The species of this genus are found in Europe, Northern America, Japan.

Species:

- Aguriahana stellulata (Burmeister, 1841)
