= Sylhetia punctata =

Scientific classification
- Domain: Eukaryota
- Kingdom: Animalia
- Phylum: Arthropoda
- Class: Insecta
- Order: Hemiptera
- Suborder: Auchenorrhyncha
- Family: Cicadellidae
- Genus: Sylhetia
- Species: S. punctata

Binomial name
- Sylhetia punctata Ahmed, 1972

Species of insect

Sylhetia punctata is a species of insect. It was first described by Manzoor Ahmed in 1972. Sylhetia punctata belongs to the genus Sylhetia and the family Cicadellidae.

This species is distributed in Bangladesh. No subspecies are listed for it.
