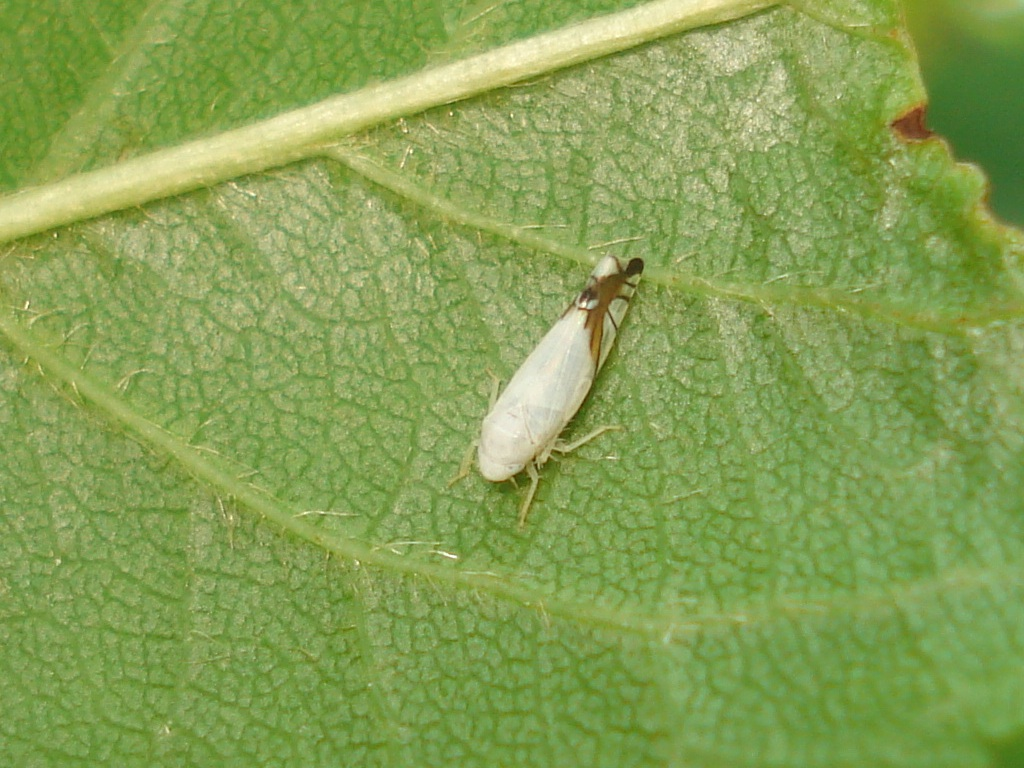

Scientific classification
- Kingdom: Animalia
- Phylum: Arthropoda
- Class: Insecta
- Order: Hemiptera
- Suborder: Auchenorrhyncha
- Family: Cicadellidae
- Genus: Aguriahana
- Species: A. stellulata

Binomial name
- Aguriahana stellulata (Burmeister, 1841)

= Aguriahana stellulata =

Species of true bug

Aguriahana stellulata is a species of true bug belonging to the family Cicadellidae.

It is native to Europe and Northern America.
