= Sylhetia spinata =

Scientific classification
- Kingdom: Animalia
- Phylum: Arthropoda
- Class: Insecta
- Order: Hemiptera
- Suborder: Auchenorrhyncha
- Family: Cicadellidae
- Genus: Sylhetia
- Species: S. spinata

Binomial name
- Sylhetia spinata Mathew & K. Ramakrishnan, 2002

Species of insect

Sylhetia spinata is a species of insect in the leafhopper family Cicadellidae. No subspecies are listed in the Catalogue of Life.
