= Kunzeana =

Scientific classification
- Domain: Eukaryota
- Kingdom: Animalia
- Phylum: Arthropoda
- Class: Insecta
- Order: Hemiptera
- Suborder: Auchenorrhyncha
- Family: Cicadellidae
- Subfamily: Typhlocybinae
- Tribe: Dikraneurini
- Subtribe: Dikraneurina
- Genus: Kunzeana; Oman, 1949

Genus of true bugs

Kunzeana is a genus of leafhoppers in the family Cicadellidae. There are more than 30 described species in Kunzeana.

== Species ==
These 37 species belong to the genus Kunzeana:

- Kunzeana acaciae Ruppel & DeLong, 1951
- Kunzeana aurulenta (Lawson, 1930)
- Kunzeana benedicti (Beamer, 1943)
- Kunzeana caldwelli Ruppel & DeLong, 1952
- Kunzeana carmenae Ruppel & DeLong, 1952
- Kunzeana curiosa (Beamer, 1945)
- Kunzeana deschoni (Baker, 1903)
- Kunzeana deserta Ruppel & DeLong, 1952
- Kunzeana ebena Ruppel & DeLong, 1952
- Kunzeana eburata Ruppel & DeLong, 1952
- Kunzeana flavella Ruppel & DeLong, 1952
- Kunzeana furcata (Beamer, 1943)
- Kunzeana galbana Ruppel & DeLong, 1952
- Kunzeana hebea Ruppel & DeLong, 1952
- Kunzeana kunzei (Gillette, 1898)
- Kunzeana lenta (McAtee, 1926)
- Kunzeana meta Ruppel & DeLong, 1952
- Kunzeana munda (Beamer, 1943)
- Kunzeana myersi (McAtee, 1926)
- Kunzeana parrai Ruppel & DeLong, 1952
- Kunzeana popae Ruppel & DeLong, 1951
- Kunzeana raia Ruppel & DeLong, 1952
- Kunzeana rosea (Osborn, 1928)
- Kunzeana salicis (Beamer, 1943)
- Kunzeana sandersi (Ball & DeLong, 1925)
- Kunzeana scimetara Ruppel & DeLong, 1952
- Kunzeana semiluna Ruppel & DeLong, 1951
- Kunzeana spinosa Ruppel & DeLong, 1952
- Kunzeana tamazella Ruppel & DeLong, 1952
- Kunzeana tenera (Beamer, 1943)
- Kunzeana tessellata Ruppel & DeLong, 1951
- Kunzeana texana (Beamer, 1943)
- Kunzeana usitata Ruppel & DeLong, 1952
- Kunzeana versicolora Ruppel & DeLong, 1951
- Kunzeana vomerella Ruppel & DeLong, 1952
- Kunzeana youngi Ruppel & DeLong, 1952
- Kunzeana zantedeschia Coelho, Da-Silva & Nessimian, 2014
