= Kunzeana kunzei =

Scientific classification
- Domain: Eukaryota
- Kingdom: Animalia
- Phylum: Arthropoda
- Class: Insecta
- Order: Hemiptera
- Suborder: Auchenorrhyncha
- Family: Cicadellidae
- Tribe: Dikraneurini
- Subtribe: Dikraneurina
- Genus: Kunzeana
- Species: K. kunzei

Binomial name
- Kunzeana kunzei (Gillette, 1898)

Species of true bug

Kunzeana kunzei is a species of leafhopper in the family Cicadellidae.
