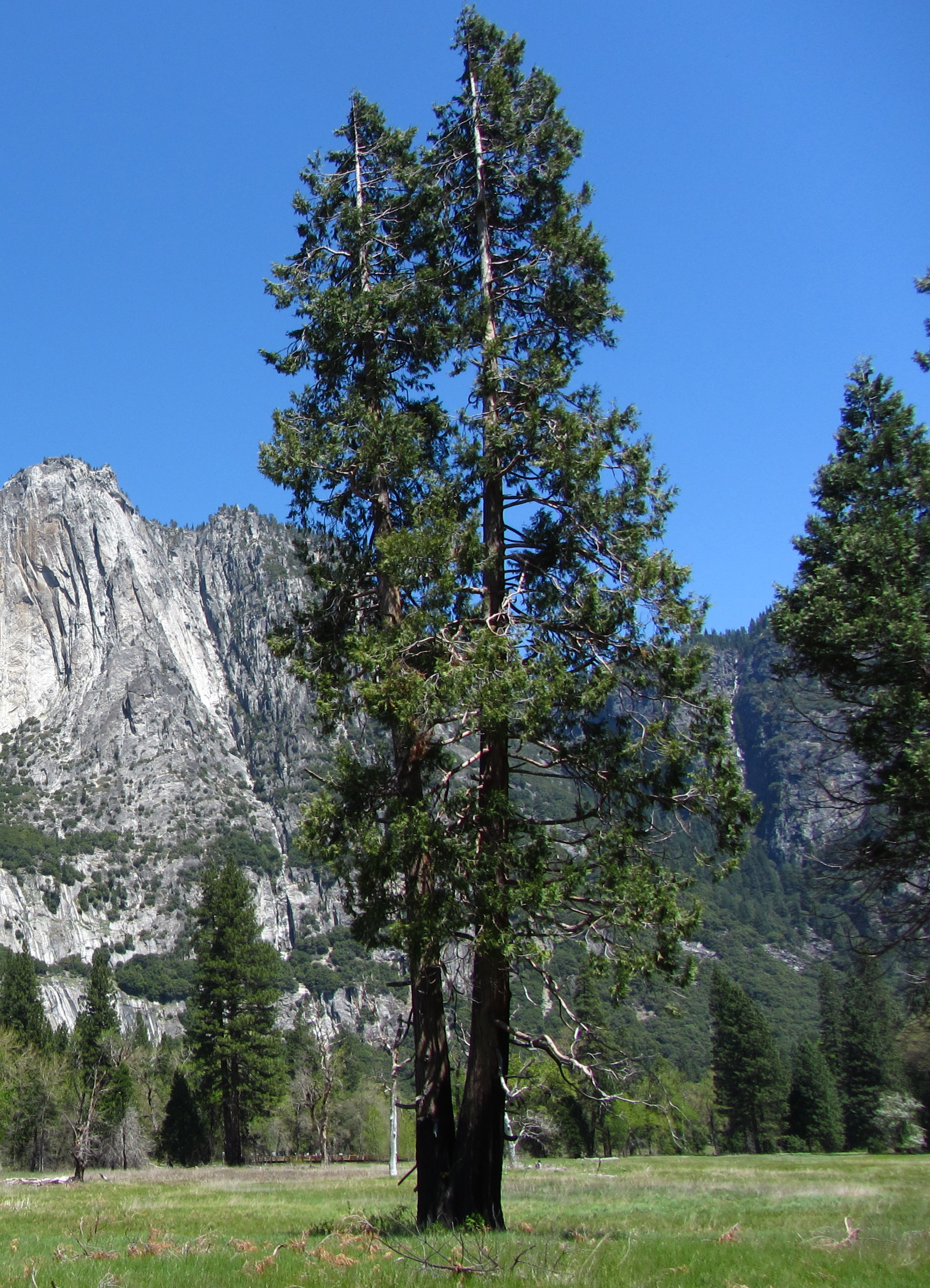
- Tree in Yosemite National Park, California

Conservation status
- Least Concern (IUCN 3.1)

Scientific classification
- Kingdom: Plantae
- Clade: Tracheophytes
- Clade: Gymnosperms
- Division: Pinophyta
- Class: Pinopsida
- Order: Cupressales
- Family: Cupressaceae
- Genus: Calocedrus
- Species: C. decurrens

Binomial name
- Calocedrus decurrens (Torr.) Florin
- Distribution of Calocedrus decurrens in the Western United States

Synonyms
- Abies cupressoides Poir.; Heyderia decurrens (Torr.) K.Koch; Libocedrus decurrens Torr.; Thuja craigana A.Murray bis; Thuja decurrens (Torr.) Voss

= Calocedrus decurrens =

Species of conifer

Calocedrus decurrens, with the common names incense cedar and California incense cedar (syn. Libocedrus decurrens Torr.), is a species of coniferous tree in the cypress family, Cupressaceae, native to western North America. It is the most widely known species in the genus, and is often simply called incense cedar without the regional qualifier.

== Description ==
Calocedrus decurrens is a large tree, typically reaching heights of 30–40 meters (100–130 ft) and a trunk diameter up to 1.2 m (3 ft 11 in). The largest known tree, located in Klamath National Forest, Siskiyou County, California, is 47.98 m (157 ft 5 in) tall with a 12 m (39 ft 4 in) circumference trunk and a 17.5 m (57 1/2 ft) spread. Specimens form a broad conic crown of spreading branches. The bark is orange-brown weathering grayish, smooth at first, becoming fissured and exfoliating in long strips on the lower trunk on old trees. Specimens can live to over 500 years old.

The foliage is produced in flattened sprays with scale-like leaves 2–15 mm (3/32–19/32 in) long; they are arranged in opposite decussate pairs, with the successive pairs closely then distantly spaced, so forming apparent whorls of four; the facial pairs are flat, with the lateral pairs folded over their bases. The leaves are bright green on both sides of the shoots, with only inconspicuous stomata. The foliage, when crushed, gives off an aroma somewhat akin to shoe-polish.

The seed cones are 20–35 mm (3/4–1 3/8 in) long, pale green to yellow, with four (rarely six) scales arranged in opposite decussate pairs; the outer pair of scales each bears two winged seeds, the inner pair(s) usually being sterile and fused together in a flat plate. The cones turn orange to yellow-brown when mature about 8 months after pollination. The pollen cones are 6–8 mm (1/4–5/16 in) long.

== Distribution ==
The bulk of the tree's range is in the United States, from central-southwestern Oregon through most of California and the extreme west of Nevada, as well as a short distance into northwest Mexico in northern Baja California.

It grows at elevations of 50–2,900 m (160–9,510 ft).

== Ecology ==
At lower elevations, associated trees include oaks and ponderosa pine. Giant sequoia bears similarities to the species, but has sharp leaves. In the south–southwest U.S. some have confused bushy junipers for incense cedar.

With its thick basal bark, the incense cedar is one of the most fire- and drought-tolerant plants in California. Although the tree is killed by hot, stand-replacing crown fire, it spreads rapidly after lower-intensity burns. This has given the incense cedar a competitive advantage over other species such as the bigcone Douglas-fir in recent years. Incense cedar is more shade tolerant than Douglas-fir, but not as much so as grand or white fir. It grows slowly when needed to outlast competition.

This tree is the preferred host of a wood wasp, Syntexis libocedrii a species which lays its eggs in the smoldering wood immediately after a forest fire. The tree is also host to incense-cedar mistletoe (Phoradendron libocedri), a parasitic plant which can often be found hanging from its branches. Fire scars provide an entry point for Tyromyces amarus (pocket dry rot). Gymnosporangium rust disease afflicts the trees, but is rarely fatal.

For numerous birds during the wintertime, Calocedrus decurrens has been seen to be used for foraging. According to the United States Department of Agriculture, in areas of the Western Sierra Nevada in California, numerous species of birds are thought to use the incense cedar as a "foraging substrate" so that they can attain as much food as needed. Human impacts on these trees due to forest management practices have caused issues for many of these birds, threatening the use of the incense cedar as a forage substrate.

== Uses ==
The wood is soft and light, and has a pleasant odor and is generally resistant to rot. It has been used for external house siding, interior paneling, and to make moth-resistant hope chests. It was once the primary material for wooden pencils, because it is soft and tends to sharpen easily without forming splinters.

=== Native Americans ===
Indigenous peoples of California use the plant in traditional medicine, basket making, hunting bows, building materials, and to produce fire by friction. A Northern California tribe used branchlets to filter out sand from water when leaching toxins from acorn meal; foliage also served as a flavoring.

The Maidu Concow tribe name for the plant is hö'-tä (Konkow language).

=== Cultivation ===
Calocedrus decurrens is cultivated as an ornamental tree, for planting in gardens and parks. It is used in traditional, xeriscapic, native plant, and wildlife gardens; and also in designed natural landscaping and habitat restoration projects in California. It is valued for its columnar form and evergreen foliage textures.

The tree is also grown in gardens and parks in cool summer climates, including the Pacific Northwest in the Northwestern United States and British Columbia, eastern Great Britain and continental Northern Europe. In these areas it can develop an especially narrow columnar crown, an unexplained consequence of the cooler climatic conditions that is rare in trees within its warm summer natural range in the California Floristic Province. Other cultivated species from the family Cupressaceae can have similar crown forms.

==== Award of Garden Merit ====
This plant has gained the Royal Horticultural Society's Award of Garden Merit, and has the cultivar 'Berrima Gold'.

=== Essential oils ===
Various species in the family Cupressaceae can be utilized for the creation of essential oils. Scientific studies have shown that these essential oils have "strong antimicrobial properties." Antimicrobial properties are those properties of a substance that lower the levels of microbes, such as bacteria and viruses. These antimicrobial properties could potentially be used for therapies in developing countries, although more testing and clinical trials should be done before such measures are implemented.

== See also ==
- Cedar wood
- List of California native plants
- Plants used in traditional Native American medicine

== Gallery ==
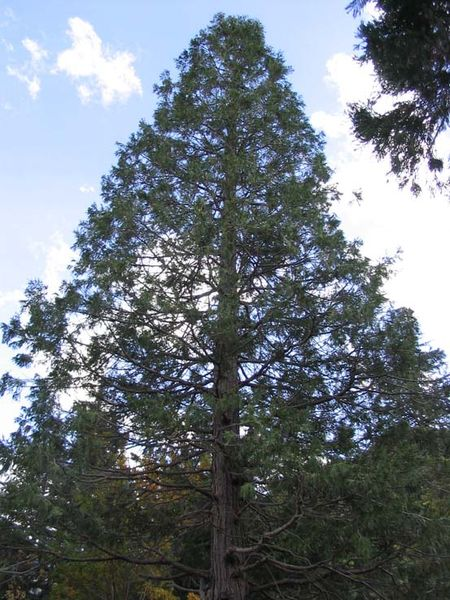
Adult specimen

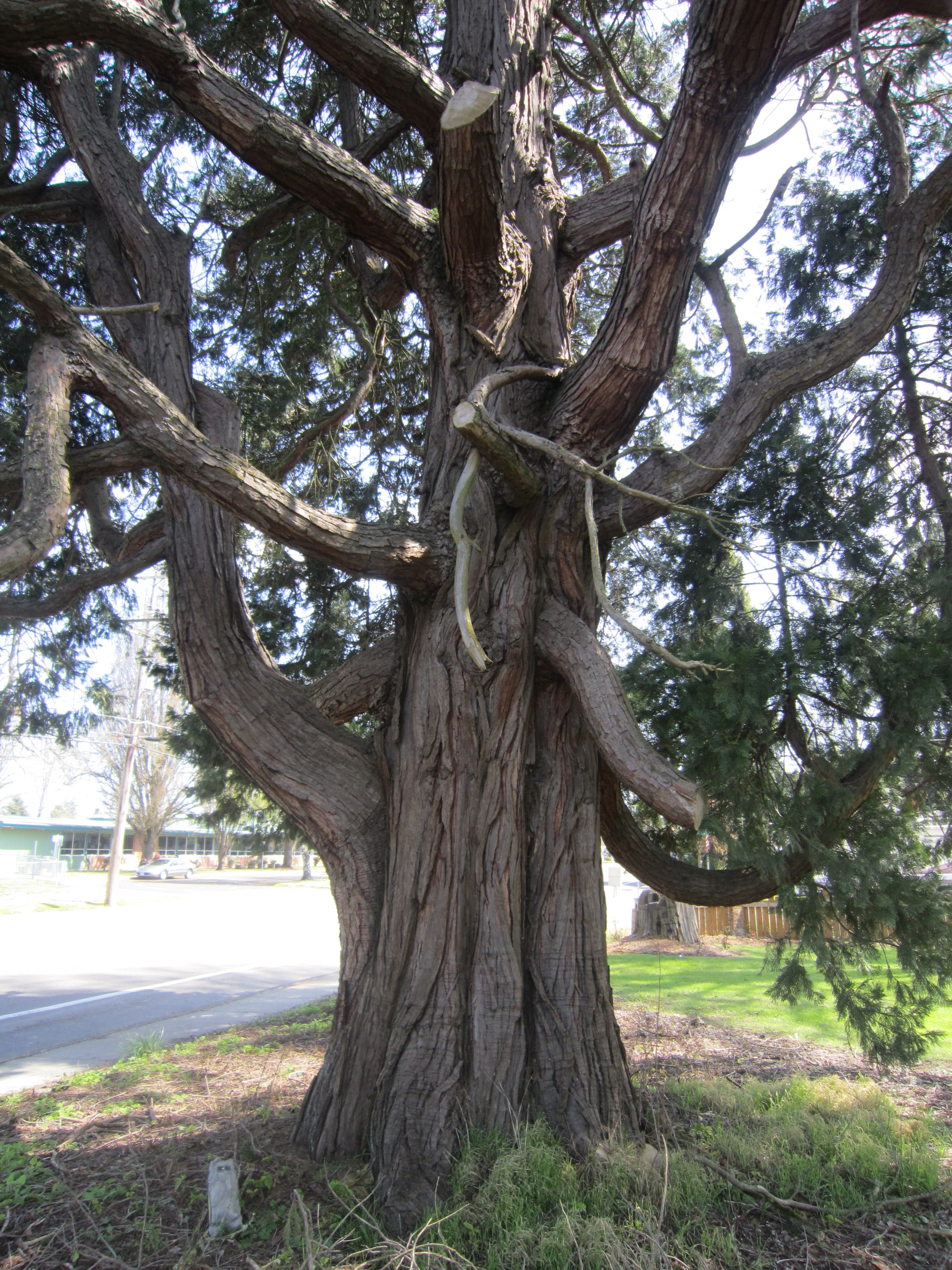
Tree in McMinnville, Oregon

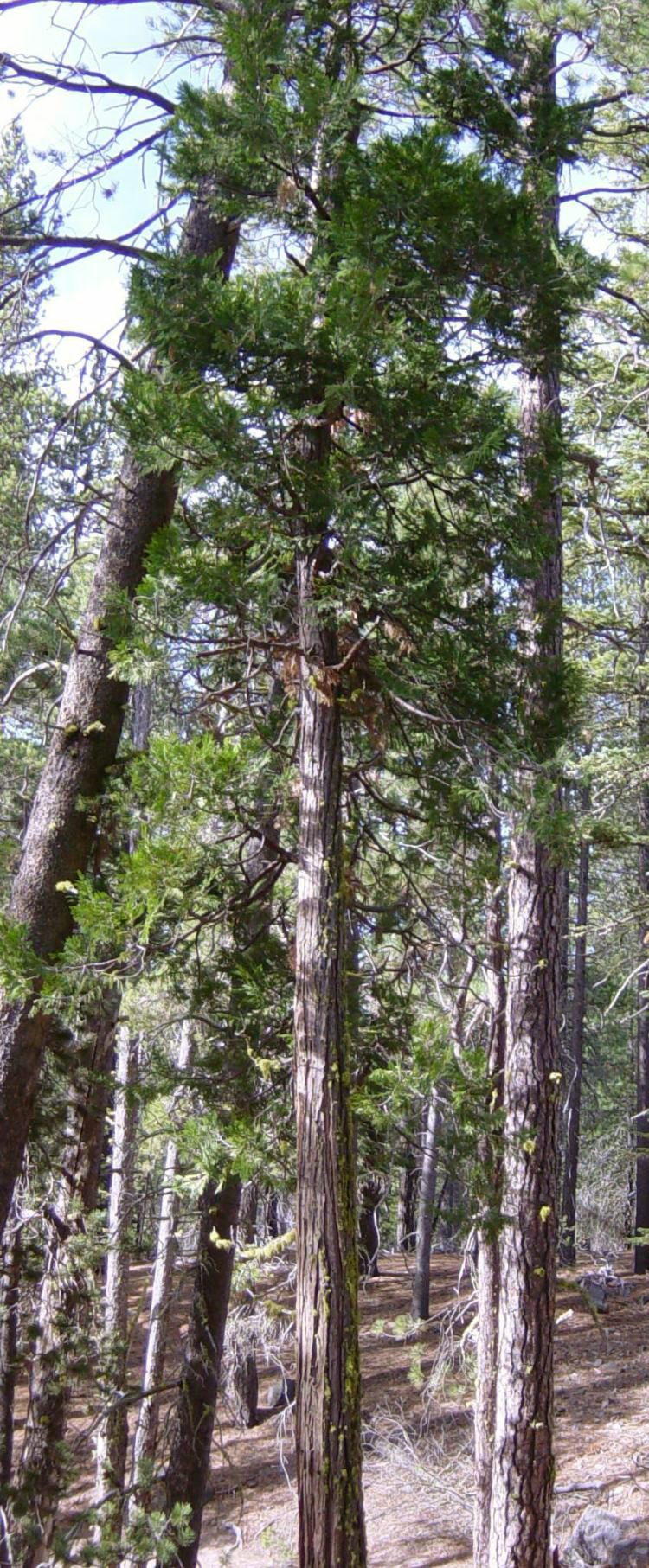
Trunks in Lassen Volcanic National Park, California

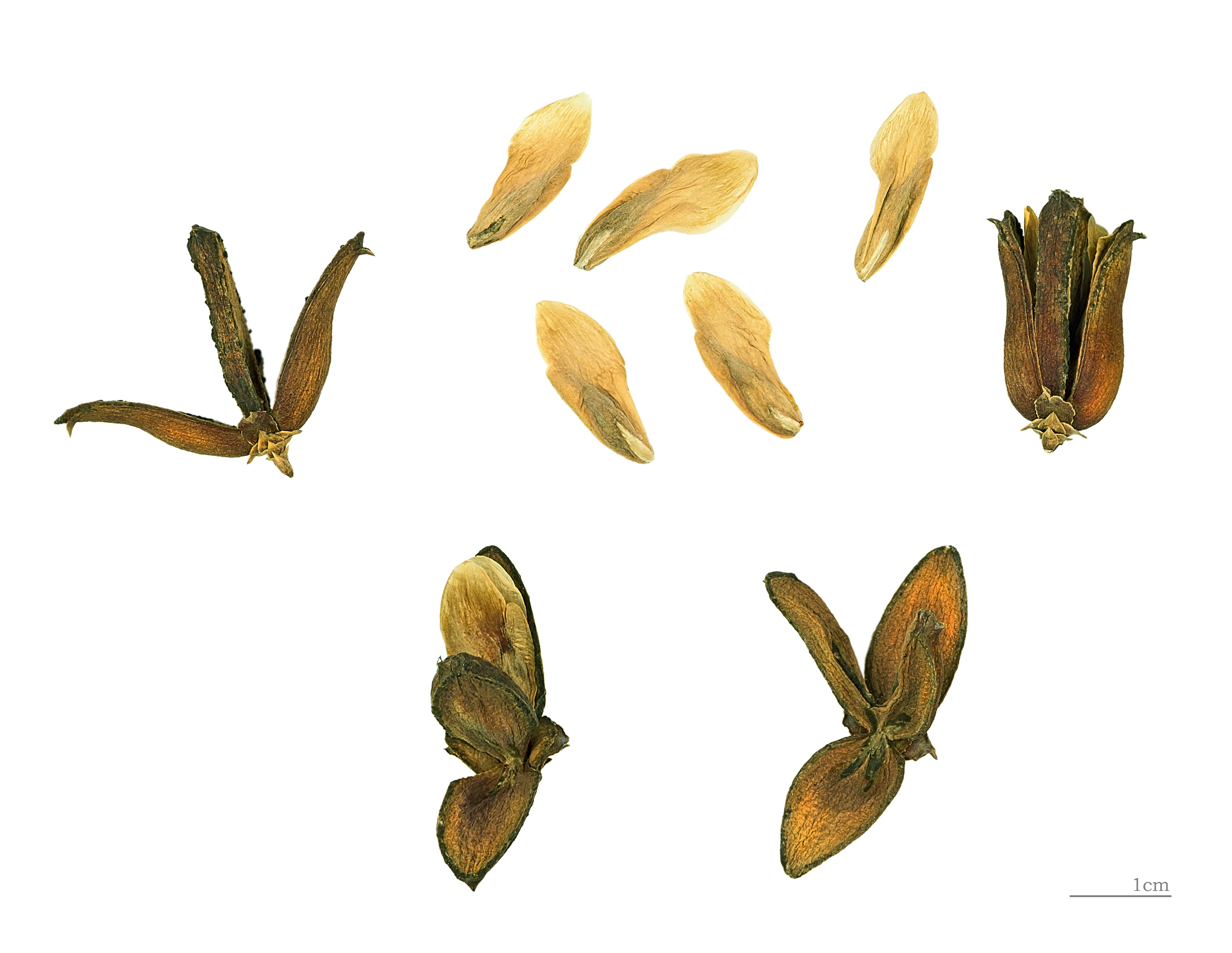
Cones and seeds

Foliage of a tree in Shasta–Trinity National Forest

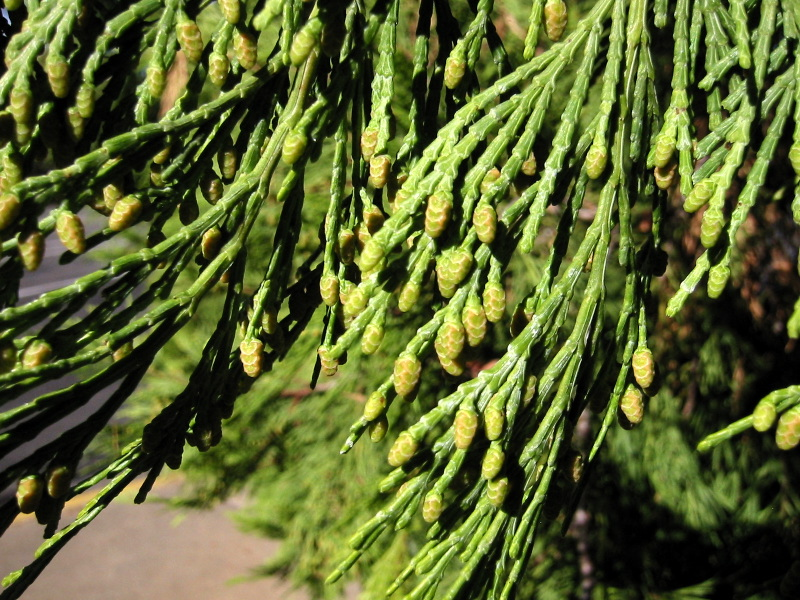
Foliage and pollen cones

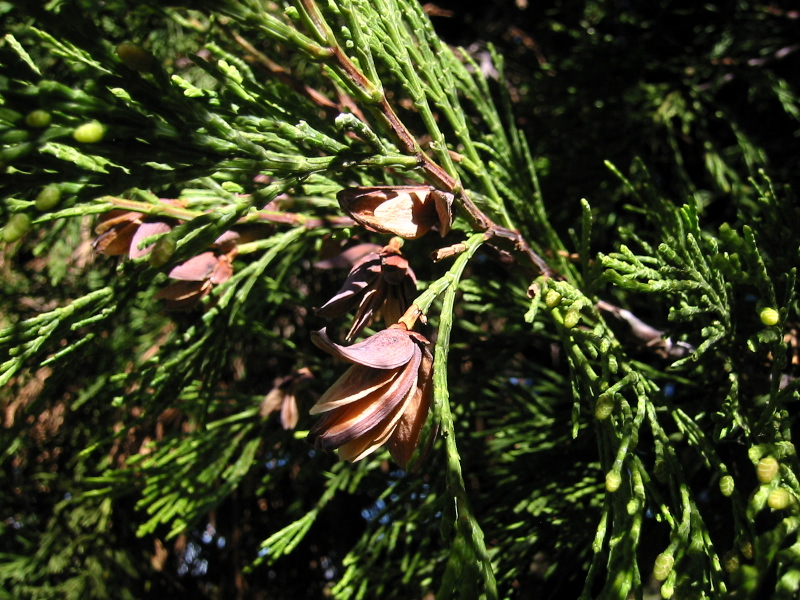
Opened cones

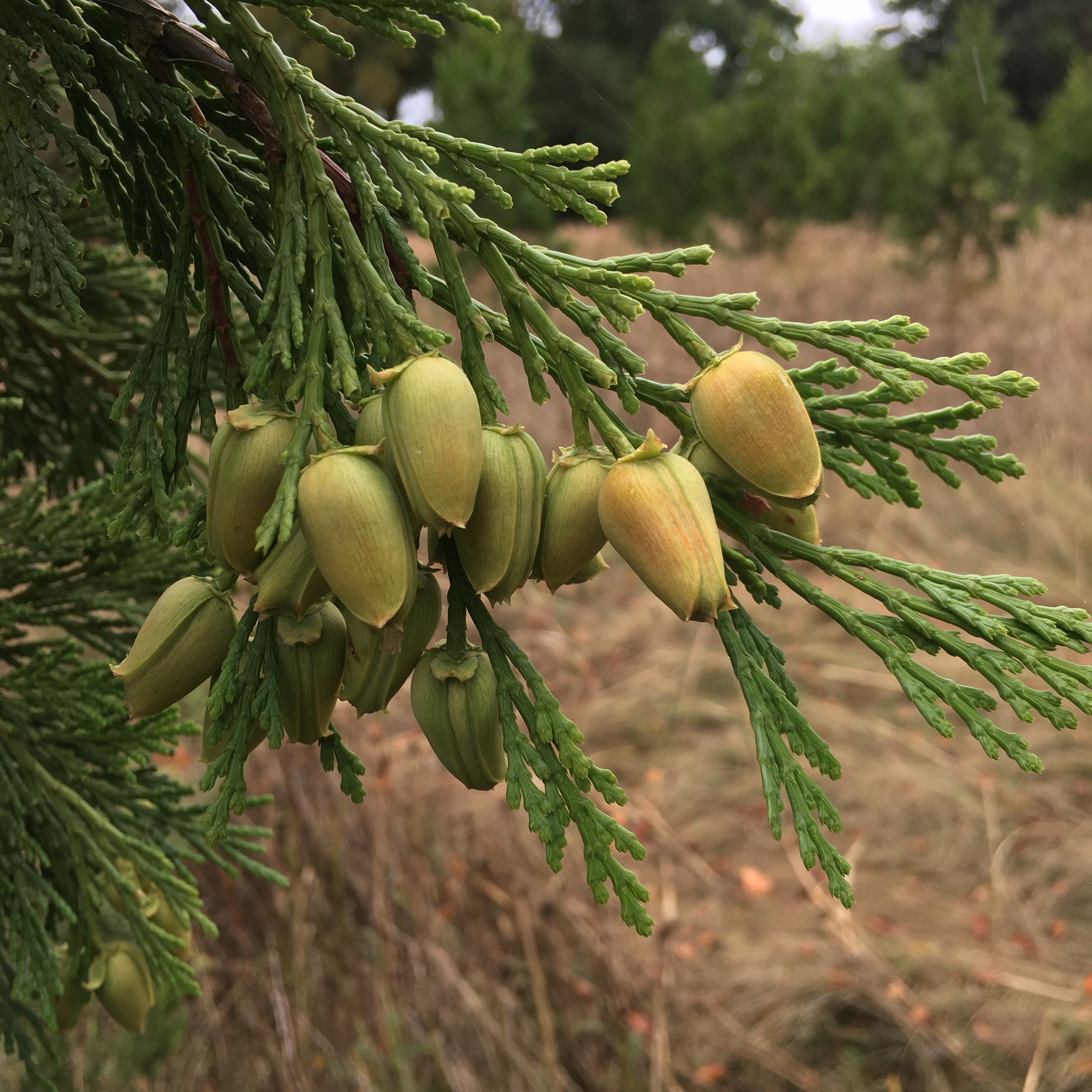
Young female cones

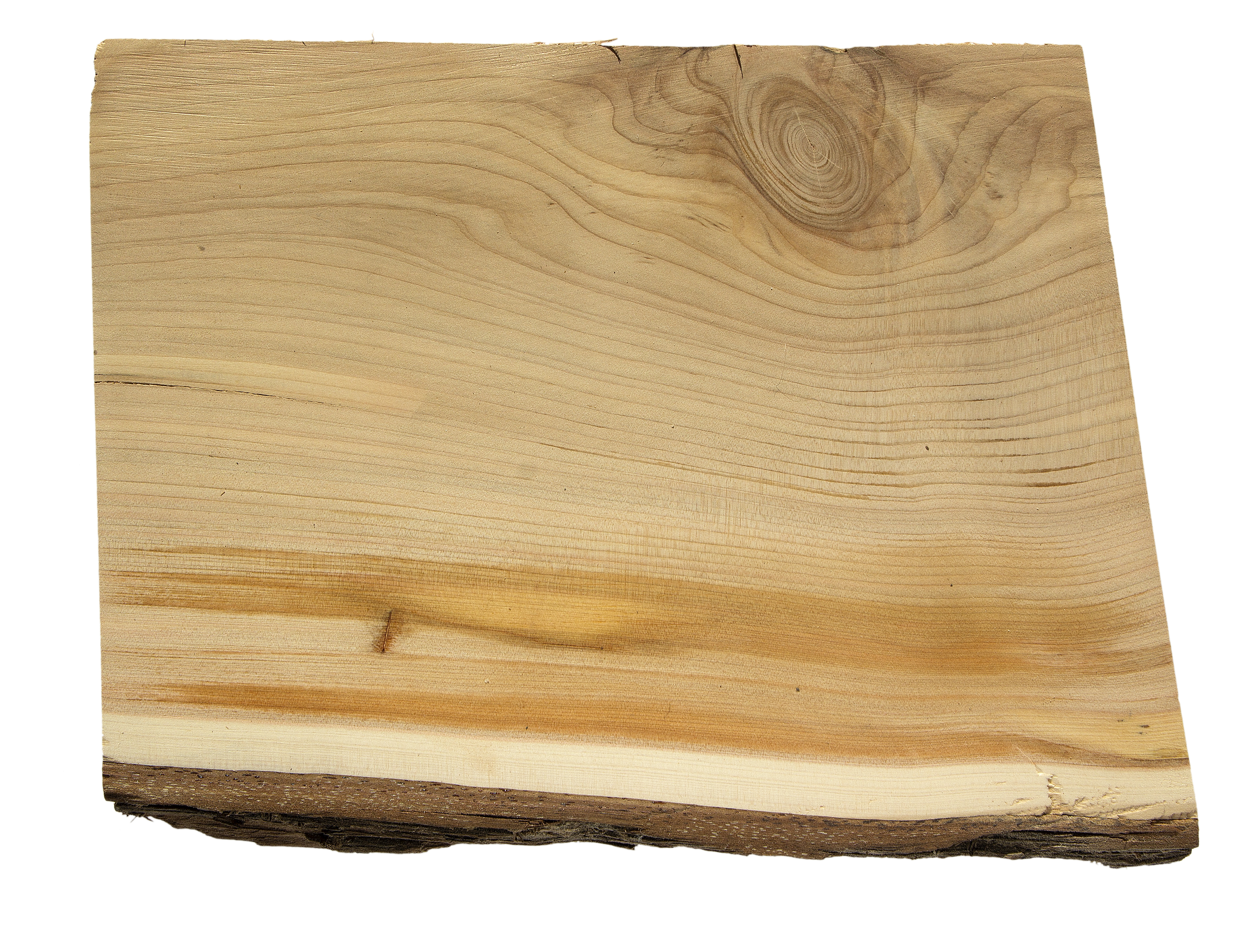
Section of wood
