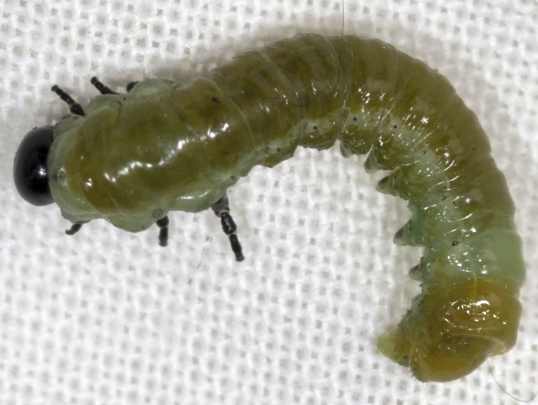
- Larvae

Scientific classification
- Kingdom: Animalia
- Phylum: Arthropoda
- Clade: Pancrustacea
- Class: Insecta
- Order: Hymenoptera
- Suborder: Symphyta
- Superfamily: Tenthredinoidea
- Family: Zenargidae; Malagón-Aldana, Smith, Shinohara & Vilhelmsen, 2021
- Genus: Zenarge; Rohwer, 1918
- Species: Z. turneri

Binomial name
- Zenarge turneri Rohwer, 1918

= Zenarge =

Genus of sawfly

Zenarge turneri, also known as the cypress pine sawfly or callitris sawfly, is the only recognized species in its family Zenargidae and the genus Zenarge. It is found in Australia and is known as a pest in New South Wales due to its predation of Callitris and Cupressus folliage.

== Taxonomy ==
There are currently 2 recognized subspecies:

- Zenarge turneri turneri Rohwer, 1918 – Generally larger, partially white hind tibiae
- Zenarge turneri ragus Moore, 1962 – Generally smaller, black hind tibiae
