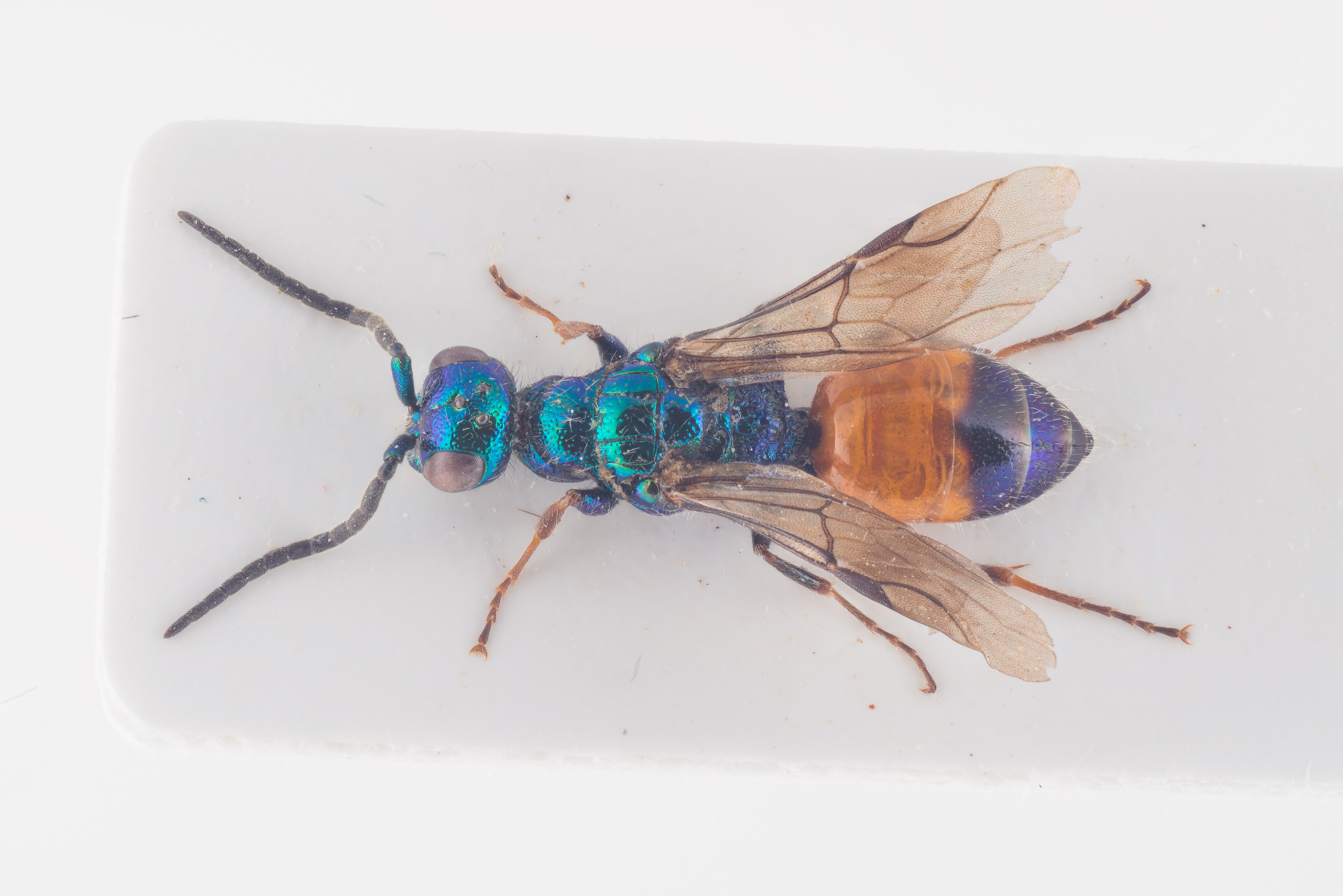
- Cleptes semicyaneus

Scientific classification
- Kingdom: Animalia
- Phylum: Arthropoda
- Class: Insecta
- Order: Hymenoptera
- Family: Chrysididae
- Subfamily: Cleptinae

= Cleptinae =

Subfamily of wasps

Cleptinae is a small subfamily of cuckoo wasps in the family Chrysididae. There are 3 genera and almost 100 described species in Cleptinae, and they are parasitoids of prepupal larvae of tenthredinoid sawflies.

== Genera ==
- Cleptes Latreille, 1802
- Cleptidea Mocsáry, 1904
- Lustrina Kurian, 1955
