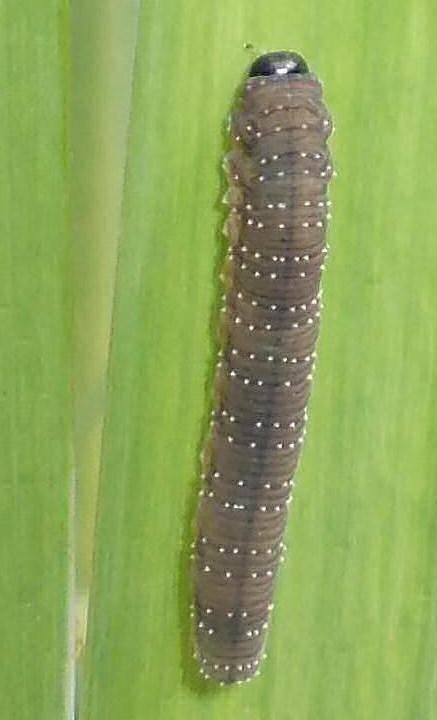
- Caterpillar larva of yellow flag iris sawfly (Rhadinoceraea micans) on host plant

Scientific classification
- Kingdom: Animalia
- Phylum: Arthropoda
- Class: Insecta
- Order: Hymenoptera
- Suborder: Symphyta
- Family: Tenthredinidae
- Subfamily: Blennocampinae
- Genus: Rhadinoceraea
- Species: R. micans

Binomial name
- Rhadinoceraea micans Klug, 1816

Synonyms
- Tenthredo micans (Klug 1816); Monophadnus iridis (Kaltenbach 1862)

= Rhadinoceraea micans =

Species of insect

Rhadinoceraea micans, the iris sawfly, is a species of sawfly in the family Tenthredinidae. Native to Europe, the larvae—more often noticed than the adults—can occur in large numbers causing damage to garden plants such as the yellow iris or flag, Iris pseudacorus.

== Description ==
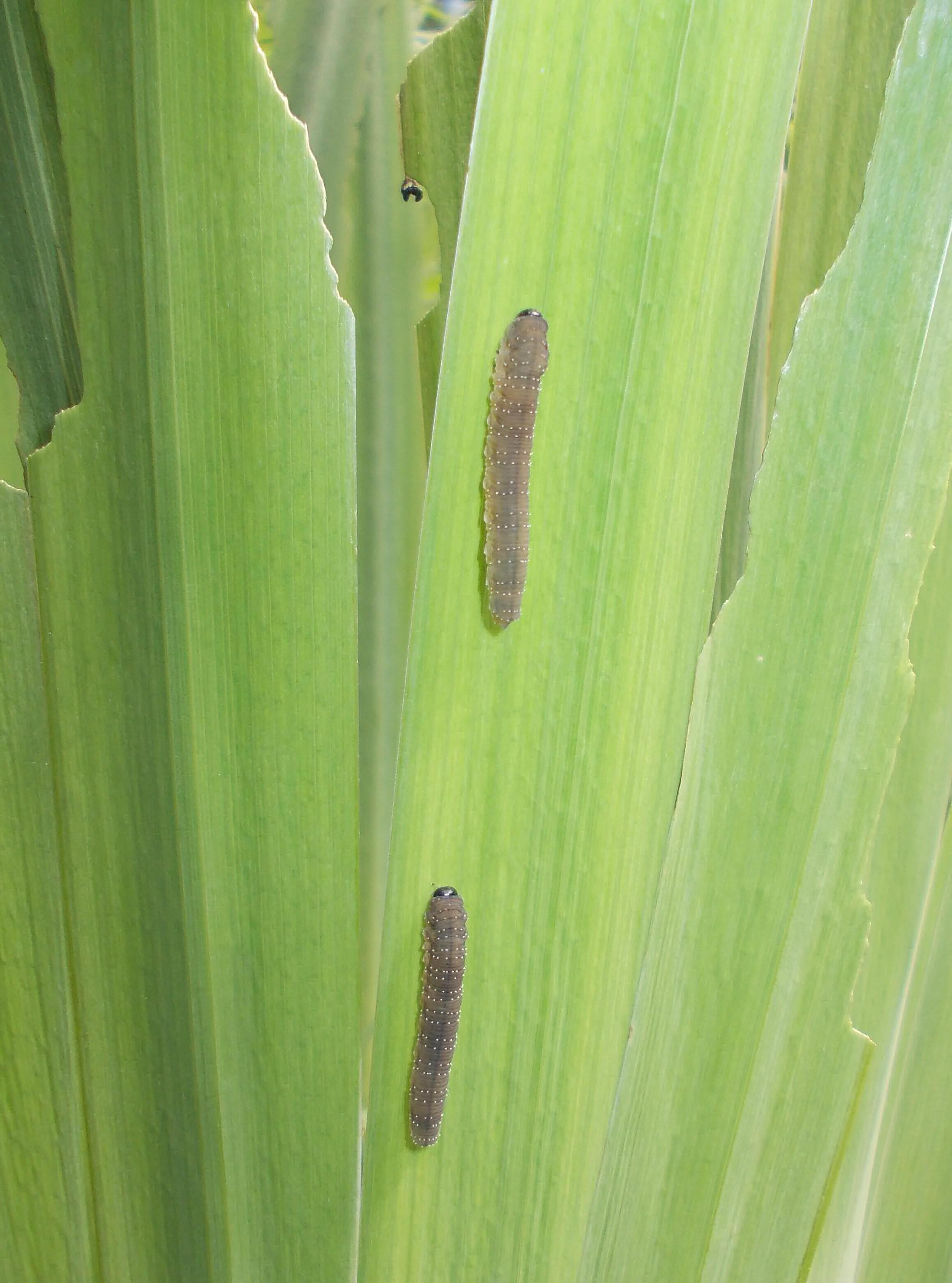
Caterpillar-like larvae of R. micans on yellow iris, showing damage to host plant

=== Adult ===
The adult sawfly is shiny, black, and hairy. The antennae are thick, and longer than head and thorax combined. The wings are slightly smoky. The head is as wide as the thorax.

=== Larva ===
The larvae, up to 1 inch (25 mm) long, look like caterpillars but have six pairs of prolegs rather than five. The head is shiny black; the body greenish brown, becoming darker with age. There are double rows of white dots around the segments. Larval host plants are all waterside irises, including Iris pseudacorus, Iris ensata, Iris laevigata, Iris spuria and Iris versicolor.

== Life cycle and behaviour ==
The adult iris sawflies lay their eggs in May on the leaves of irises (especially the yellow flag). The eggs are in large flat placards on iris leaves. The female lays the eggs by inserting her "saw" into the blade of the leaf near the thickened middle, not far from the leaf base. As many as 19 eggs may be inserted into separate cells of a single leaf. The larvae eat the leaves until about July and then crawl into the ground. There, they spin cocoons and pupate. They overwinter as pupae. The adults hatch in May of the following year.

The adults fly reluctantly and may sham death if touched.

The larvae are serious garden pests and can completely defoliate irises, especially the yellow iris, when these are growing by water. Irises on dry ground are however not attacked.

== Distribution ==
The iris sawfly is endemic to Europe, being found in Britain, France, Sweden, Finland, Denmark, Netherlands, Germany, Poland, Italy, Bulgaria and Romania. It is absent from Spain, Sicily and the Mediterranean islands, Greece, former Yugoslavia and countries east of Poland.

== Bibliography ==
- Alford, David V. Plant Pests. Collins New Naturalist Library, 2011.
- Cameron, Peter. A monograph of the British phytophagous Hymenoptera (Volume 1). Ray Society. 1882. Archive.org Entry "Blennocampa micans", page 237.
- Halstead, Andrew, and Beatrice Henricot. Pests and Diseases: simple steps to success. Royal Horticultural Society/Dorling Kindersley, 2010. ISBN 978-1405-348867.
