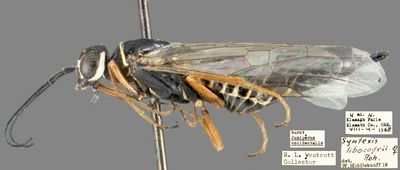
- Adult female from Oregon

Scientific classification
- Kingdom: Animalia
- Phylum: Arthropoda
- Class: Insecta
- Order: Hymenoptera
- Superfamily: Siricoidea
- Family: Anaxyelidae
- Subfamily: Syntexinae
- Genus: Syntexis
- Species: S. libocedrii

Binomial name
- Syntexis libocedrii Rohwer, 1915

= Syntexis libocedrii =

Species of sawfly

Syntexis libocedrii, (also called the cedar wood wasp or incense-cedar wood wasp) is the only living species in the wood wasp family Anaxyelidae, within the Symphyta, though the family has an extensive Mesozoic fossil record. This species is thus a "living fossil". It has the remarkable behavior of greatly favoring ovipositing in recently burnt incense-cedar (Calocedrus), red cedar (Thuja) or juniper (Juniperus). The wood is often still smoldering while the wasp is laying its eggs, and the larvae develop in the wood. S. libocedrii occurs from the mountains of central California to southern British Columbia, but is very rarely seen, except by firefighters.

== Bibliography ==
- Seltmann, Katja Chantre (December 2004). Building web-based interactive keys to the hymenopteran families and superfamilies (PDF). College of Agriculture, University of Kentucky. Archived from the original (M Sc Thesis) on 3 December 2011.
