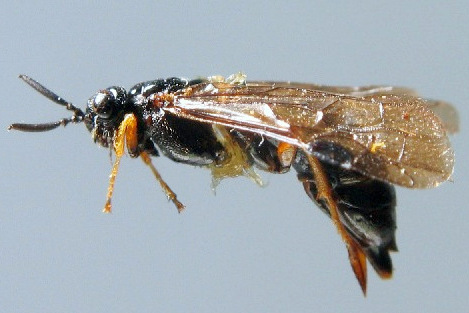
- Blasticotoma filiceti

Scientific classification
- Domain: Eukaryota
- Kingdom: Animalia
- Phylum: Arthropoda
- Class: Insecta
- Order: Hymenoptera
- Suborder: Symphyta
- Superfamily: Tenthredinoidea
- Family: Blasticotomidae; Thomson, 1871

Genera
- Blasticotoma Klug, 1834; Runaria Malaise, 1931; †Paremphytus Brues, 1908

= Blasticotomidae =

Family of sawflies

The Blasticotomidae are a very small family of sawflies, containing only 13 species in 3 genera worldwide, restricted to temperate regions of Eurasia where the larvae are specialized stem borers of ferns.

The family has antennae somewhat similar to the family Argidae, with only one or two flagellomeres, but can be distinguished by the lateral portions of the metasomal tergites being sharply creased beneath the spiracles.
