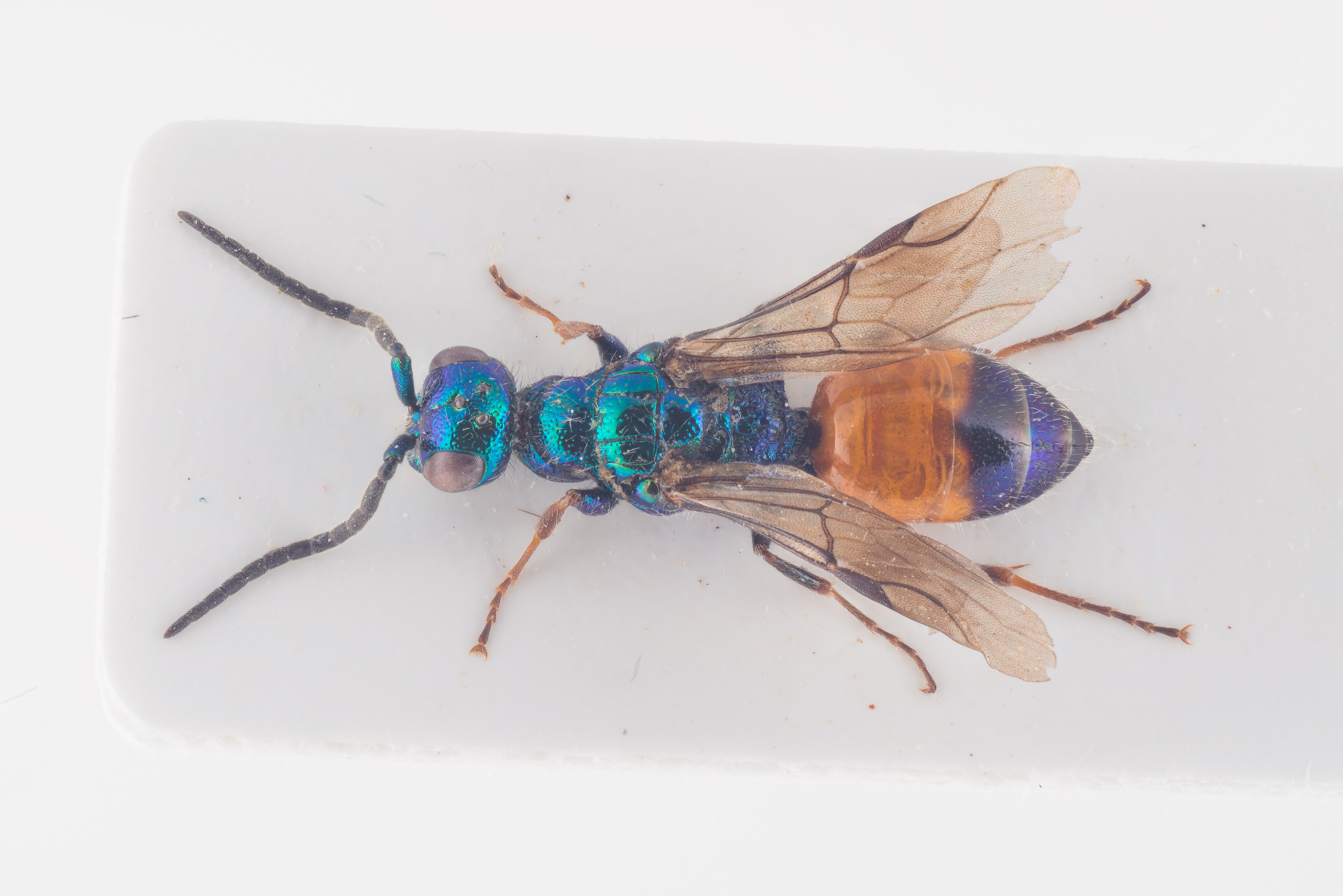

Scientific classification
- Kingdom: Animalia
- Phylum: Arthropoda
- Class: Insecta
- Order: Hymenoptera
- Family: Chrysididae
- Genus: Cleptes
- Species: C. semicyaneus

Binomial name
- Cleptes semicyaneus Tournier, 1879

Synonyms
- Cleptes elegans Mocsáry, 1901

= Cleptes semicyaneus =

Species of wasp

Cleptes semicyaneus is a species of cuckoo wasps in the subfamily Cleptinae. It is found in Europe.
