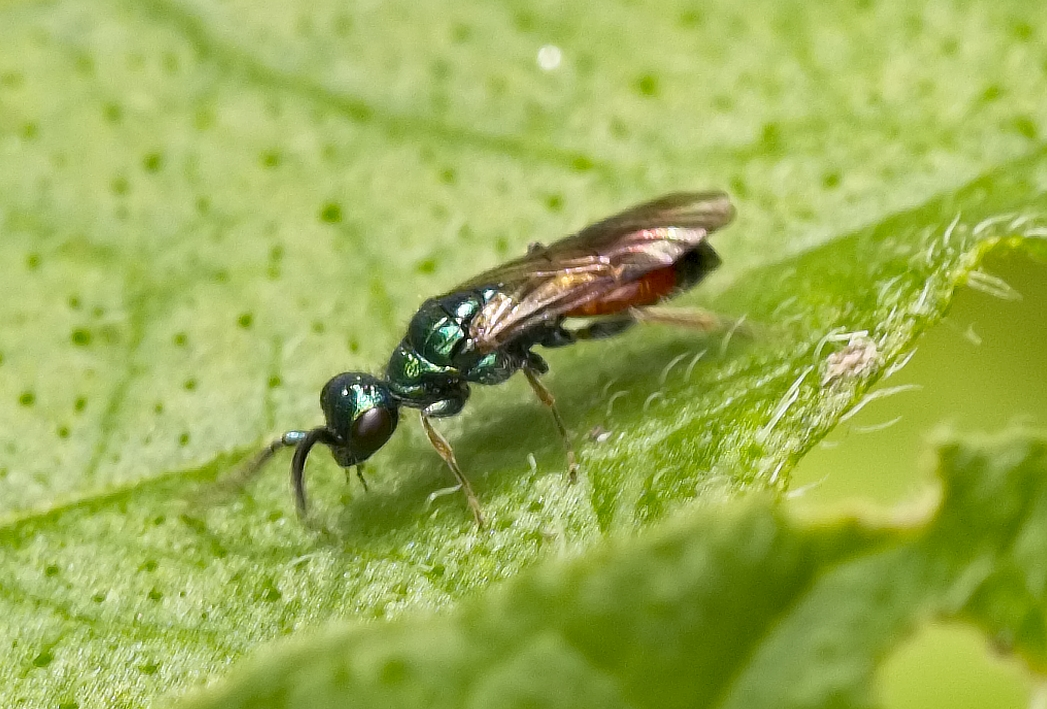
- Cleptes semiauratus

Scientific classification
- Kingdom: Animalia
- Phylum: Arthropoda
- Class: Insecta
- Order: Hymenoptera
- Family: Chrysididae
- Subfamily: Cleptinae
- Genus: Cleptes; Latreille, 1802

Species
- Several, including: Cleptes semicyaneus; Cleptes striatipleuris

Synonyms
- Chrysocleptes (Moczar, 1962); Holcocleptes (Moczar, 1962); Leiocleptes (Moczar, 1962); Melanocleptes (Moczar, 1962); Neocleptes (Kimsey, 1981); Oxycleptes (Moczar, 1962); Zimmermannia (Moczar, 1962)

= Cleptes =

Genus of wasps

Cleptes is a genus of cuckoo wasps in the subfamily Cleptinae. The genus contains 100 recognized species, making it the largest genus in the subfamily.

== Morphology ==
Members of the genus can be distinguished from related genera due to their smaller eyes, head as wide as long, and tarsal claws with only one perpendicular submedial tooth.
