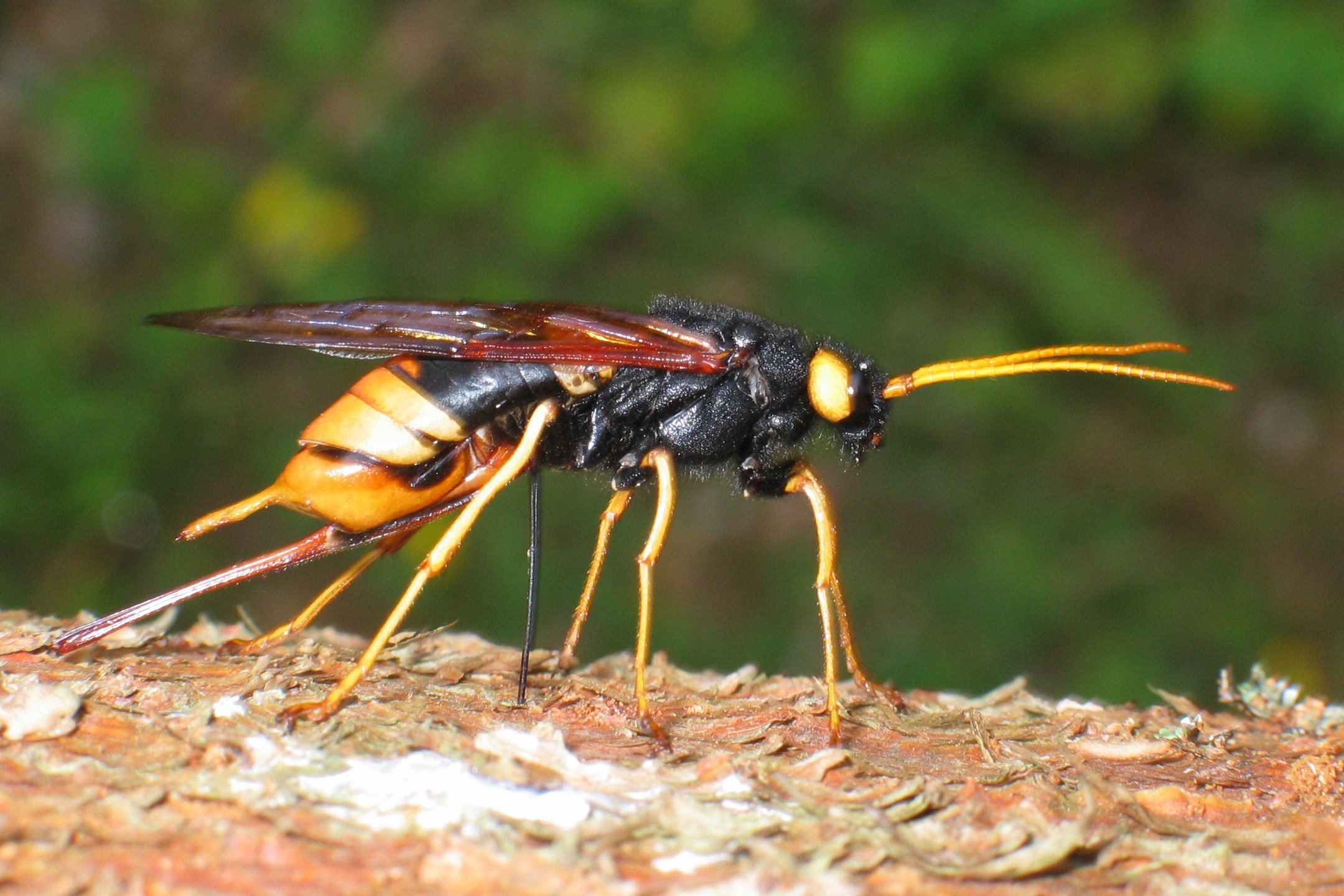
- Giant horntail (Urocerus gigas)

Scientific classification
- Domain: Eukaryota
- Kingdom: Animalia
- Phylum: Arthropoda
- Class: Insecta
- Order: Hymenoptera
- Clade: Unicalcarida
- Superfamily: Siricoidea

= Siricoidea =

Siricoidea Temporal range: Cretaceous-Present

Superfamily of sawflies

The superfamily Siricoidea is an archaic group of the order Hymenoptera, consisting of six families (four extinct) of xylophagous sawflies. The group is well represented in early Tertiary and Mesozoic times, but a number of living taxa remain, including the family Anaxyelidae, which has recently been linked to this group (it was previously placed in its own superfamily, Anaxyeloidea). The female ovipositor is typically long and projects posteriorly, and is used to drill into wood.

== Families ==
- Anaxyelidae (cedar wood wasps)
- Siricidae (horntails)
- Xiphydriidae (wood wasps, sometimes treated as a separate superfamily, Xiphydrioidea)
- † Daohugoidae
- † Protosiricidae
- † Pseudosiricidae
- † Sinosiricidae
