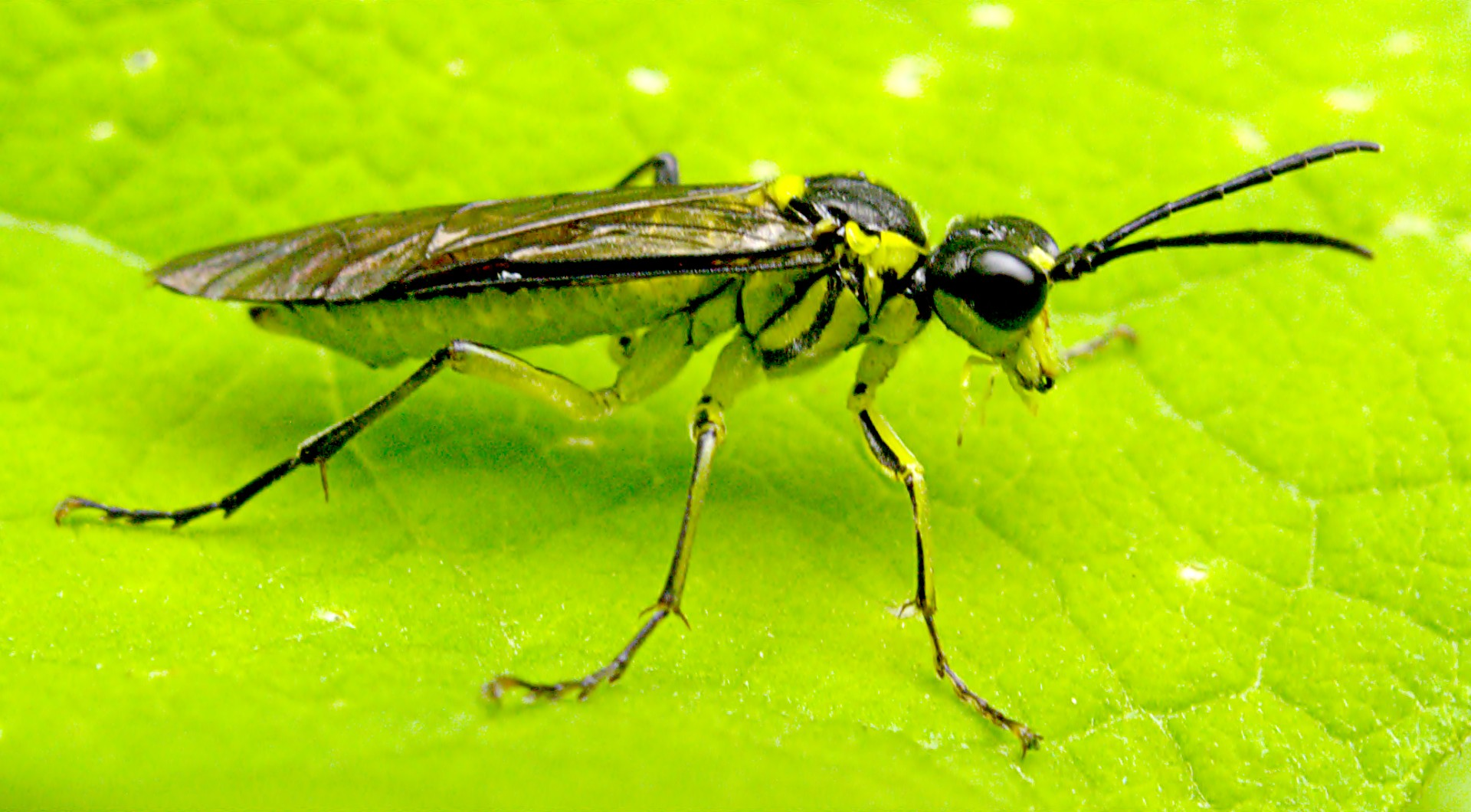
- Tenthredo mesomela

Scientific classification
- Kingdom: Animalia
- Phylum: Arthropoda
- Clade: Pancrustacea
- Class: Insecta
- Order: Hymenoptera
- Suborder: Symphyta
- Superfamily: Tenthredinoidea; Latreille, 1803

Type genus
- Tenthredo Linnaeus, 1758

Families
- Argidae Konow, 1890; Blasticotomidae Thomson, 1871; Cimbicidae W. Kirby, 1837; Diprionidae Rohwer, 1910 † Electrotomidae Rasnitsyn, 1977; Pergidae Rohwer, 1911; Tenthredinidae Latreille, 1803 † Xyelotomidae Rasnitsyn, 1968; Zenargidae Rohwer, 1918

= Tenthredinoidea =

Tenthredinoidea Temporal range: Cretaceous-Present

Superfamily of insects

The Tenthredinoidea are the dominant superfamily of sawflies within the Symphyta, containing some 8,400 species worldwide, primarily in the family Tenthredinidae. All known larvae are phytophagous, and a number are considered pests.

The included extant families share the distinctive features of a medially narrowed pronotum, paired protibial spurs, and the loss of the transverse mesonotal groove. The superfamily also includes two extinct families. Meicai and Haiyan (1998) identified 66 extant tribes and 17 subfamilies.

== Taxonomy ==
=== Families ===
- Argidae Konow, 1890 (59 genera, 898 spp.)
- Athaliidae Leach, 1817 (1 genus, 44 spp.)
- Blasticotomidae Thomson, 1871 (3 genera, 13 spp.)
- Cimbicidae W. Kirby, 1837 (16 genera, 182 spp.)
- Diprionidae Rohwer, 1910 (11 genera, 136 spp.)
- Pergidae Rohwer, 1911 (60 genera, 442 spp.)
- Tenthredinidae Latreille, 1803 (430 genera, 7,500 spp.)

== Bibliography ==
- Aguiar, Alexandre P.; Deans, Andrew R.; Engel, Michael S.; Forshage, Mattias; Huber, John T.; Jennings, John T.; Johnson, Norman F.; Lelej, Arkady S.; Longino, John T.; Lohrmann, Volker; Mikó, István; Ohl, Michael; Rasmussen, Claus; Taeger, Andreas; Yu, Dicky Sick Ki (30 August 2013). "Order Hymenoptera". Zootaxa. 3703 (1): 51–62. doi:10.11646/zootaxa.3703.1.12. PMID 26146682., in Zhang, Z.-Q. (ed.) Animal Biodiversity: An Outline of Higher-level Classification and Survey of Taxonomic Richness (Addenda 2013)
- Liston, Andrew; Knight, Guy; Sheppard, David; Broad, Gavin; Livermore, Laurence (29 August 2014). "Checklist of British and Irish Hymenoptera - Sawflies, 'Symphyta'". Biodiversity Data Journal. 2 (2) e1168. doi:10.3897/BDJ.2.e1168. PMC 4152835. PMID 25197241.
- Malagón-Aldana, L.A.; Smith, D.R.; Shinohara, A.; Vilhelmsen, L. (2021). "From Arge to Zenarge: adult morphology and phylogenetics of argid sawflies (Hymenoptera: Argidae)". Zoological Journal of the Linnean Society. 193 (3): 880–938. doi:10.1093/zoolinnean/zlaa170. (Erratum: doi:10.1093/zoolinnean/zlab028)
- Meicai, Wei; Haiyan, Nie (1998). "Generic list of Tenthredinoidea s. str. (Hymenoptera) in new systematic arrangement with synonyms and distribution data". Journal of Central-South Forestry College (in Chinese). 18 (3): 23–31.
