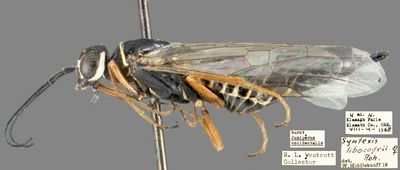
- Syntexis libocedrii

Scientific classification
- Kingdom: Animalia
- Phylum: Arthropoda
- Class: Insecta
- Order: Hymenoptera
- Clade: Unicalcarida
- Superfamily: Siricoidea
- Family: Anaxyelidae; Martynov 1925

Genera
- See text

= Anaxyelidae =

Anaxyelidae Temporal range: Middle Jurassic–Recent

Family of sawflies

Anaxyelidae is a family of incense cedar wood wasps in the order Hymenoptera. It contains only one living genus, Syntexis, which has only a single species, native to Western North America. Fossils of the family extend back to the Middle Jurassic, belonging to over a dozen extinct genera, with a particularly high diversity during the Early Cretaceous. Syntexis lay eggs in the sapwood of conifers, preferring recently burnt wood.

== Genera ==
These genera belong to the family Anaxyelidae:

Taxonomy after

- Subfamily Syntexinae
  - Syntexis Rohwer, 1915 Western North America, Recent
  - † Cretosyntexis Rasnitsyn & Martinez-Delclos, 2000 La Pedrera de Rubies Formation, Spain, Early Cretaceous (Barremian)
  - † Curiosyntexis Kopylov, 2019 Ola Formation Russia, Late Cretaceous (Campanian)
  - † Daosyntexis Kopylov, Rasnitsyn, Zhang & Zhang, 2020 Daohugou, China, Middle Jurassic (Callovian)
  - † Dolichosyntexis Kopylov, 2019 Zaza Formation, Russia, Early Cretaceous (Aptian)
  - † Eosyntexis Rasnitsyn, 1990 Purbeck Group, United Kingdom, Early Cretaceous (Berriasian) La Pedrera de Rubies Formation, Spain, Early Cretaceous (Barremian), Turga Formation, Russia, Aptian, Spanish amber, Early Cretaceous (Albian)
  - † Orthosyntexis J. Gao, Engel, Shih, & T. Gao, 2021 Burmese amber, Myanmar, Late Cretaceous (Cenomanian)
  - † Parasyntexis Kopylov, 2019 Khasurty, Zaza Formation, Russia, Early Cretaceous (Aptian)
  - † Sclerosyntexis Wang, Ren, Kopylov & Gao, 2020 Burmese amber, Myanmar, Late Cretaceous (Cenomanian)
- Subfamily Anaxyelinae
  - † Anasyntexis Rasnitsyn, 1968 Karabastau Formation, Middle/Late Jurassic (Callovian-Oxfordian)
  - † Anaxyela Martynov, 1925 Karabastau Formation, Middle/Late Jurassic (Callovian-Oxfordian)
  - † Brachysyntexis Rasnitsyn, 1969 Daohugou, China, Middle Jurassic (Callovian), Karabastau Formation, Middle/Late Jurassic (Callovian-Oxfordian), Yixian Formation, China, Aptian, Khasurty locality, Zaza Formation, Russia, Early Cretaceous (Aptian)
  - † Dolichostigma Rasnitsyn, 1968 Zaza Formation, Russia, Early Cretaceous (Aptian)
  - † Kempendaja Rasnitsyn, 1968 Khaya Formation, Russia, Late Jurassic (Tithonian)
  - † Kulbastavia Rasnitsyn, 1968 Karabastau Formation, Middle/Late Jurassic (Callovian-Oxfordian)
  - † Mangus Kopylov, 2019 Dzun-Bain Formation, Mongolia, Early Cretaceous (Aptian)
  - † Sphenosyntexis Rasnitzyn, 1969 Karabastau Formation, Middle/Late Jurassic (Callovian-Oxfordian)
  - † Syntexyela Rasnitsyn, 1968 Karabastau Formation, Middle/Late Jurassic (Callovian-Oxfordian), Yixian Formation, China, Aptian
  - † Urosyntexis Rasnitzyn, 1969 Karabastau Formation, Middle/Late Jurassic (Callovian-Oxfordian), Khasurty locality, Zaza Formation, Russia, Early Cretaceous (Aptian)
