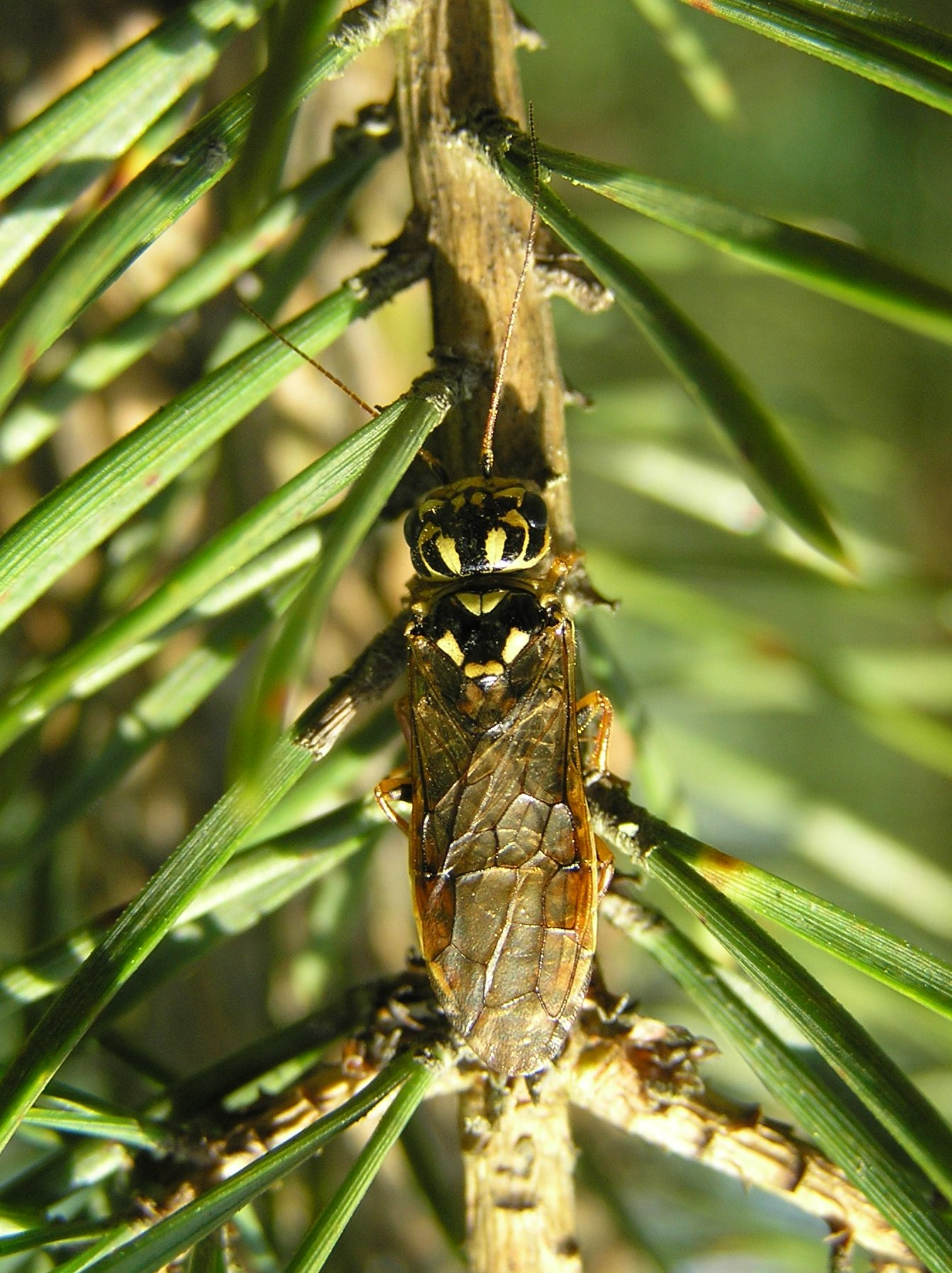
- Acantholyda nemoralis (Pamphiliidae)

Scientific classification
- Kingdom: Animalia
- Phylum: Arthropoda
- Class: Insecta
- Order: Hymenoptera
- Suborder: Symphyta
- Superfamily: Pamphilioidea; Cameron, 1890

Families
- Megalodontesidae Konow, 1897; Pamphiliidae Cameron, 1890 †Mirolydidae Wang, Rasnitsyn & Ren, 2017 †Xyelydidae Rasnitsyn, 1986

Synonyms
- Megalodontoidea Konow, 1897

= Pamphilioidea =

Pamphilioidea Temporal range: Cretaceous-Present

Superfamily of sawflies

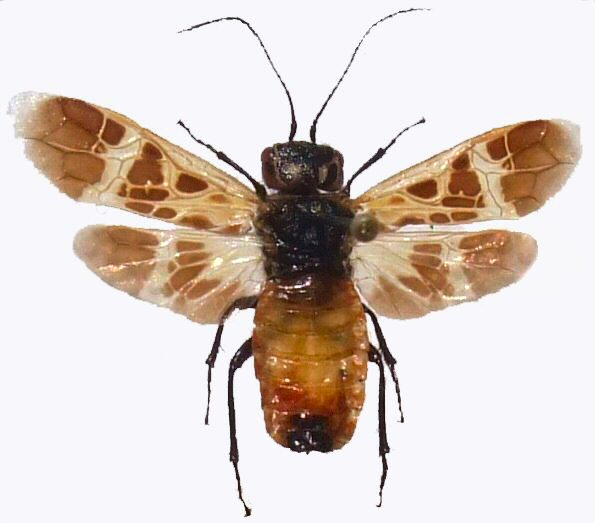
Caenolyda reticulata

The Pamphilioidea are a small superfamily within the Symphyta (the sawflies), containing some 250 living species restricted to the temperate regions of Eurasia and North America. These hymenopterans share the distinctive feature of a very large, almost prognathous head, which is widest ventrally.

The superfamily contains two extant families. The Pamphiliidae are the leaf-rolling or web-spinning sawflies such as Acantholyda, Neurotoma, and Pamphilius whose larvae eat plants such as conifers; the adults have simple filiform antennae. The Megalodontesidae include genera such as Megalodontes and several fossil groups. Their larvae eat herbaceous plants, while the adults have serrate or pectinate antennae.

== Bibliography ==
- Aguiar, Alexandre P.; Deans, Andrew R.; Engel, Michael S.; Forshage, Mattias; Huber, John T.; Jennings, John T.; Johnson, Norman F.; Lelej, Arkady S.; Longino, John T.; Lohrmann, Volker; Mikó, István; Ohl, Michael; Rasmussen, Claus; Taeger, Andreas; Yu, Dicky Sick Ki (30 August 2013). "Order Hymenoptera". Zootaxa. 3703 (1): 51–62. doi:10.11646/zootaxa.3703.1.12. PMID 26146682., in Zhang, Z.-Q. (ed.) Animal Biodiversity: An Outline of Higher-level Classification and Survey of Taxonomic Richness (Addenda 2013)
- Rasnitsyn, Alexandr P.; Zhang, Haichun & Wang, Bo (2006): Bizarre fossil insects: web-spinning sawflies of the genus Ferganolyda (Vespida, Pamphilioidea) from the Middle Jurassic of Daohugou, Inner Mongolia, China. Palaeontology 49(4): 907-916. doi:10.1111/j.1475-4983.2006.00574.x PDF fulltext
- Wang, Mei; Rasnitsyn, Alexandr P.; Li, Hu; Shih, Chungkun; Sharkey, Michael J.; Ren, Dong (June 2016). "Phylogenetic analyses elucidate the inter-relationships of Pamphilioidea (Hymenoptera, Symphyta)". Cladistics. 32 (3): 239–260. doi:10.1111/cla.12129. PMID 34736302. S2CID 59397749.
- Wang, M.; Rasnitsyn, A.P.; Yang, Z.; Shih, C.; Wang, B.; Ren, D. (2017). "Mirolydidae, a new family of Jurassic pamphilioid sawfly (Hymenoptera) highlighting mosaic evolution of lower Hymenoptera". Scientific Reports. 7 43944. doi:10.1038/srep43944. PMC 5339686. PMID 28266631.
