= Maulden Wood =

Woodland in Bedfordshire, England

Coordinates: 52°02′19″N 0°26′38″W

Maulden Wood and Pennyfather's Hill
- Site of Special Scientific Interest
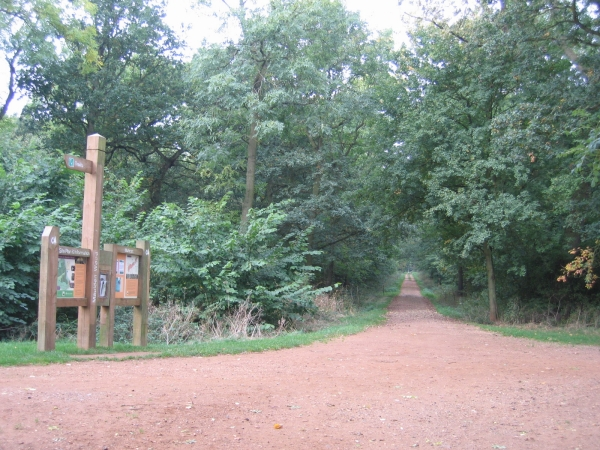
- Location of Maulden Wood and Pennyfather's Hill.
- Area of search: Bedfordshire
- Grid reference: TL170390
- Interest: Biological
- Area: 148.8 ha (368 acres)
- Notification date: 1986
- Location map: Magic Map

Maulden Wood is a woodland situated in Bedfordshire, England, near the village of Maulden, on the greensand ridge that stretches from Leighton Buzzard to Gamlingay. It includes Maulden Wood and Pennyfather's Hill, a 148.8 hectare, biological Site of Special Scientific Interest (SSSI).

== Overview ==
Maulden Wood is classed as a semi-natural broadleaf woodland, on acidic grassland and includes some conifer plantations. Paths through the lead can be reached from Maulden Church, through Church Field, and from the A6 road layby through the wood. There are grasslands in the centre of the wood. They are managed by the Greensand Trust and Forestry England.

== Scientific interest ==
Much of Maulden Wood is designated as an (SSSI) for the acidic grassland and heathland interest, and wildlife includes badger sets, foxes, and barn owls. The site is important for invertebrates and plants which are indicative of the varied clay and sandy gravel soil. One notable invertebrate is limax cinereoniger, a mollusc that is also indicative of unmanaged ancient woodlands. The rare Wild Service Tree Sorbus torminalis also grows in the drier places deep in the wood.

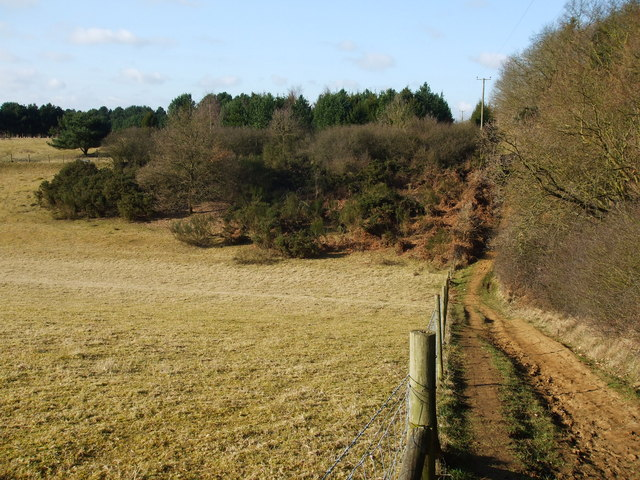
The greensand ridge, at the woodland edge.

The northern end of the wood is also an SSSI because of its importance as one of Bedfordshire's largest remnants of ancient woodland in addition to the nearby King's Wood. Maulden wood is green most of the year round due to the large percentage of pine and other evergreen trees. Hedgerows around the perimeter contain bindweed, sticky willy, honeysuckle, and trumpet flowers (Bindweed). Snowdrops and cowslips grow prolifically in the early spring. In the mid to late spring, bluebells can be found in the middle of the wood and on the waysides. The southern end of the wood is sometimes called Pennyfather's wood. It is situated on greensand, whereas the rest of Maulden Wood is situated on a cap of glacial boulder clay.

There also some rare species of sawfly (Symphyta, Pamphilius sylvarum and Caliroa cinxia, which feed on the resident oak (Quercus) trees. Another sawfly, Pamphilius gyllenhali, has been recorded in the wood, which feeds on willow Salix alba. There are also notable species from several major invertebrate groups including the beetles, dragonflies and butterflies.

== History ==
The north of Maulden Wood includes several Roman and Iron Age archaeological sites along Limbersey Lane and on the site of Limbersey Farm. There are also sites within the wood of medieval origin, especially on the north end of the wood, and on the west (Maulden) end of the wood.

The north end of the lay by on the A6 is the site of the 1961 A6 murder.

== Access ==
Maulden Wood is open to the public all year round. It is accessed from the Deadman's Hill layby on the A6 adjacent to the wood. and from Maulden Church Meadow.
