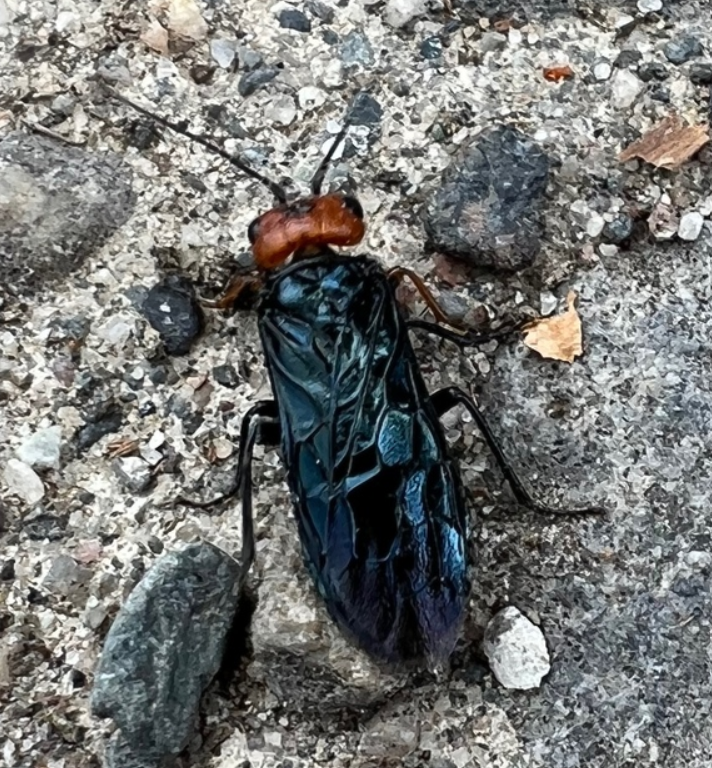

Scientific classification
- Kingdom: Animalia
- Phylum: Arthropoda
- Class: Insecta
- Order: Hymenoptera
- Suborder: Symphyta
- Family: Pamphiliidae
- Genus: Acantholyda
- Species: A. erythrocephala

Binomial name
- Acantholyda erythrocephala (Linnaeus, 1758)

Synonyms
- Acantholyda grangeoni Riou, 1999; Tenthredo erythrocephala Linnaeus, 1758

= Acantholyda erythrocephala =

Species of sawfly

Acantholyda erythrocephala is a species of sawfly in the family Pamphiliidae commonly known as the red-headed pine sawfly or the pine false webworm. Native to Europe, it has been introduced into North America where it has become invasive.

== Description ==
Fully-grown larvae of A. erythrocephala have yellowish heads spotted with dark brown, and greenish-grey bodies with purplish longitudinal stripes on the top and sides.

== Distribution ==
The species is native to Europe and was introduced to North America in 1925, where it has become widespread in northern parts of the United States and Canada, where it is a major pest of white pine (Pinus strobus). Other trees infested include Scots pine (Pinus sylvestris) and red pine (Pinus resinosa).

== Life cycle ==
Adults emerge in late spring, and after mating, the female lays eggs on the previous year's needles. The eggs hatch in about two weeks and the larvae move to the base of the old needles and start to feed, only moving on to new needles if they exhaust the supply of old ones. The larvae construct silken webbing inside which they live in tubes, chewing off needles and pulling them inside the tubes for consumption; the tubes soon fill up with bits of needles, cast skins and frass. Older larvae construct their own individual tubes. By the end of June the larvae are fully developed and fall to the ground where they create earthen cells in which they spend the winter.

== Ecology ==
In Europe, the larvae of Acantholyda erythrocephala are attacked by the parasitoid Tachinid fly Myxexoristops hertingi. In 2002, 2003 and 2004, in an effort to initiate a biological control programme in North America, pupae of this fly were imported from Italy and released in Ontario in an area of red pine (Pinus resinosa) infested with sawfly larvae. Because populations of sawfly larvae have large natural swings, the impact of the parasitoid fly was difficult to evaluate. Another biocontrol measure investigated involved using an aqueous suspension of Neodiprion abietis nucleopolyhedravirus (NeabNPV); this reduced the survival rate of the sawfly larvae by about 50%, but its impact was again inconclusive.

Defoliation by the sawfly larvae does not directly kill a tree, but it weakens it, allowing pathogens and pests such as bark beetles to attack, and these may result in mortality.
