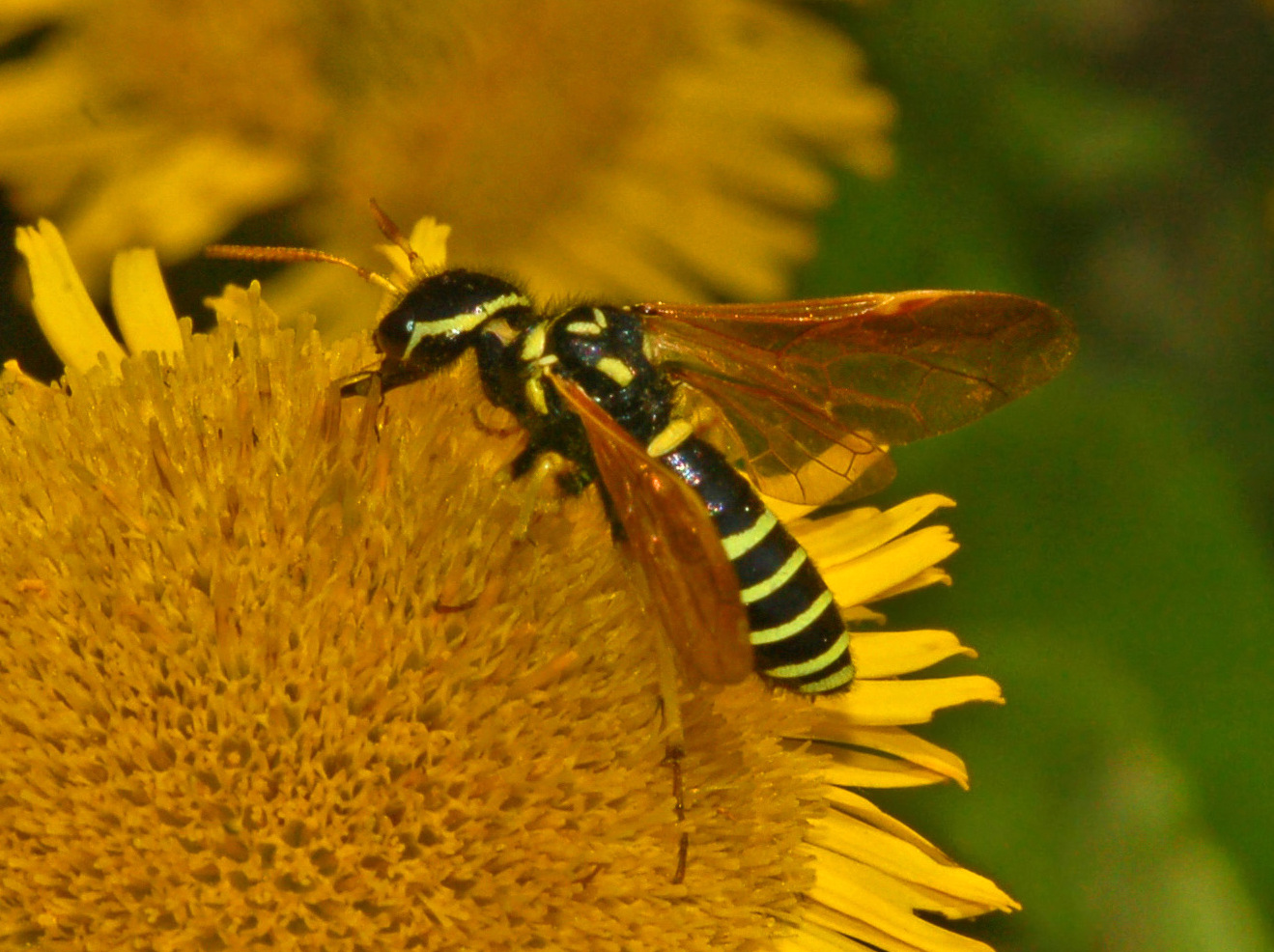
- Possible M. bucephalus in Genova, in Italy

Scientific classification
- Domain: Eukaryota
- Kingdom: Animalia
- Phylum: Arthropoda
- Class: Insecta
- Order: Hymenoptera
- Suborder: Symphyta
- Family: Megalodontesidae
- Genus: Megalodontes
- Species: M. bucephalus

Binomial name
- Megalodontes bucephalus (Klug, 1824)

= Megalodontes bucephalus =

Species of sawfly

Megalodontes bucephalus is a dubious species of Symphyta, of the Megalodontesidae family, and Megalodontesinae subfamily. The reason it is a dubious species is that it is restricted to the Iberian Peninsula and the Baleares Islands.
