= Ulteramus =

Ulteramus Temporal range: Eocene

Scientific classification
- Kingdom: Animalia
- Phylum: Arthropoda
- Clade: Pancrustacea
- Class: Insecta
- Order: Hymenoptera
- Suborder: Symphyta
- Family: Pamphiliidae
- Genus: †Ulteramus
- Species: †U. republicensis

Binomial name
- †Ulteramus republicensis Archibald & Rasnitsyn, 2015

Extinct genus of sawfly in the family Pamphiliidae

Ulteramus is an extinct genus of parasitic sawfly in the family Pamphiliidae. The genus is solely known from an Eocene fossil found in North America. At the time of its description the new genus was composed of a single species, Ulteramus republicensis.

== History and classification ==
Ulteramus republicensis is known only from one fossil, the part side of the holotype, specimen number UWBM 77532, which is housed in the collections of the Burke Museum of Natural History in Seattle, Washington. The specimen is preserved as a compression fossil in silty yellow to grayish shale, which was recovered from outcrops of the Tom Thumb Tuff member of the Klondike Mountain Formation in 1993 by Wesley Wehr. The formation is approximately Early Eocene, Ypresian in age, being radiometrically dated as 49.4 million years old. Ulteramus was first studied by the paleoentomologists S. Bruce Archibald from Simon Fraser University in Burnaby, British Columbia and Alexandr Rasnitsyn of the A. A. Borissiak Paleontological Institute. Their 2015 type description of the new genus and species was published in the journal Canadian Entomologist. The genus name Ulteramus was coined by the researchers as a combination of the Latin ramus meaning "branch" and ulter meaning "on the further side". The specific epithet republicensis is a reference to the type locality of the species in Republic, Washington.

Areas of the Ulteramus wing venation are similar to members of the pamphiliid subfamilies Pamphiliinae and Cephalciinae. The two subfamilies are distinguished from each other on the condition of the wing apex. Longitudinal corrugation of the wing apex is seen in Pamphiliinae, while Cephalciinae genera have an irregularly coriaceous wing apex. The described fossil of Ulteramus is missing the majority of the wing apex area, but the small portion that is preserved seems to be smooth. However the placement of the junction between the Subcostal2 and Radius vein distinguishes Ulteramus from all other pamphiliid genera. Due to the incomplete nature of the fossil, placement of the genus into any of the three described subfamilies or creation of a new subfamily was not possible.

U. republicensis was one of three sawfly species described in Archibald & Rasnitsyn's 2015 paper, the other two being Ypresiosirex orthosemos and Cuspilongus cachecreekensis, both from the McAbee fossil beds in south central British Columbia.

== Description ==
The single described wing of U. republicensis is incomplete, missing the very basal and apical sections. Additionally the area of the wing between the Radial and Costal veins is either damaged or folded, obscuring vein details. The wing has an even darkened tone to the membrane with a large pterostigma hardened by sclerotisation. The wing as preserved has a length of 7.3 mm (0.29 in) and a width of approximately 3 mm (0.12 in). The placement of the join between the Sc2 and R veins nearer to the wing base is not seen in other pamphiliids, resembling that of Xyelidae genera. The Radius vein segment 4 is longer than seen in other pamphiliids, and the vein segment 1 is present, though it isn't well preserved, obscuring some of the morphological details. The short segment 1 is something not seen in the genera Caenolyda, Pseudocephaleia, and Kelidoptera.

== Paleoenvironment ==
Paleoenvironments

The Republic sites are part of a larger fossil site system collectively known as the Eocene Okanagan Highlands. The highlands, including the Early Eocene formations between Driftwood Canyon at the north and Republic at the south, have been described as one of the "Great Canadian Lagerstätten" based on the diversity, quality and unique nature of the paleofloral and paleofaunal biotas that are preserved. The highlands temperate biome preserved across a large transect of lakes recorded many of the earliest appearances of modern genera, while also documenting the last stands of ancient lines. The warm temperate highland floras in association with downfaulted lacustrine basins and active volcanism are noted to have no exact modern equivalents. This is due to the more seasonally equitable conditions of the Early Eocene, resulting in much lower seasonal temperature shifts. However, the highlands have been compared to the upland ecological islands of the Virunga Mountains within the African rift valleys Albertine Rift.

The Klondike Mountain Formation represents an upland lake system that was surrounded by a warm temperate ecosystem with nearby volcanism dating from during and just after the early Eocene climatic optimum. The Okanagan Highlands likely had a mesic upper microthermal to lower mesothermal climate, in which winter temperatures rarely dropped low enough for snow, and which were seasonably equitable. The paleoforest surrounding the lakes have been described as precursors to the modern temperate broadleaf and mixed forests of Eastern North America and Eastern Asia. Based on the fossil biotas the lakes were higher and cooler than the coeval coastal forests preserved in the Puget Group and Chuckanut Formation of Western Washington, which are described as lowland tropical forest ecosystems. Estimates of the paleoelevation range between 0.7–1.2 km (0.43–0.75 mi) higher than the coastal forests. This is consistent with the paleoelevation estimates for the lake systems, which range between 1.1–2.9 km (1,100–2,900 m), which is similar to the modern elevation 0.8 km (0.50 mi), but higher.

Estimates of the mean annual temperature have been derived from climate leaf analysis multivariate program (CLAMP) analysis and leaf margin analysis (LMA) of the Republic paleoflora. The CLAMP results after multiple linear regressions gave a mean annual temperature of approximately 8.0 °C (46.4 °F), with the LMA giving 9.2 ± 2.0 °C (48.6 ± 3.6 °F). A bioclimatic-based estimate based on modern relatives of the taxa found at Republic suggested mean annual temperatures around 13.5 ± 2.2 °C (56.3 ± 4.0 °F). This is lower than the mean annual temperature estimates given for the coastal Puget Group, which is estimated to have been between 15–18.6 °C (59.0–65.5 °F). The bioclimatic analysis for Republic suggests a mean annual precipitation amount of 115 ± 39 cm (45 ± 15 in).
