= Spruce sawflies =

Name for various sawfly species

Spruce sawflies are various sawfly species found in North America that feed on spruce. There are multiple species of sawflies known as spruce sawflies, including species in the genera Gilpinia, Pikonema, Pristiphora, and Cephalcia. Each kind of sawfly attacks particular parts of the spruce as larvae during different times of the year.

== Yellow-headed spruce sawfly, Pikonema alaskensis ==
The yellow-headed spruce sawfly, Pikonema alaskensis, is widely known in the northern United States and Canada as a destructive pest of spruce. It attacks white, black, Norway, and Colorado blue spruces. The larvae at first prefer new foliage, but after becoming about half-grown, old needles are included in their diet too. Young plantations become susceptible a few growing seasons after establishment.

The insect overwinters underground as a larva in a dark-brown papery cocoon encrusted with soil (Rose and Lindquist 1985). In the spring, the cocoon changes into a pupa, from which the adult emerges, mainly in May or June at about the time the spruce bud scales are sloughed off. The spring-emerging females lay their eggs in shallow slits at the base of expanding needles, generally 1 per needle. Hatching takes place in 6 to 14 days, and the larvae feed in groups on the new needles until only short, brown stubs are left, after which the larvae move back on the twig to feed on the older needles until they are full-grown—usually in late July or early August. Larvae drop to the ground and spin overwintering cocoons. A single generation occurs per season.

Larvae are about 20 mm long when fully grown, and have chestnut-brown to reddish-brown heads. The body is yellowish-green above, lighter beneath, with a double row of broad, brown to olive-green stripes along the back, with another green stripe on each side. A small spot occurs near the legs on all but the rearmost section of the body.

In spite of the large numbers of parasites that attack this sawfly, planted spruce can be heavily damaged. Any insecticide would maximize larval mortality when applied about 10 days after bud caps have been shed, but when only few trees are infested, the larvae can be picked off by hand. Other than in young plantations, this sawfly generally causes little or no mortality of trees in spite of its widespread presence.

== Green-headed spruce sawfly, Pikonema dimmockii ==
The green-headed spruce sawfly, Pikonema dimmockii, is closely related to the yellow-headed spruce sawfly, with which it has a similar distribution, but occurring most commonly from Saskatchewan eastward. Damage by this insect is rarely seen, and the life cycle is similar to that of the yellow-headed spruce sawfly.

== Little spruce sawfly, Pristiphora lena ==
The larvae of the little spruce sawfly, Pristiphora lena, feed on spruce needles in June and July. The insect has been reported from Ontario and Newfoundland, but damage has been inconsequential. The larvae are black-headed until almost fully grown (about 10 mm long) when the head colour changes to reddish brown. The life history is similar to that of the other spruce sawflies.

== Spruce webspinning sawflies ==
A number of webspinning sawflies feed on spruce, but most of them are rare and solitary feeders, Cephalcia fascipennis being the most common. It occasionally causes damage to ornamental spruce trees or hedges across Canada and the northeastern United States. The larvae overwinter in cells in the ground and pupate in the spring. The adults soon emerge and the female lays green cylindrical eggs singly or in end-to-end rows of 2 to 4 on the needle. On hatching, the larvae construct shelters of silk and excreta at the crotch of a twig and branch. The larvae forage from these shelters by cutting the older needles and eating them from the base outwards, usually leaving the tips of the needles which may be incorporated into the shelters. Larvae of this family typically have elongate antennae, bear a pair of jointed appendages at the posterior end, and lack abdominal legs. The colour is variable, but the head is usually dark and the body brownish with a reddish line along the back. Full-grown larvae, about 25 mm long, drop to the ground to overwinter.
