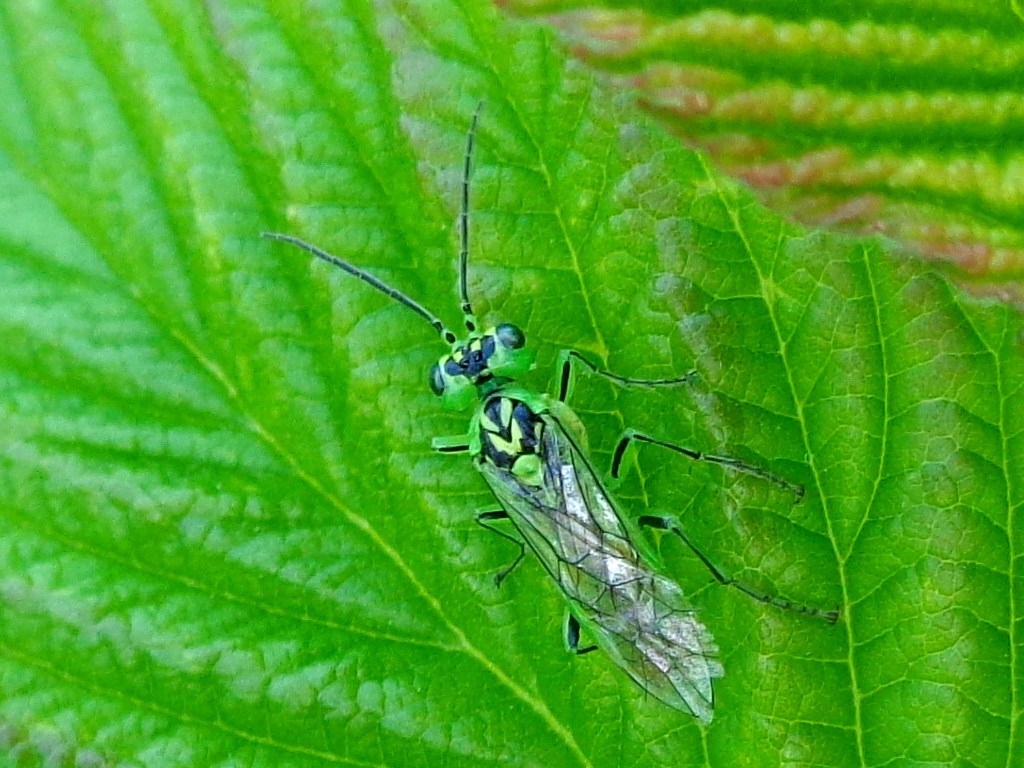

Scientific classification
- Domain: Eukaryota
- Kingdom: Animalia
- Phylum: Arthropoda
- Class: Insecta
- Order: Hymenoptera
- Suborder: Symphyta
- Family: Tenthredinidae
- Genus: Rhogogaster
- Species: R. chlorosoma

Binomial name
- Rhogogaster chlorosoma (Benson, 1943)

Synonyms
- Tenthredo chlorosoma

= Rhogogaster chlorosoma =

Species of sawfly

Rhogogaster chlorosoma is a species of sawfly in the family Tenthredinidae.

== Description ==
Rhogogaster chlorosoma can reach a length of 10–13 millimetres (0.39–0.51 in). It is one of the various green sawflies with a variable black pattern, but in this sawfly the black markings on the top of the abdomen are absent or quite reduced. Like other sawflies, this species lack the slender "wasp-waist" between the thorax and abdomen.

Similar species are Rhogogaster viridis, that shows evident black marks on the upper surface of the abdomen and Rhogogaster punctulata, bearing black dots along the sides of the abdominal segments.

Adults can mostly be encountered from May through July. They mainly feed on pollen and nectar of Heracleum sphondylium as well as small insects. The nocturnal larvae are polyphagous, feeding on the leaves of a variety of woody and herbaceous plants, mainly Sorbus, Quercus robur, Salix, Corylus avellana, Stellaria, Filipendula ulmaria, Alnus glutinosa, Rubus and Populus.

== Distribution ==
It is widespread in most of Europe.

== Habitat ==
This species prefers hedgerows and vegetated mountain areas.
