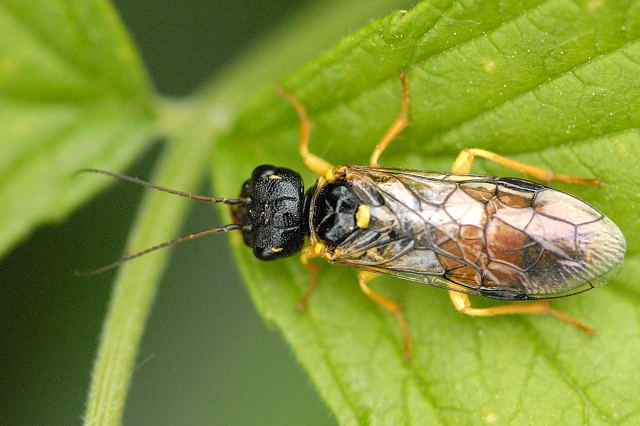
- Pamphilius hortorum Ardennes

Scientific classification
- Kingdom: Animalia
- Phylum: Arthropoda
- Class: Insecta
- Order: Hymenoptera
- Suborder: Symphyta
- Family: Pamphiliidae
- Genus: Pamphilius
- Species: P. hortorum

Binomial name
- Pamphilius hortorum (Klug, 1808)

= Pamphilius hortorum =

Species of insect

Pamphilius hortorum, the raspberry spinner, is a Palearctic species of sawfly. It feeds on raspberry leaves and, as with other leaf-rolling sawfly species, larvae develop in the rolled leaf tube.
