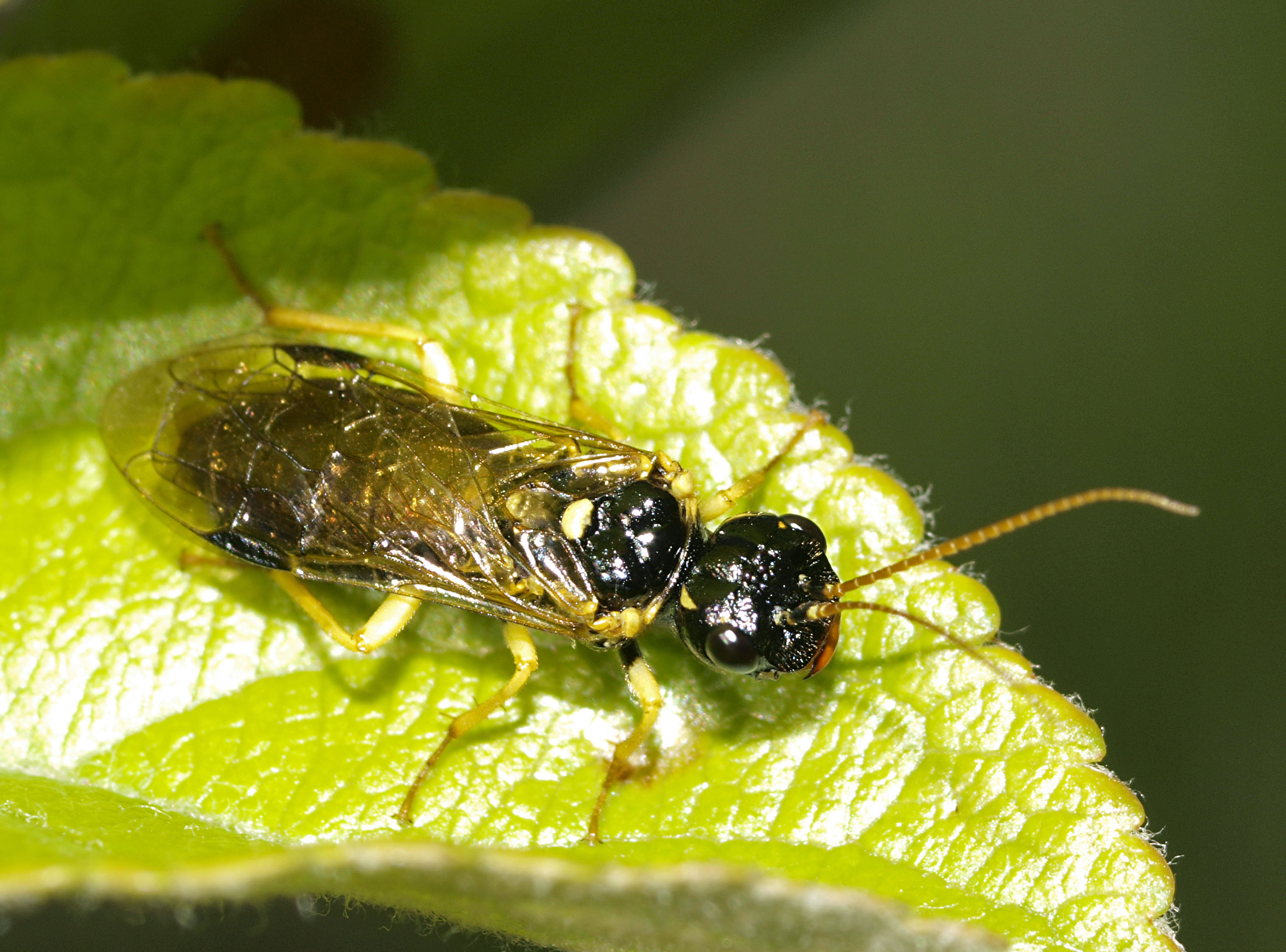
- Pamphilius sylvaticus Denmark

Scientific classification
- Kingdom: Animalia
- Phylum: Arthropoda
- Class: Insecta
- Order: Hymenoptera
- Suborder: Symphyta
- Family: Pamphiliidae
- Genus: Pamphilius
- Species: P. sylvaticus

Binomial name
- Pamphilius sylvaticus (Linnaeus, 1758)

= Pamphilius sylvaticus =

Species of insect

Pamphilius sylvaticus is a Palearctic species of sawfly.
