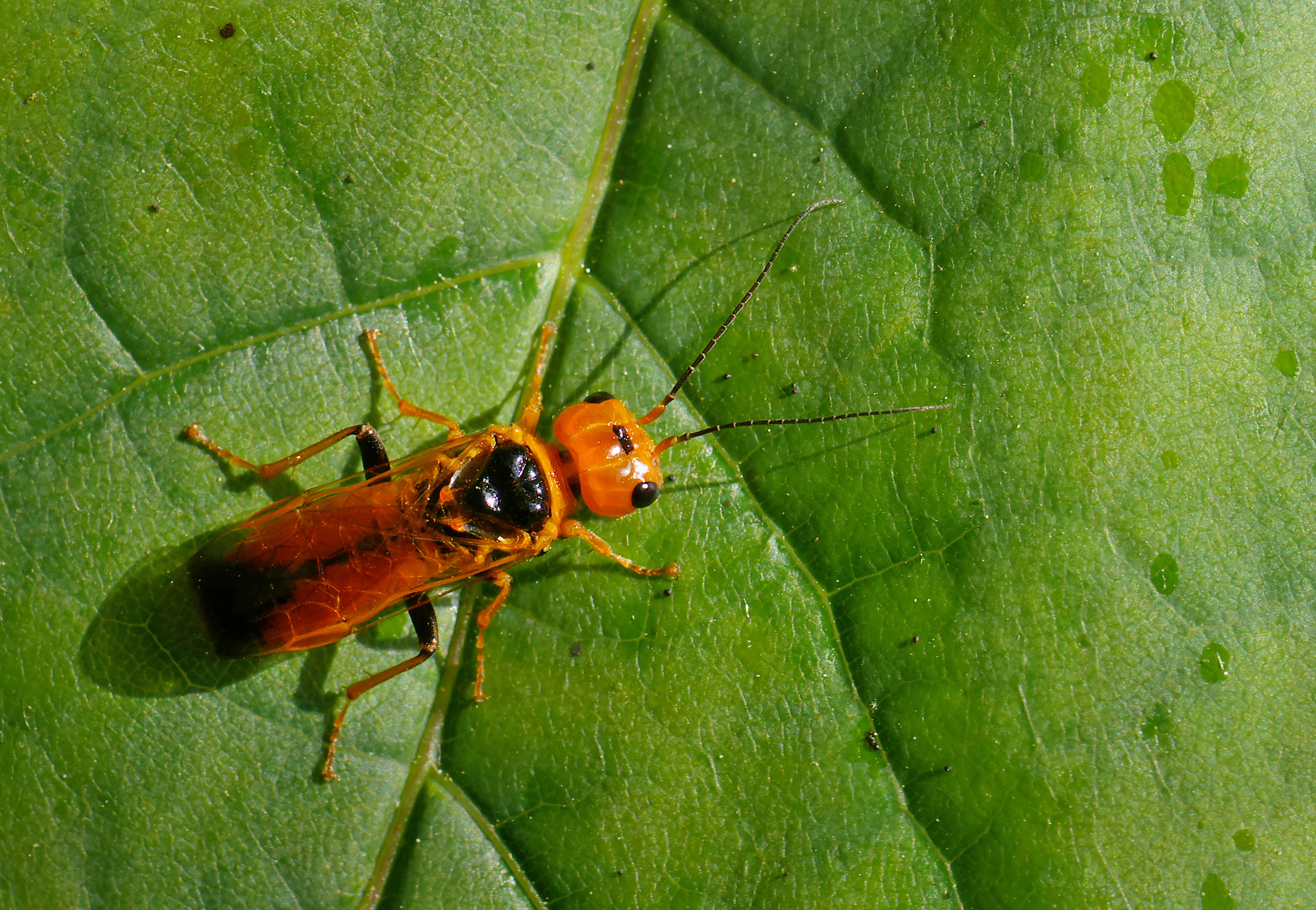
- Pamphilius betulae Belgium

Scientific classification
- Kingdom: Animalia
- Phylum: Arthropoda
- Class: Insecta
- Order: Hymenoptera
- Suborder: Symphyta
- Family: Pamphiliidae
- Genus: Pamphilius
- Species: P. betulae

Binomial name
- Pamphilius betulae (Linnaeus, 1758)

= Pamphilius betulae =

Species of insect

Pamphilius betulae is a Palearctic species of sawfly.
