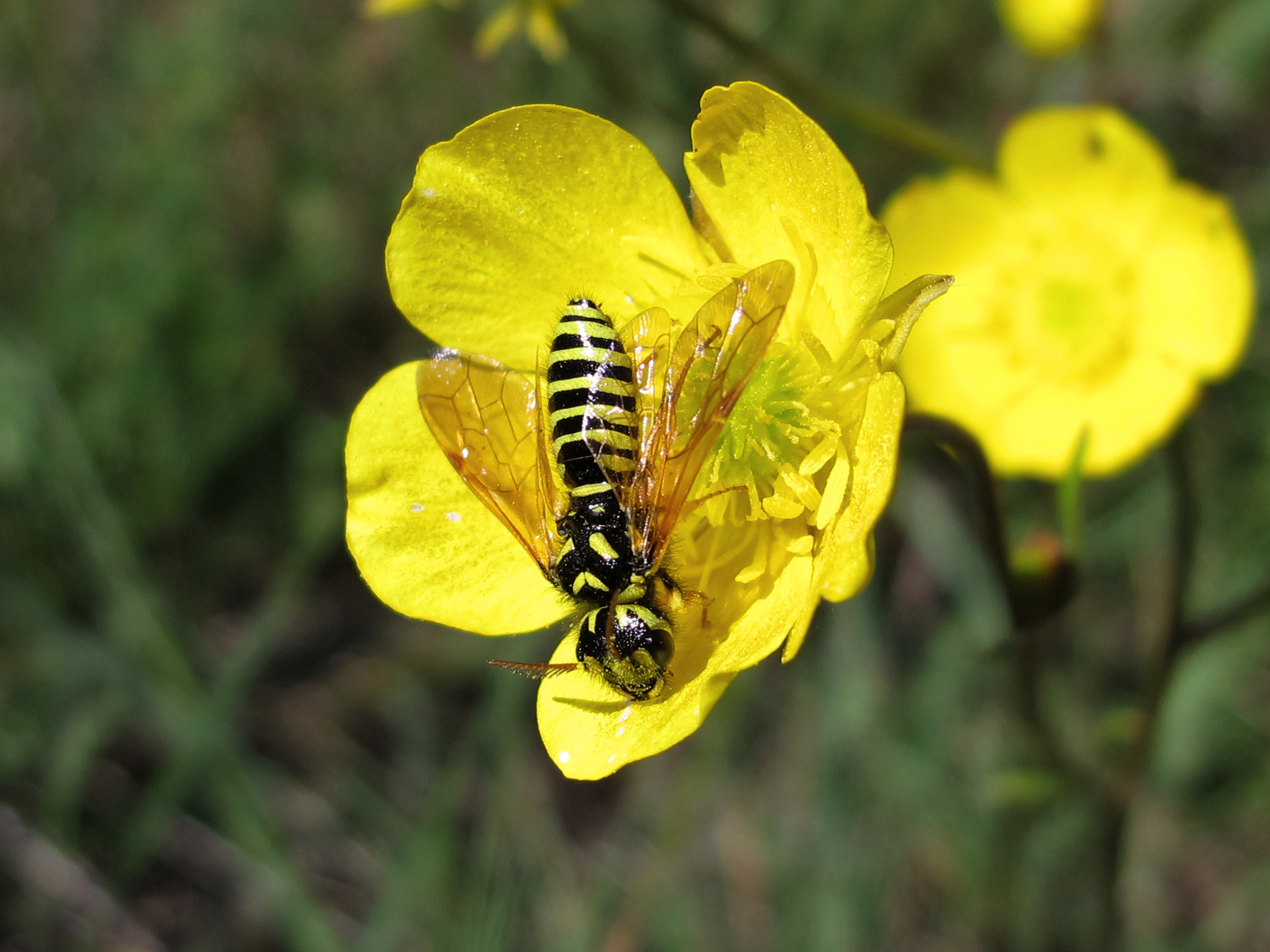

Scientific classification
- Kingdom: Animalia
- Phylum: Arthropoda
- Class: Insecta
- Order: Hymenoptera
- Suborder: Symphyta
- Family: Megalodontesidae
- Genus: Megalodontes
- Species: M. capitalatus

Binomial name
- Megalodontes capitalatus (Konow, 1904)

= Megalodontes capitalatus =

Species of sawflies

Megalodontes capitalatus is a species of sawflies, of the family Megalodontesidae. It is found in Spain.
