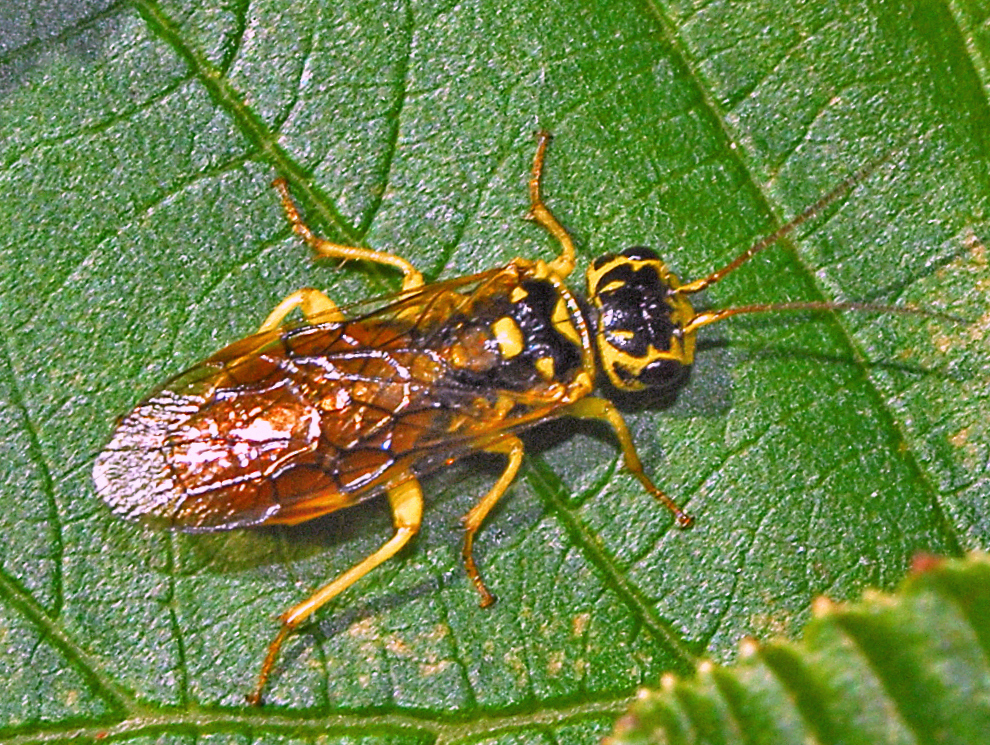
- Pamphilius cf. histrio. Dorsal view

Scientific classification
- Kingdom: Animalia
- Phylum: Arthropoda
- Class: Insecta
- Order: Hymenoptera
- Suborder: Symphyta
- Family: Pamphiliidae
- Genus: Pamphilius
- Species: P. histrio

Binomial name
- Pamphilius histrio Latreille, 1811

Synonyms
- Lyda histrio Latreille, 1812

= Pamphilius histrio =

Species of sawfly

Pamphilius histrio is a species of leaf-rolling sawflies within the Symphyta belonging to the family Pamphiliidae.

== Distribution ==
This species is present in most of Europe (Austria, Belgium, United Kingdom, Central European Russia, Czech Republic, Denmark, Estonia, Finland, France, Germany, Hungary, Italy, Latvia, Norway, Slovakia, Spain, Switzerland and Netherlands).

== Description ==
Pamphilius histrio can reach a length of about 13 millimetres (0.51 in). Head and thorax are black with yellowish markings. Legs are yellow and wings are transparent.

== Biology ==
Larvae feed on Populus tremula.
