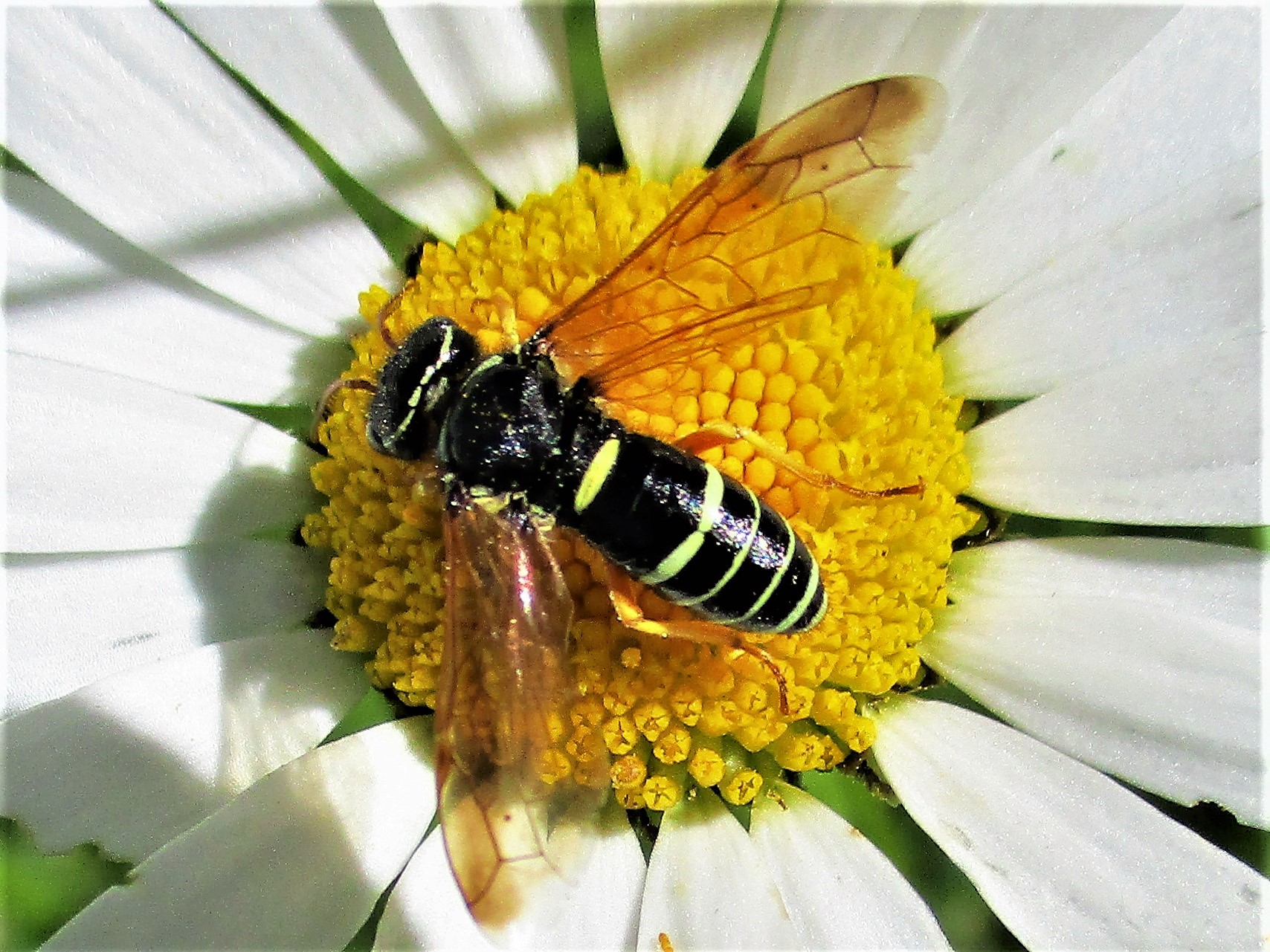
- Individual of M. plagiocephalus feeding

Scientific classification
- Kingdom: Animalia
- Phylum: Arthropoda
- Class: Insecta
- Order: Hymenoptera
- Suborder: Symphyta
- Family: Megalodontesidae
- Genus: Megalodontes
- Species: M. plagiocephalus

Binomial name
- Megalodontes plagiocephalus (Fabricius, 1804)

Synonyms
- Suva planina (Fabricius, 1804)

= Megalodontes plagiocephalus =

Species of sawflies

Megalodontes plagiocephalus is a species of sawfly native to Europe.
