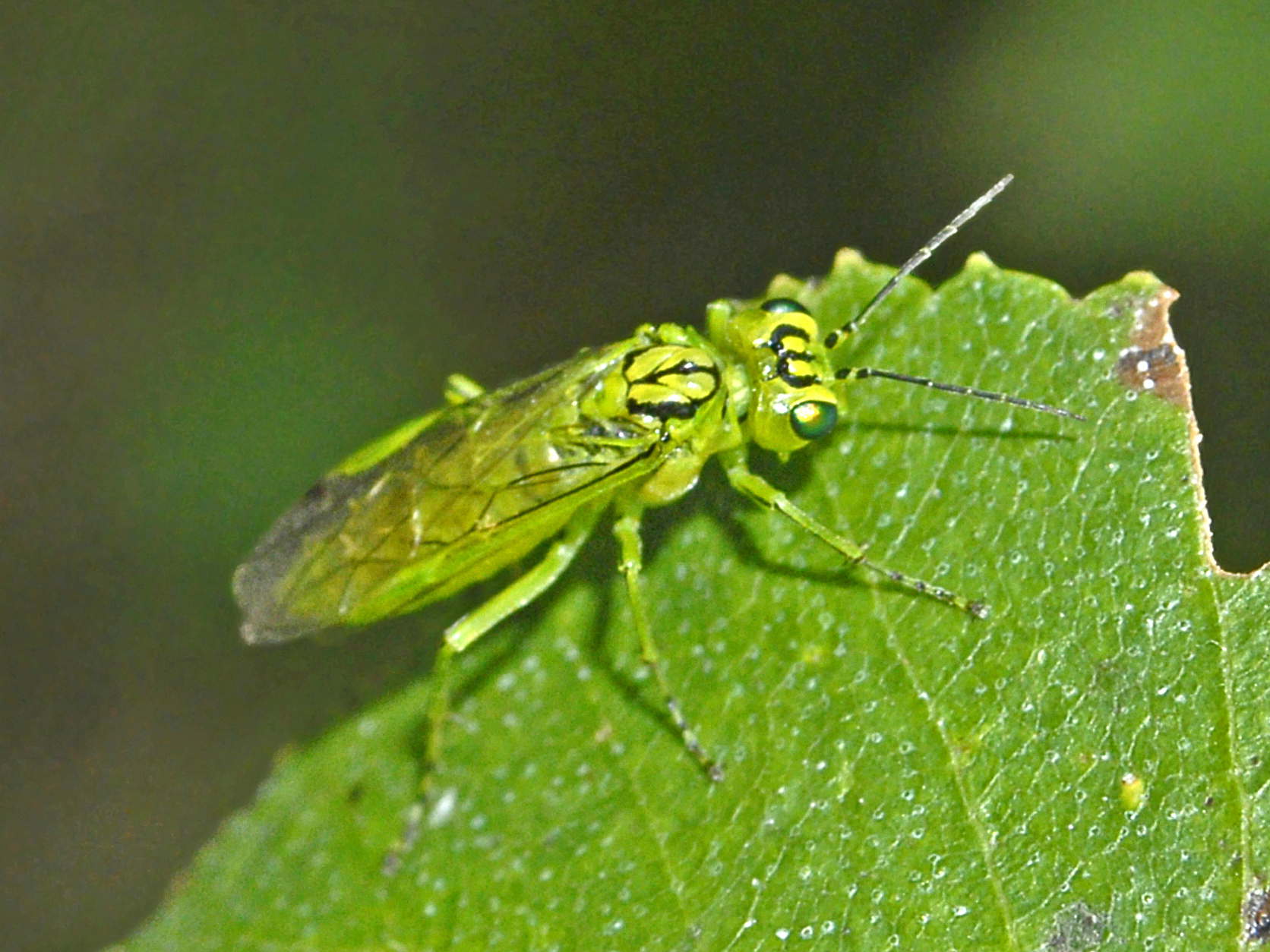
- Rhogogaster punctulata

Scientific classification
- Domain: Eukaryota
- Kingdom: Animalia
- Phylum: Arthropoda
- Class: Insecta
- Order: Hymenoptera
- Suborder: Symphyta
- Family: Tenthredinidae
- Subfamily: Tenthredininae
- Tribe: Tenthredinini
- Genus: Rhogogaster; Konow, 1884

= Rhogogaster =

Genus of sawflies

Rhogogaster is a genus of sawflies in the family Tenthredinidae.

== Species ==
- Rhogogaster californica (Norton, 1862)
- Rhogogaster carpatica (Zhelochovtsev, 1988)
- Rhogogaster chambersi Benson, 1947
- Rhogogaster chlorosoma (Benson, 1943)
- Rhogogaster convergens Malaise, 1931
- Rhogogaster dryas (Benson, 1943)
- Rhogogaster gayuboi Llorente, 1988
- Rhogogaster genistae Benson, 1949
- Rhogogaster kudiana Rohwer, 1925
- Rhogogaster nigriventris Malaise, 1931
- Rhogogaster nishijimai Togashi, 2001
- Rhogogaster opacella Mocsary, 1909
- Rhogogaster picta (Klug, 1814)
- Rhogogaster punctulata (Klug, 1814)
- Rhogogaster rishiriana Togashi, 2001
- Rhogogaster shinoharai Togashi, 2001
- Rhogogaster viridis (Linnaeus, 1758)
