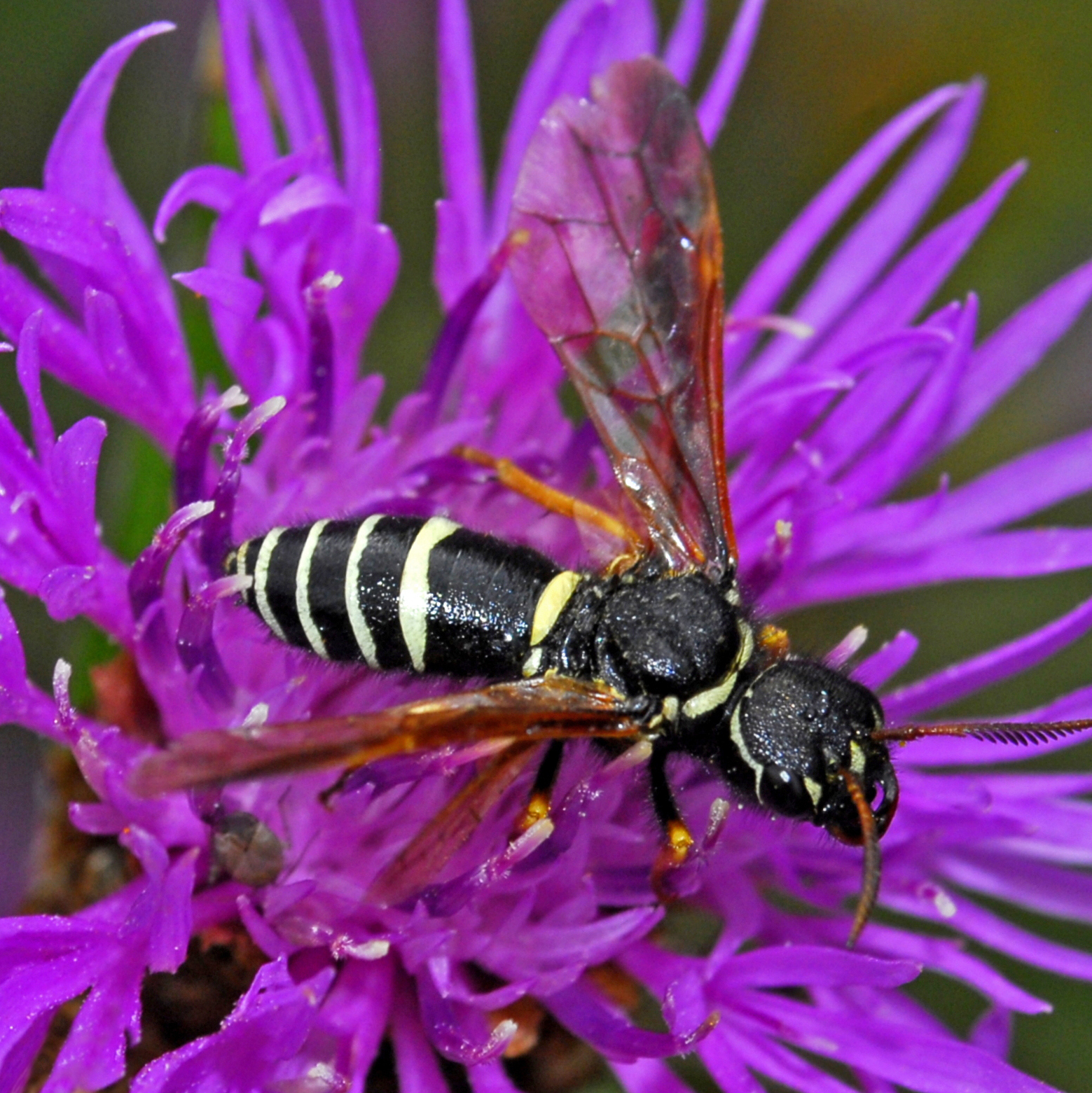
- Megalodontes cephalotes

Scientific classification
- Kingdom: Animalia
- Phylum: Arthropoda
- Class: Insecta
- Order: Hymenoptera
- Suborder: Symphyta
- Family: Megalodontesidae
- Genus: Megalodontes
- Species: M. cephalotes

Binomial name
- Megalodontes cephalotes (Fabricius, 1781)

Synonyms
- Megalodontes klugii (Leach, 1817); Tarpa klugii Leach, 1817; Tarpa spissicornis Klug, 1824; Tenthredo cephalotes Fabricius, 1781

= Megalodontes cephalotes =

Species of sawfly

Megalodontes cephalotes is a species of sawflies within the Symphyta belonging to the family Megalodontesidae.

== Distribution and habitat ==
This species is restricted to the regions of Europe (Andorra, Austria, Belgium, Bosnia and Herzegovina, Bulgaria, Croatia, Czech Republic, France, Germany, Italy, North Macedonia, Poland, Romania, Russia, Slovakia, Slovenia, Spain, Switzerland, Yugoslavia). It is a typically mountainous and alpine species, but it is also present in the lowlands. It inhabits south-facing warm slopes and dry grasslands, at an elevation up to 2,400 metres (7,900 ft) above sea level.

== Description ==
Megalodontes cephalotes can reach a length of 8–12 millimetres (0.31–0.47 in). These rather rare sawflies have a black glossy body with narrow light yellow bands on the abdomen. Pronotum shows a yellow upper margin. The head is large, the antennae are pectinate, with darkened flabelli towards the apex. The wings are reddish.

== Biology ==
Adults can be found from May to July, mainly on white and yellow inflorescences. They feed on pollen, nectar and honeydew, while young larvae feed gregariously on a few flowering plants (Laserpitium, Seseli and Peucedanum species).
