= Pamphilius sylvarum =

Scientific classification
- Domain: Eukaryota
- Kingdom: Animalia
- Phylum: Arthropoda
- Class: Insecta
- Order: Hymenoptera
- Suborder: Symphyta
- Family: Pamphiliidae
- Genus: Pamphilius
- Species: P. sylvarum

Binomial name
- Pamphilius sylvarum (Stephens, 1835)

Species of sawfly

Pamphilius sylvarum is a species of insect belonging to the family Pamphilidae.

It is native to Western Europe.
