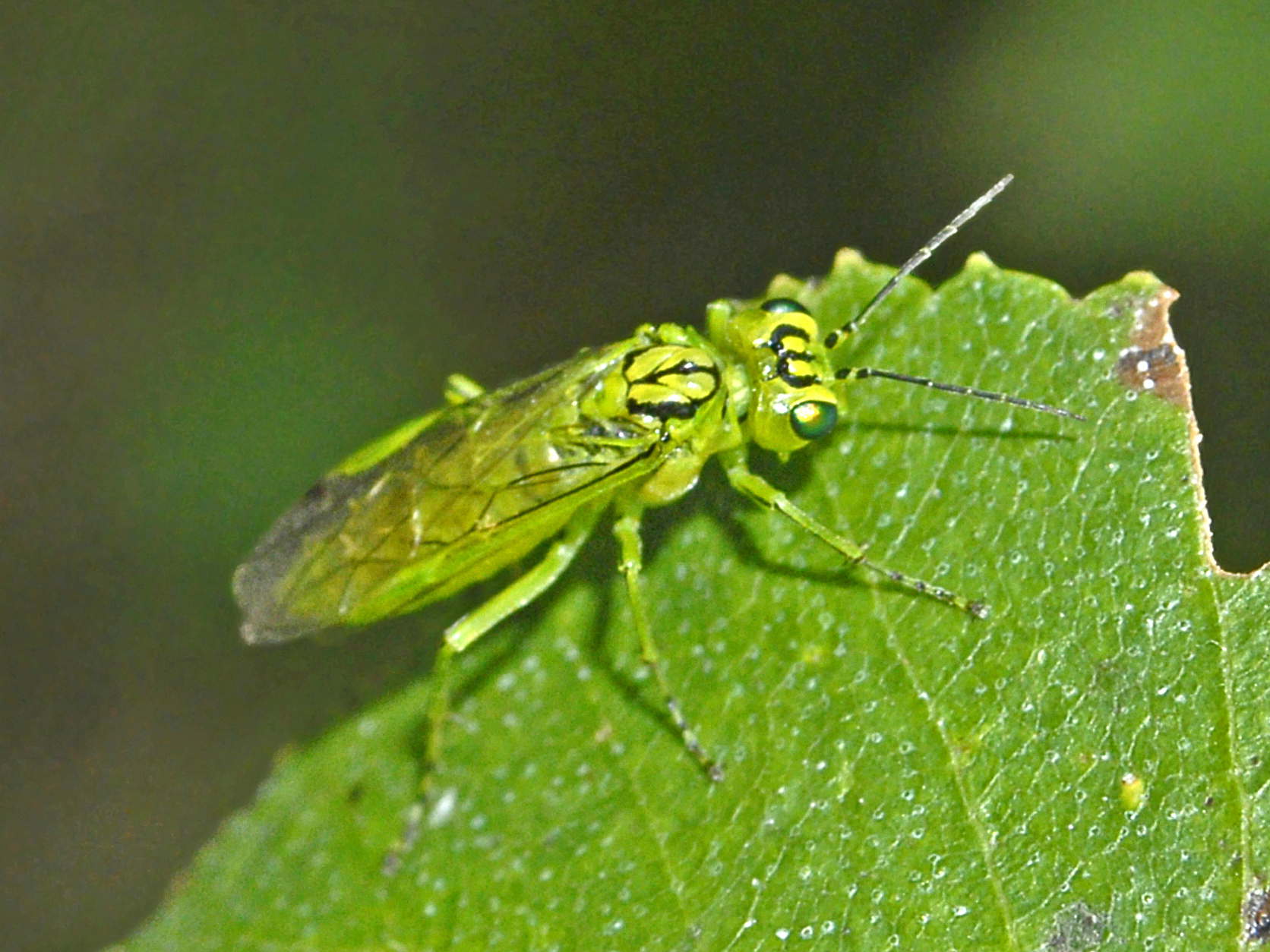

Scientific classification
- Domain: Eukaryota
- Kingdom: Animalia
- Phylum: Arthropoda
- Class: Insecta
- Order: Hymenoptera
- Suborder: Symphyta
- Family: Tenthredinidae
- Genus: Rhogogaster
- Species: R. punctulata

Binomial name
- Rhogogaster punctulata (Klug, 1814)

= Rhogogaster punctulata =

Species of sawfly

Rhogogaster punctulata is a species of sawfly in the family Tenthredinidae.

== Description ==
Rhogogaster punctulata can reach a length of 10–12 millimetres (0.39–0.47 in). Body and head are bright green. This sawfly bears on the head a black drawing in the form of the Greek letter omega and very small black dots along the sides of the abdominal segments. The black markings on the top of the abdomen are absent or quite reduced. Like other sawflies, this species lack the slender "wasp-waist" between the thorax and abdomen. Similar species are Rhogogaster viridis, that shows evident black marks on the upper surface of the abdomen. Adults can mostly be encountered from May through July.

== Biology ==
They mainly feed on small insects, while larvae are polyphagous, feeding on the leaves of a variety of trees and shrubs.

== Distribution and habitat ==
It is widespread in most of Europe. It can be found along hedgerows and woodland rides.
