= Maulden Church Meadow =

Protected area in Bedfordshire, England

Coordinates: 52.031°N 0.458°W

- Site of Special Scientific Interest
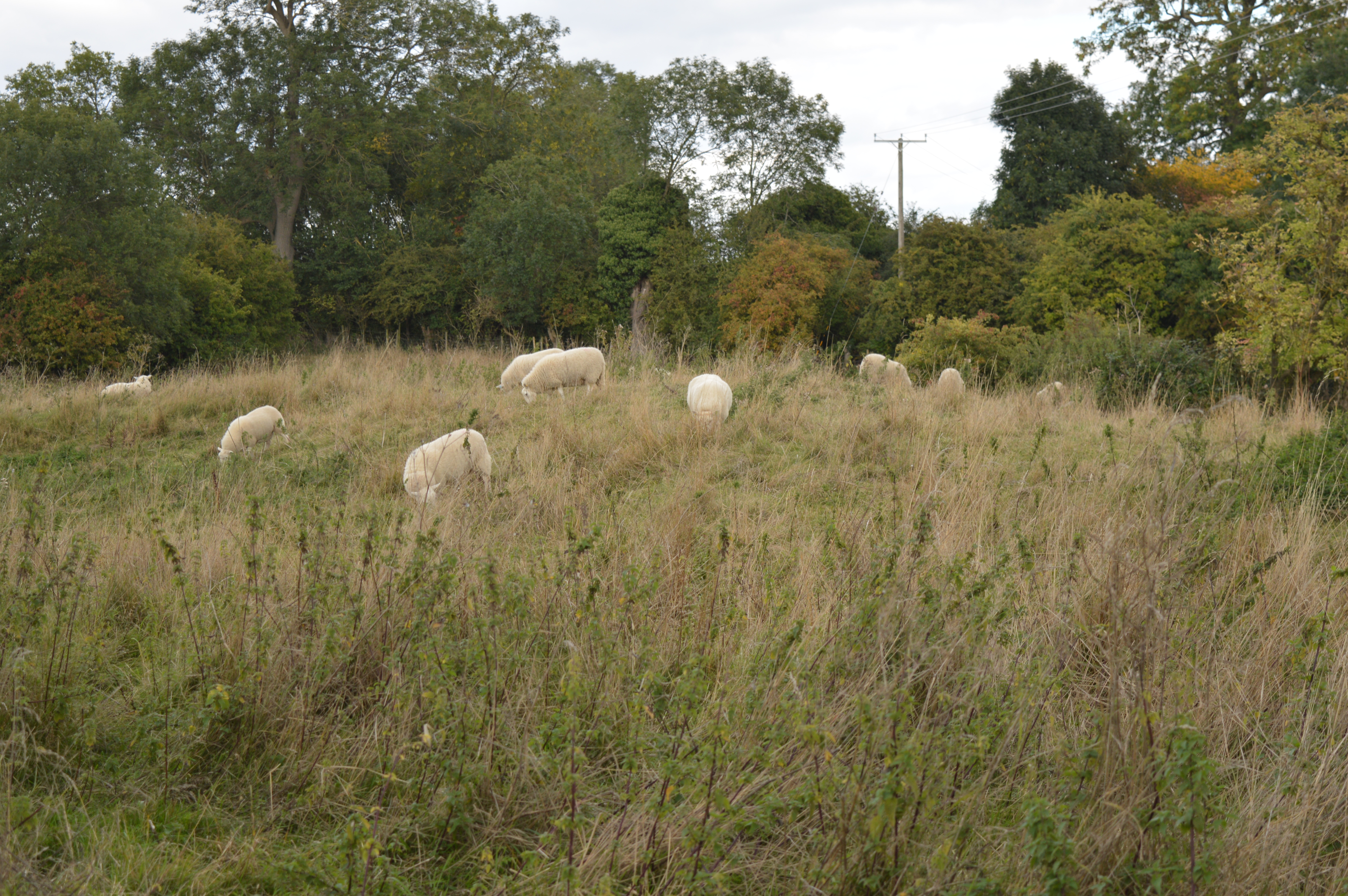
- Location of Maulden Church Meadow.
- Area of search: Bedfordshire
- Grid reference: TL059382
- Interest: Biological
- Area: 4.1 ha (10 acres)
- Notification date: 1987
- Location map: Magic Map

Maulden Church Meadow is a 4.1-hectare (10-acre) biological Site of Special Scientific Interest in Maulden in Bedfordshire. It was notified in 1987 under section 28 of the Wildlife and Countryside Act 1981, and the local planning authority is Central Bedfordshire Council. Most of it (3.3 hectares) is also a Local Nature Reserve, owned and managed by Central Bedfordshire Council.

The site is unimproved pasture on the Lower Greensand Ridge. It is a scarce environment due to modern agricultural methods. Most of it is neutral grassland with many grass and herb species, and there are small areas of acidic grassland. An open pond has aquatic plants, while two ponds which have been filled in have a varied marsh vegetation. Hedges and trees provide shelter for butterflies and dragonflies. There are many anthills produced by yellow meadow ants.

There is access from the end of Church Lane.
