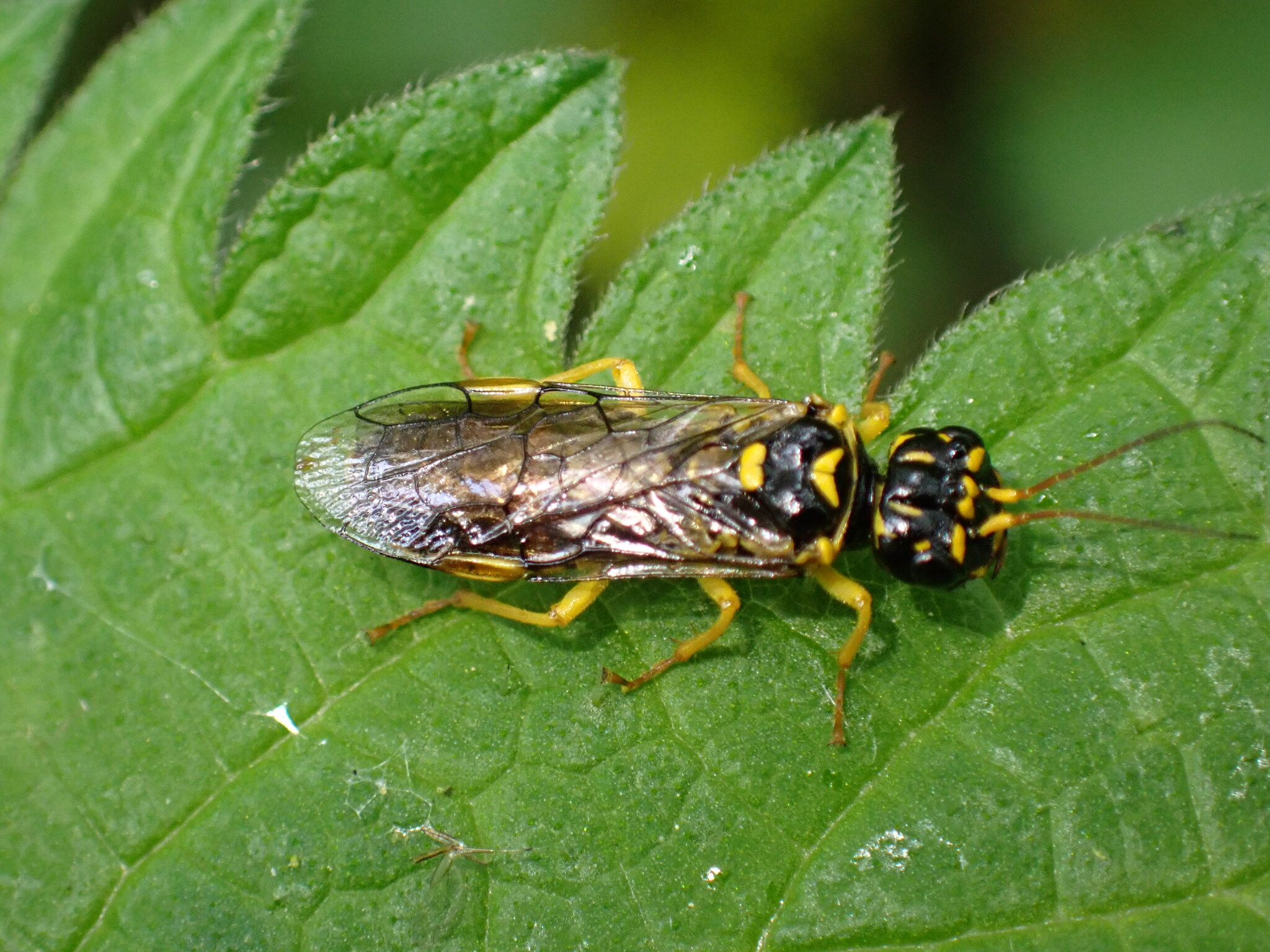

Scientific classification
- Domain: Eukaryota
- Kingdom: Animalia
- Phylum: Arthropoda
- Class: Insecta
- Order: Hymenoptera
- Suborder: Symphyta
- Family: Pamphiliidae
- Genus: Pamphilius
- Species: P. gyllenhali

Binomial name
- Pamphilius gyllenhali (Dahlbom, 1835)

= Pamphilius gyllenhali =

Species of insect

Pamphilius gyllenhali is a species of insect belonging to the family Pamphiliidae.

It is native to Europe.

Synonym:

- Lyda gyllenhali Dahlbom, 1835
