= Neurotoma =

Scientific classification
- Kingdom: Animalia
- Phylum: Arthropoda
- Class: Insecta
- Order: Hymenoptera
- Suborder: Symphyta
- Family: Pamphiliidae
- Genus: Neurotoma; Konow, 1897

Genus of insects

Neurotoma is a genus of insects belonging to the family Pamphiliidae.

The species of this genus are found in Europe, Southeastern Asia and North America.

Species:

- Neurotoma atrata Takeuchi, 1930
- Neurotoma coreana Shinohara, 1980
- Neurotoma cremicolor Shinohara & Xiao, 2004
- Neurotoma edwardi Liston, 1996
- Neurotoma fasciata
- Neurotoma gansuensis Shinohara & Roller, 2007
- Neurotoma inconspicua
- Neurotoma iridescens (André, 1882)
- Neurotoma mandibularis Zaddach, 1866
- Neurotoma saltuum Linnaeus, 1758
- Neurotoma silla
