= Onycholyda =

- Onycholyda amplecta

Scientific classification
- Kingdom: Animalia
- Phylum: Arthropoda
- Clade: Pancrustacea
- Class: Insecta
- Order: Hymenoptera
- Suborder: Symphyta
- Family: Pamphiliidae
- Genus: Onycholyda; Takeuchi, 1938

Genus of wasps

Onycholyda is a genus of wasps in the family Pamphiliidae.

The species of this genus are found in Europe, Asia, and North America.

Species:

- Onycholyda amplecta
- Onycholyda atra
- Onycholyda armata (Maa, 1949)
- Onycholyda decorata Shinohara, 1985
- Onycholyda kumamotonis (Matsumura, 1912) - found in Russia and Japan
- Onycholyda lucida (Rohwer, 1910) - endemic to Japan
- Onycholyda nigroclypeata - host plant is Agrimonia pilosa
- Onycholyda odaesana Shinohara & Byun, 1993 - found in South Korea and China. Host plants include Rubus adenophorus and Rubus parvifolius.
- Onycholyda sertata (Konow, 1903) - found in Northern Europe and Asia. Host plant is Filipendula ulmaria.
- Onycholyda yezoensis Shinohara, 1987 - found in Russia and Japan. Host plant is Rubus parvifolius.
