= Benjamin Thomas Brandreth-Gibbs =

British agriculturalist and horticulturalist

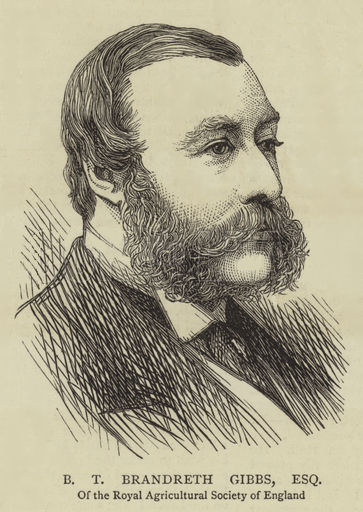
Benjamin Thomas Brandreth-Gibbs in 1876

Sir Benjamin Thomas Brandreth-Gibbs (8 January 1821 – 2 June 1885) was an agriculturalist and horticulturalist who was knighted for his services to both by Queen Victoria in 1878.

== Early life ==
Brandreth-Gibbs was born at Brompton Hall in London and baptized in 1821 in Maulden in Bedfordshire, the youngest son of horticulturalist Thomas Gibbs who founded 'Thomas Gibbs & Co., Seedmerchants' of Half-moon Street, London. Benjamin Thomas Brandreth-Gibbs studied under the Rev Henry Smith Pollard MA and Rev M Marcus MA and was about to enter St John's College, Oxford with intention of proceeding to the Bar but suddenly decided to turn his attention to agricultural pursuits.

== Career ==
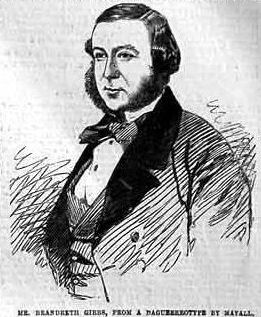
Brandreth-Gibbs in 1855

He was a Superintendent in Class 9 - agricultural machinery, one of the largest sections - at The Great Exhibition of 1851 and was a juror in the same class. He was one of the members of the Executive Committee formed after The Great Exhibition to set up a Memorial to the Exhibition which was to be in the form of "a testimonial of admiration and esteem" to Prince Albert, whose statue was to be its chief feature. The idea caused some embarrassment to Prince Albert and various other schemes were considered until the death of the Prince in 1861 led to his statue being put at the centre of the Albert Memorial.

Brandreth-Gibbs was engaged by the Board of Trade in superintending the selection of agricultural machinery for the British display at the Paris Exhibition of 1855; the display won five gold medals. He was a Superintendent on the Agricultural and Horticultural Committee of the International Exhibition of 1862 when he oversaw the display of agricultural implements in the eastern uncovered annexe at The Crystal Palace.

He was awarded the rank of Commander in the Order of Franz Joseph of Austria and Officer in the Legion of Honour. He was knighted by Queen Victoria at Windsor Castle on 27 November 1878 for services to horticulture. He was the Honorary Director of the Royal Horticultural Society for 32 years and was president in 1884. He was a Member of the Royal Agricultural Society of England and was the Honorary Secretary of the Royal Smithfield Club for 35 years and a vice-president from 1878 to his death in 1885.

== Death ==
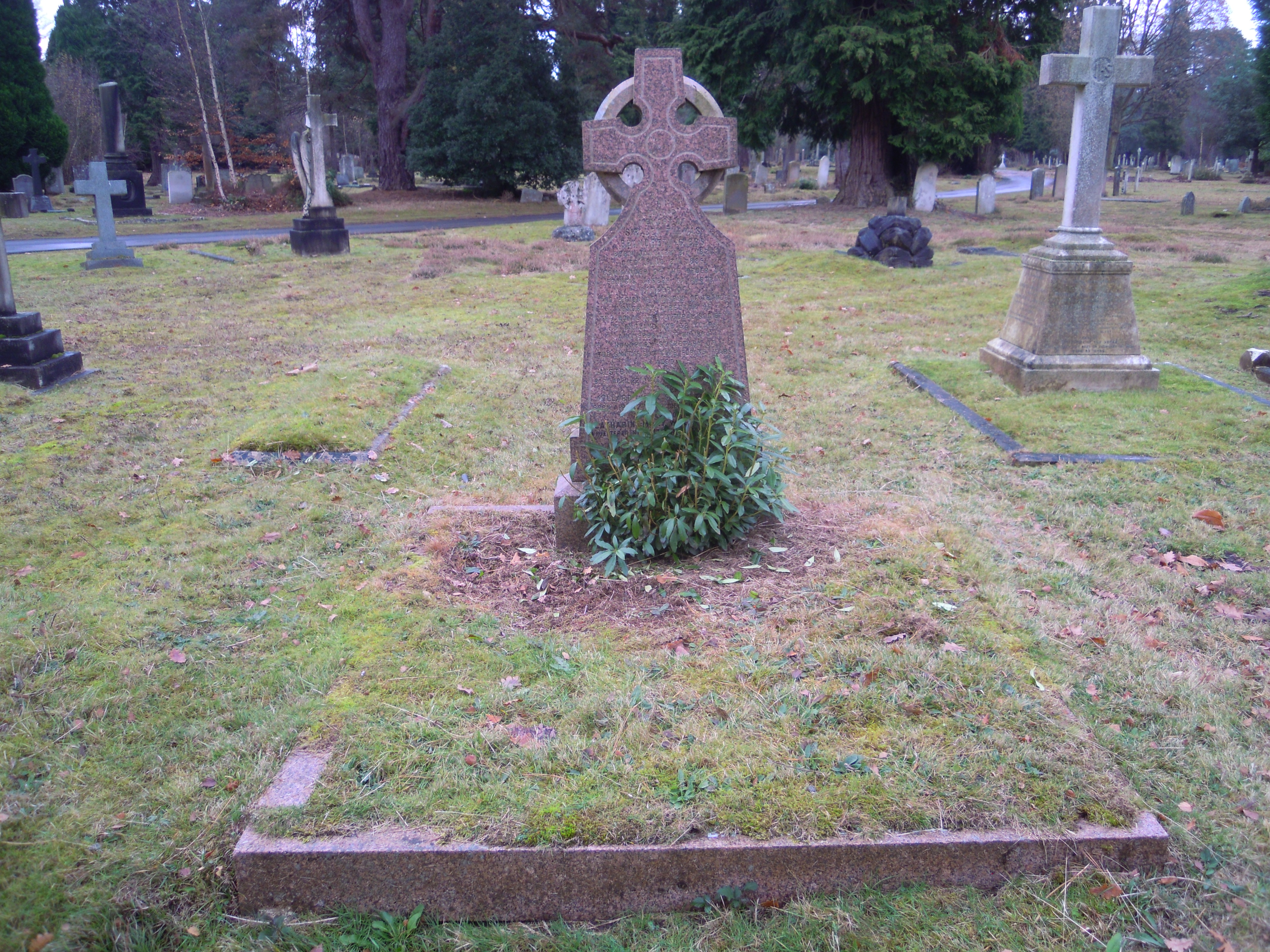
The grave of Sir B. T. Brandreth-Gibbs at Brookwood Cemetery

Benjamin Thomas Brandreth-Gibbs died in 1885 aged 64 years at his home Moseley House in West Kensington Park in London. He is buried in Brookwood Cemetery with his wife Catherine Mary (née Jackson) whom he married in 1870 and who died in 1937 aged 86, his daughter Catherine Alice who died in 1951 aged 78, and his infant sons Alsted (1876-1878) and Millard Brandreth-Gibbs (1880-1881). Another son was Villiers Gibbs.
