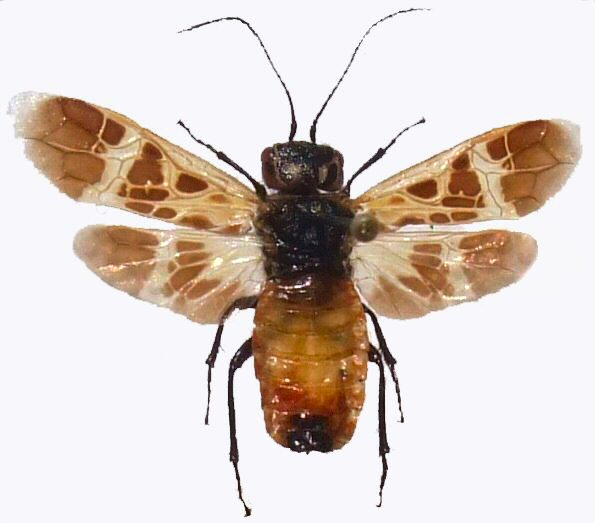
- Caenolyda reticulata

Scientific classification
- Domain: Eukaryota
- Kingdom: Animalia
- Phylum: Arthropoda
- Class: Insecta
- Order: Hymenoptera
- Suborder: Symphyta
- Family: Pamphiliidae
- Subfamily: Cephalciinae
- Genus: Caenolyda; Konow, 1897

= Caenolyda =

Genus of insects

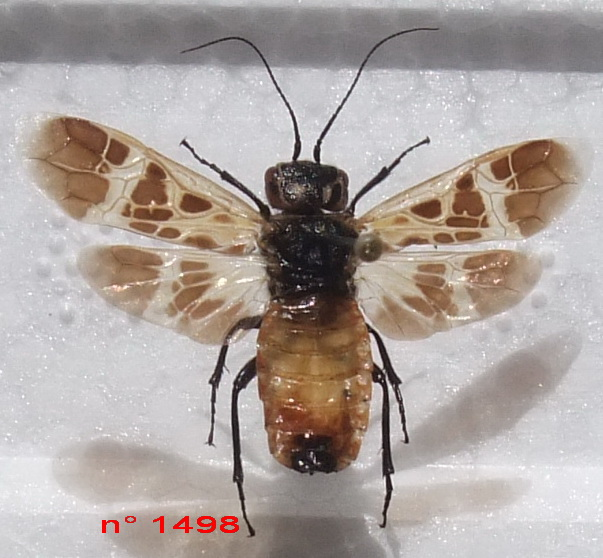

Caenolyda is a genus of insect belonging to the family Pamphiliidae first described by Friedrich Wilhelm Konow in 1897. The two species of this genus are found in Europe.

Species:

- Caenolyda reticulata (Linnaeus, 1758)
- Caenolyda binaghii C. Pesarini & F. Pesarini, 1976
