= Maulden =

Village in Bedfordshire, England

Coordinates: 52.03°N 0.47°W

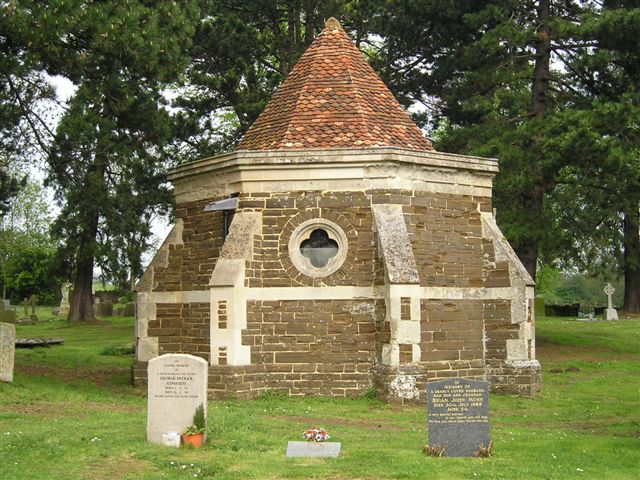
- Ailesbury Mausoleum

- Location within Bedfordshire
- Population: 3,132 (2011 census)
- OS grid reference: TL048377
- Civil parish: Maulden
- Unitary authority: Central Bedfordshire
- Ceremonial county: Bedfordshire
- Region: East
- Country: England
- Sovereign state: United Kingdom
- Post town: Bedford
- Postcode district: MK45
- Dialling code: 01525
- Police: Bedfordshire
- Fire: Bedfordshire
- Ambulance: East of England
- UK Parliament: Mid Bedfordshire

Maulden is a village and civil parish located in the county of Bedfordshire. The village is located 1.5 miles east of Ampthill and about 8 miles (13 km) south of Bedford. It has about 1,250 homes and 3130 residents.

Maulden is referred to in the Domesday Book as Meldone and the meanings ascribed to the various versions of the name include "cross on the hill", "high down" and "place of meeting".

The village forms part of the Ampthill ward in the administrative area of Central Bedfordshire. An active Parish Council meets every five weeks – the clerk is Tracey Bearton.

== Amenities ==
It has primary school, Maulden Lower School for ages 4 to 9- with after school club (), and for Middle School and Upper School provision, children must go to the nearby Ampthill, Alameda Middle and Redborne School. There is also a Local Authority run Pre-School and a private nursery – tudor court (reported as closed). There are two small industrial estates to the south east of the village. These are primarily agricultural, but also contain some light chemical installations and offices. The only youth facility in the village is a recreation ground in the west of the village which is home to the Maulden Magpies Football Club, now recently improved to a Football Foundation ground. The village hall hosts a number of functions and groups who meet there including the Maulden Baby and Toddler Group, jumble sales, exercise classes etc. Each year the Maulden Players perform a pantomime with contributions from many members of the village and surrounding communities. Maulden Baptist Church also runs a number of clubs; including a 'Mums and Tots', youth groups for children (8–18), and more.

== Parish Church ==
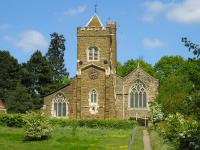
The Parish Church

The parish church of Maulden is St Mary the Virgin. It stands on the Greensand Ridge to one side of the village main road. There are church services every Sunday and throughout the week. The church has an active congregation, with a variety of different events taking place.

There is one rectory for the Parish of St Mary the Virgin. The current recent rector is the Revd Canon Lynda Klimas. Maulden church (and other locations around the village and some Maulden residents) feature in two books, published in 2013 and 2015, entitled Musings from Maulden and More Musings from Maulden.

In 1824 the church consisted of the tower, a nave with a very low roof (it was reported in the Bedford Mercury of October 1858 that during a heavy downpour it was difficult to hear the sermon), a chancel with a slightly higher roof, a north aisle and gallery. This gallery was quite large, and because of the low roof came down to only two feet above the tops of the pews underneath, as well as blocking the light from two of the windows. The pews, some of which faced different ways, provided seating for 248, plus 40 in the gallery. There was no south aisle and no vestry. There was a south entrance with a porch, and a doorway in the north wall, next to the passageway to the Ailesbury mausoleum. The bell tower is in active use and includes a mechanical Westminster "chime" which is a distinctive sound in the village.

In the churchyard stands a 17th-century mausoleum and crypt known as the Ailesbury Mausoleum (pictured). The original mausoleum was built by Thomas, Earl of Elgin, in memory of his second wife Diana, daughter of the Earl of Stamford. The mausoleum and crypt are sometimes open to visitors during the summer months. On 6 August 2008, lead was stolen from the roof of the mausoleum, causing at least £10,000 worth of damage.

== Maulden Baptist Church ==
There is also a church located on Flitwick Road named Maulden Baptist Church. The church was officially formed in 1672, the year John Bunyan obtained a licence to preach. Prior to John Bunyan obtaining this licence, the church was 'underground' and named 'The Maulden Meeting'.

After many years of thriving, the church began to dwindle in size. In 2021, following the COVID-19 pandemic the remaining few members approached the leaders of nearby King's Church Flitwick, asking to come under their oversight. Consequently, Maulden Baptist Church entered a period of dormancy, while King's Church desires to replant it in the near future.

== Census ==
The 1851 Census Index for Maulden can be found in the 1851 Index to Census of Bedfordshire, Volume 4, Book 2 available from the Bedfordshire Family History Society. More recent surveys are available from the National Audit Office.

== History ==
Maulden was a parish in the union of Ampthill, hundred of Redbornestoke, county of Bedford, 1 1/2 miles from Ampthill; containing 1331 inhabitants. The parish comprised nearly 3000 acres (12 km^{2}), of which 260 were woodland and plantations, and of the remainder, two-thirds were arable and one third pasture.

Many of the women were employed in lacemaking and the plaiting of straw. There were some quarries of sandstone; and a pleasure fair was held in the week nearest to St. Bartholomews-day.

The living was a rectory, valued in the King's books at £15.9.7; net income £512; patron, the Marquess of Ailesbury. The tithes were commuted for land and a corn rent, under an act of enclosure in 1796. The church, principally in the latter English style, was, with little intermixture, completely restored in 1837. There were places of worship for baptists and Methodists.

== Surrounding scenery ==
Maulden is surrounded by arable land and rolling pasture hills to the west, allotments and more arable land to the south, and hilly pasture to the east. To the northeast, Maulden Wood stretches over to the ancient road, the A6 and there is a Saxon boundary marker behind the church. Directly north lies Kings Wood and to the Northwest is Houghton House on the Bedfordshire Greensand Ridge Path.

== Culture ==
Maulden Players are an amateur dramatics society who meet weekly at Maulden Village Hall on a Monday night and 2 – 3 times a year put on performances for public audiences. The Players were founded in 1983 under the former guise of St. Mary's Parish Players. Originally only putting on one performance a year with the pantomime in January, the Players soon added more productions to their calendar which usually include a play in May/June for the adult members of the group and a youth production around September/October.

== Notable residents ==
- Sir Benjamin Thomas Brandreth-Gibbs (1821–1885), agriculturalist and horticulturalist, was born in the village.

== Publicity ==
Maulden was referred to in the Local, National and International Media in March 2017 following a formal complaint (under the Clergy Discipline Measure) lodged with the Bishop of St Albans regarding alleged misrepresentations made by the Rector in a Court of Law (the Consistory Court of the Diocese) and to others. No action was taken.

== Neighbourhood Plan ==
In June 2016 Central Bedfordshire Council designated the village as a neighbourhood area for the purposed of making a Neighbourhood Development Plan. The Neighbourhood Plan Steering Group create and assist the Parish Council to create a Neighbourhood Plan for the village of Maulden, within its parish boundary as defined by Central Bedfordshire Council, for the benefit of the parish as a whole.
