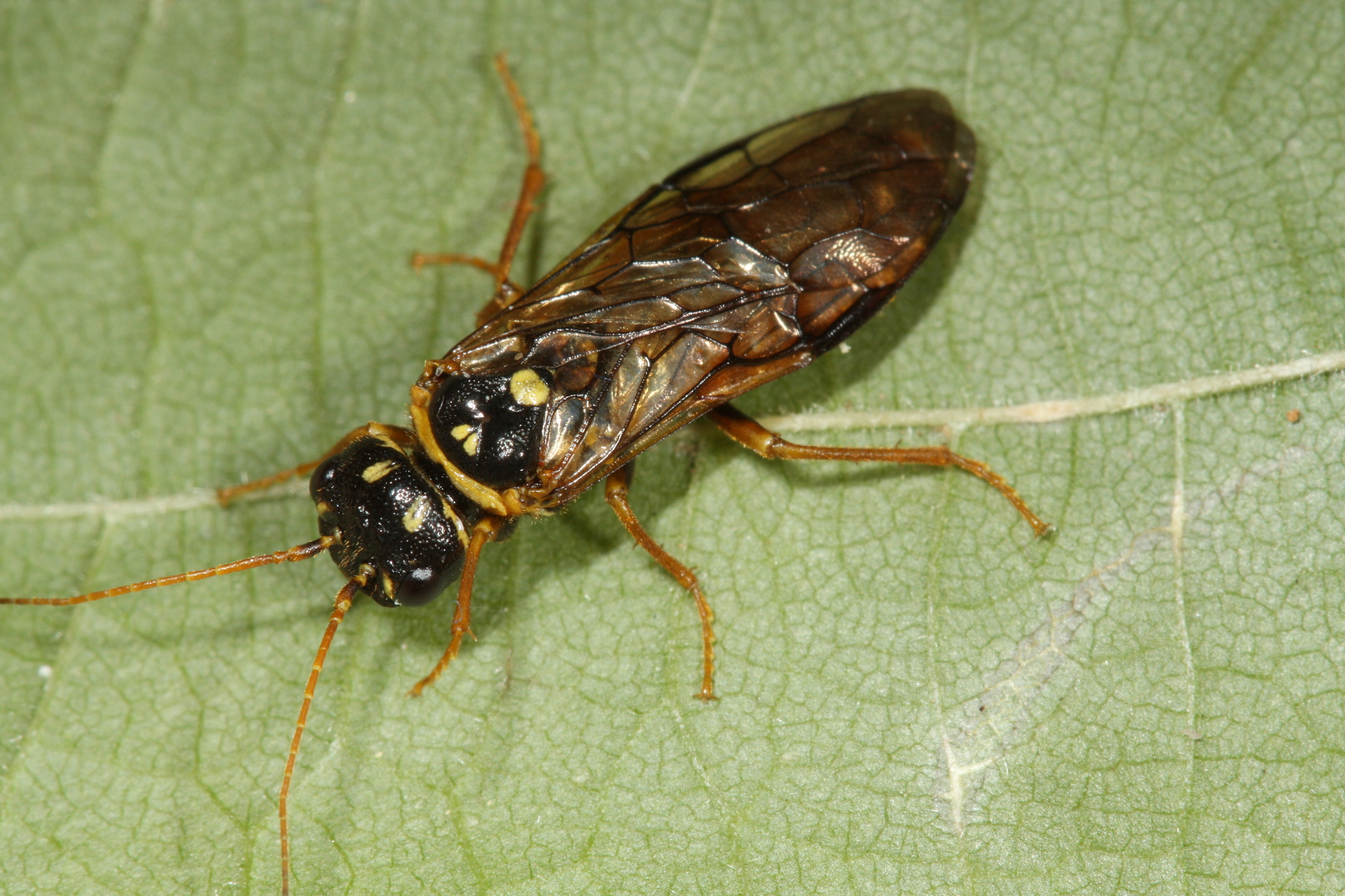
- Cephalcia abietis

Scientific classification
- Kingdom: Animalia
- Phylum: Arthropoda
- Clade: Pancrustacea
- Class: Insecta
- Order: Hymenoptera
- Suborder: Symphyta
- Family: Pamphiliidae
- Subfamily: Cephalciinae
- Genus: Cephalcia; Panzer, 1803

= Cephalcia =

Genus of sawflies

Cephalcia is a genus of insects belonging to the family Pamphiliidae.

The genus was first described by Panzer in 1803.

The species of this genus are found in Europe and North America.

Species:

- Cephalcia abietis
- Cephalcia alashanica
- Cephalcia alpina
- Cephalcia arvensis
- Cephalcia marginata
- Cephalcia pallidula
