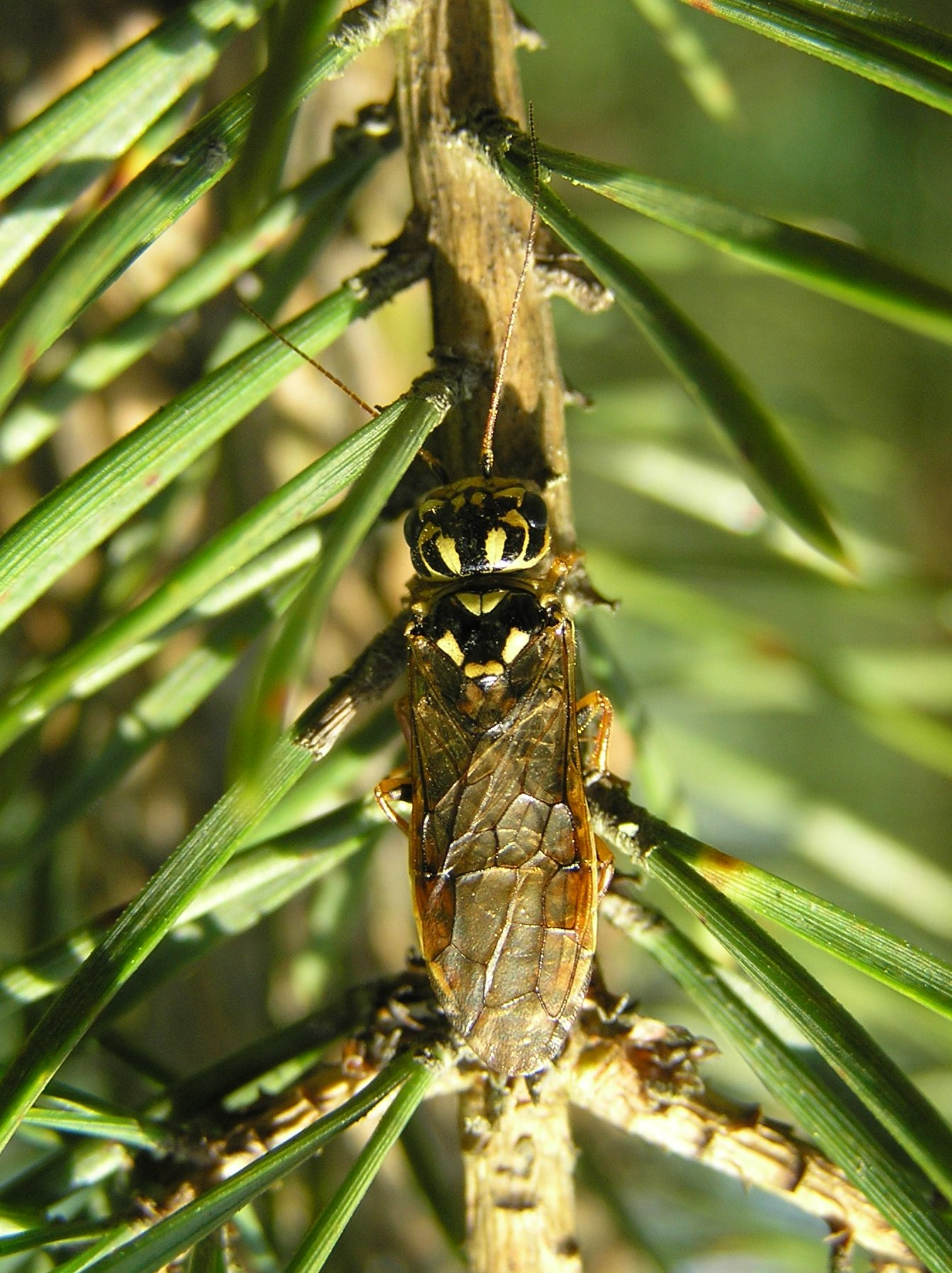
- Acantholyda nemoralis

Scientific classification
- Kingdom: Animalia
- Phylum: Arthropoda
- Clade: Pancrustacea
- Class: Insecta
- Order: Hymenoptera
- Suborder: Symphyta
- Family: Pamphiliidae
- Subfamily: Cephalciinae
- Genus: Acantholyda; Costa, 1894

Type species
- Acantholyda erythrocephala (Linnaeus, 1758)

= Acantholyda =

Genus of sawflies

Acantholyda is a genus of sawflies.

== Subgenera ==
The genus is divided into two subgenera:

- Acantholyda Costa, 1894
- Itycorsia Konow, 1897

== Species ==
- A. aequorea Middlekauff, 1958 – North America (Calif)
- A. aglaia Zhelochovtsev, 1968
  - A. aglaia aglaia Zhelochovtsev, 1968
  - A. aglaia stigma Shinohara, 2001
  - A. aglaia yezoensis Shinohara & Hara, 2000
- A. albomarginata (Cresson, 1880) – North America
- A. alpina Shinohara, 2000 – Japan
- A. angulata (MacGillivray, 1912) – North America
- A. apicalis (Westwood, 1874) – North America
- A. atrata (Cresson, 1880) – North America
- A. atripes (Cresson, 1880) – North America
- A. aurigera Middlekauff, 1958 – North America (Calif)
- A. birmanica Shinohara, 2005 – Asia
- A. balanata (MacGillivray, 1923) – North America
- A. bicolorata (Norton, 1869) – North America
- A. brunnicans (Norton, 1864) – North America
- A. brunniceps (Cresson, 1880) – North America
- A. bucephala (Cresson, 1880) – North America
- A. burkei Middlekauff, 1958 – North America
- A. chicoutimiensis (Huard, 1879) – Canada (East)
- A. circumcincta (Klug, 1808) – North America
- A. crocinca Middlekauff, 1959 – North America
- A. depressa Middlekauff, 1958 – North America (AZ)
- A. dimorpha Maa, 1944
- A. erythrocephala (Linnaeus, 1758) – Europe
- A. flaviventris Shinohara, 1991
- A. flaviceps (Retzius, 1783)
- A. flavomarginata Maa, 1944
- A. floridana Greenbaum, 1975 – North America
- A. hieroglyphica (Christ, 1791) – Northern Eurasia
- A. intermedia Maa, 1949
- A. kojimai Shinohara, 2000 – Japan
- A. kumamotoi Shinohara, 2000 – Japan
- A. laricis (Giraud, 1861) – Northern Eurasia
- A. luteomaculata (Cresson, 1880) – North America
- A. maculiventris (Norton, 1869) – North America
- A. marginiventris (Cresson, 1880) – North America
- A. mexicana Liston, 1996
- A. mizunoi Shinohara, 2001
- A. nemoralis (Thomson, 1871) = A. posticalis
- A. nigripes (Cresson, 1880) – North America
- A. nigrita (Cresson, 1880) – North America
- A. ochrocera (Norton, 1869) – North America
- A. parki Shinohara & Byun, 1996 – Korea, Far Eastern Russia
- A. peiyingaopaoa Xiao, 1963
- A. piceacola Xiao & Zhou, 1986
- A. pini Rohwer, 1911 – North America
- A. pinivora Enslin, 1918 = A. posticalis
- A. pirica Shinohara, 2000 – Japan, Sakhalin
- A. poppigii (Brischke & Zaddach, 1865) – North America
- A. posticalis (Matsumura, 1912) – Northern Eurasia
  - A. posticalis koreana Shinohara, 2000
  - A. posticalis pinivora Enslin, 1918
  - A. posticalis posticalis (Matsumura, 1912)
- A. pumilionis (Giraud, 1861) – Alpine Europe
- †A. ribesalbesensis Peñalver & Arillo, 2002
- A. ruficeps (Harrington, 1893) – North America
- A. runcinata Middlekauff, 1958 – North America
- A. serbica Vasic, 1962
- A. stellata Christ, 1791
- A. taiwana Shinohara, 1991
- A. terminalis (Cresson, 1880) – North America
- A. tesselata (Klug, 1808) – North America
- A. teunisseni Achterberg & Aartsen, 1986
- A. thalictra Middlekauff, 1958 – North America
- A. tsuyukii Shinohara, 2001
- A. verticalis (Cresson, 1880) – North America
- A. xanthiana Wei & Niu, 2008
- A. xiaoi Shinohara, 2000
- A. zappei (Rohwer, 1920) – North America
