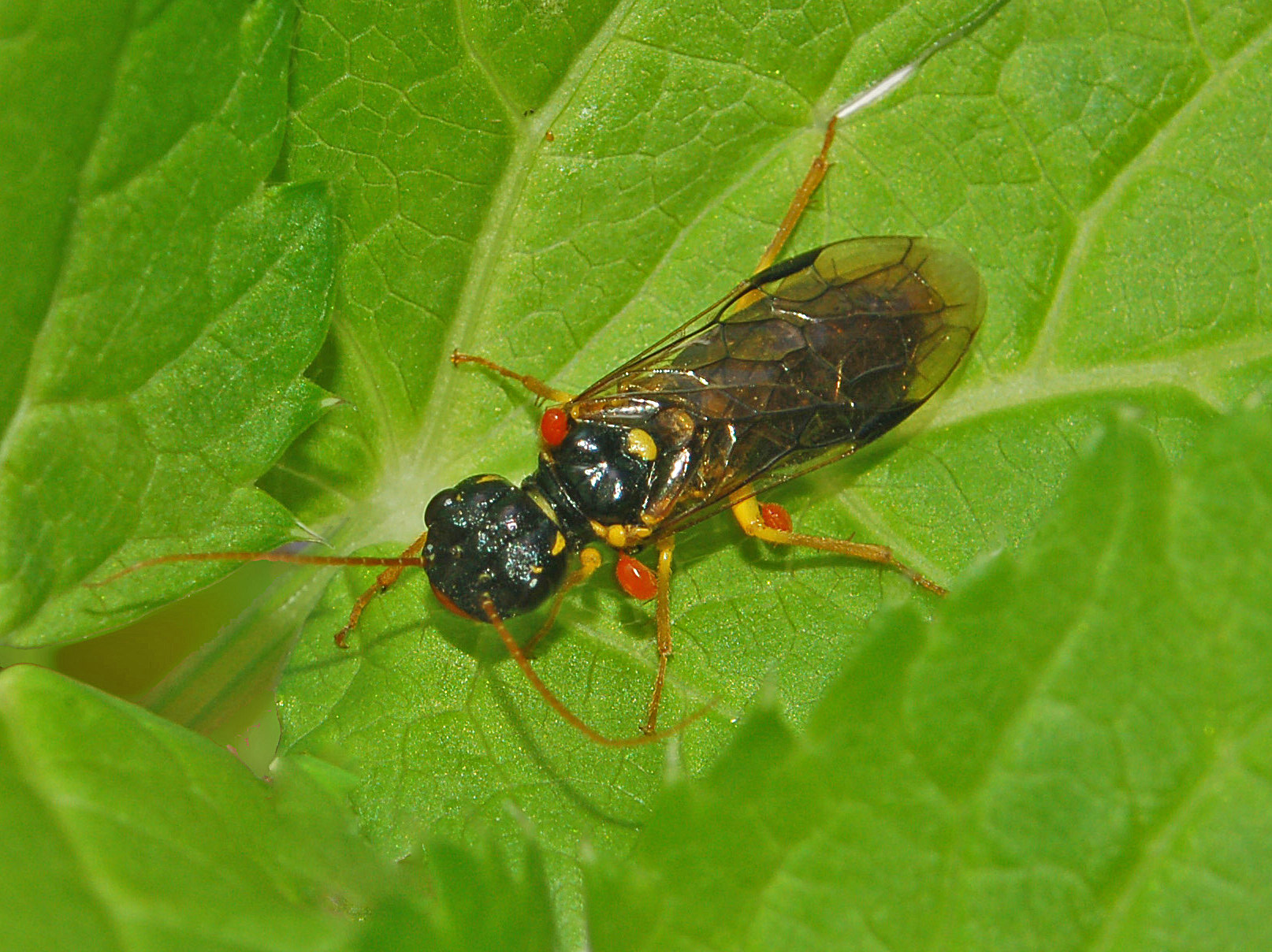
- Pamphilius sp., with larvae of acars

Scientific classification
- Kingdom: Animalia
- Phylum: Arthropoda
- Class: Insecta
- Order: Hymenoptera
- Suborder: Symphyta
- Family: Pamphiliidae
- Genus: Pamphilius; Latreille, 1802

= Pamphilius =

Genus of sawflies

Pamphilius is a genus of leaf-rolling sawflies within the Symphyta belonging to the family Pamphiliidae.

== Description ==
Species of this genus can reach a length of 10–15 millimetres (0.39–0.59 in). Body is usually black with yellowish spots on the head. Legs are yellow and wings are transparent. Tarsal claws have one apical and subapical tooth. Mandibles are large and sickle-shaped. Adults can be found from May until June.

Larvae may be solitary or form a colony, mainly feeding on deciduous trees. Main host plants are Rosaceae and Betulaceae, others are Salicaceae, Aceraceae, Caprifoliaceae, Fagaceae, Cornaceae and Juglandaceae.

== Distribution ==
Species of this genus can be found in North America and in Eurasia.

== Habitat ==
These species prefer hedge rows.

== List of species ==
This genus includes about 115 species.

- Pamphilius albopictus (C. G. Thomson, 1871)
- Pamphilius alnicola Ermolenko, 1973
- Pamphilius alnivorus Shinohara, 2005
- Pamphilius archiducalis Konow, 1897
- Pamphilius armeniacus Shinohara, 1988
- Pamphilius aucupariae Vikberg, 1971
- Pamphilius aurantiacus (Giraud, 1857)
- Pamphilius balteatus (Fallén, 1808)
- Pamphilius basilaris Shinohara, 1982
- Pamphilius benesi Shinohara, 1985
- Pamphilius betulae (Linné, 1758)
- Pamphilius borisi Beneš, 1972
- Pamphilius brevicornis Hellén, 1948
- Pamphilius burquei (Provancher, 1878)
- Pamphilius caucasicus Gussakovskij, 1935
- Pamphilius cilix Konow, 1897
- Pamphilius confusus Shinohara, 2005
- Pamphilius convexus Shinohara, 1988
- Pamphilius coreanus Takeuchi, 1938
- Pamphilius croceus Shinohara, 1986
- Pamphilius daisenus Takeuchi, 1938
- Pamphilius faustus (Klug, 1808)
- Pamphilius flavipectus Shinohara, 2005
- Pamphilius foveatus Shinohara, Dong & Naito, 1998
- Pamphilius fumipennis (Curtis, 1831)
- Pamphilius gracilis Shinohara, 1985
- Pamphilius gyllenhali (Dahlbom, 1835)
- Pamphilius heecheonparki Shinohara, 1998
- Pamphilius hilaris (Eversmann, 1847)
- Pamphilius himalayanus Shinohara & Singh, 1989
- Pamphilius histrio Latreille, 1812
- Pamphilius hortorum (Klug, 1808)
- Pamphilius ignymontiensis Lacourt, 1973
- Pamphilius inanitus (Villers, 1789)
- Pamphilius infuscatus Middlekauff, 1964
- Pamphilius ishikawai Shinohara, 1979
- Pamphilius itoi Shinohara, 1985
- Pamphilius japonicus Shinohara, 1985
- Pamphilius jucundus (Eversmann, 1847)
- Pamphilius kamikochensis Takeuchi, 1930
- Pamphilius kashmirensis Beneš, 1971
- Pamphilius kimi Shinohara, 1997
- Pamphilius komonensis Takeuchi, 1930
- Pamphilius kontuniemii Shinohara, 2003
- Pamphilius kyutekparki Shinohara, 1991
- Pamphilius lanatus Beneš, 1982
- Pamphilius latifrons (Fallén, 1808)
- Pamphilius leleji Shinohara & Taeger, 2007
- Pamphilius leucocephalus Takeuchi, 1938
- Pamphilius lobatus Maa, 1950
- Pamphilius marginatus (Lepeletier, 1823)
- Pamphilius masao Shinohara, 2005
- Pamphilius maximus Shinohara, 1995
- Pamphilius middlekauffi Shinohara & D. R. Smith, 1983
- Pamphilius minor Shinohara & Xiao, 2006
- Pamphilius montanus Shinohara, 1985
- Pamphilius nakagawai Takeuchi, 1930
- Pamphilius naokoae Shinohara, 1999
- Pamphilius nemoralis (Linné, 1758)
- Pamphilius nigrifemoratus Shinohara & Taeger, 1990
- Pamphilius nigropilosus Shinohara, Naito & Huang, 1988
- Pamphilius nitidiceps Shinohara, 1998
- Pamphilius norimbergensis Enslin, 1917
- Pamphilius ochreatus (Say, 1836)
- Pamphilius ochreipes (Cresson, 1880)
- Pamphilius ochrostigma Shinohara, 2001
- Pamphilius ocreatus (Say, 1836)
- Pamphilius opacus Shinohara, 1999
- Pamphilius pacificus (Norton, 1869)
- Pamphilius palachei (Ashmead, 1902)
- Pamphilius palliceps Shinohara & Xiao, 2006
- Pamphilius pallidimacula (Norton, 1869)
- Pamphilius pallidipes (Zetterstedt, 1838)
- Pamphilius pallidus Shinohara, 1988
- Pamphilius pallimacula (Norton, 1869)
- Pamphilius pallipes (Zetterstedt, 1838)
- Pamphilius persicum MacGillivray, 1907
- Pamphilius phyllisae Middlekauff, 1964
- Pamphilius pictifrons Gussakovskij, 1935
- Pamphilius planifrons Beneš, 1976
- Pamphilius politiceps Shinohara & Yuan, 2004
- Pamphilius pugnax Konow, 1897
- Pamphilius pullatus (Cresson, 1880)
- Pamphilius rhoae Shinohara, 1988
- Pamphilius rileyi (Cresson, 1880)
- Pamphilius sapporensis (Matsumura, 1912)
- Pamphilius semicinctus (Norton, 1862)
- Pamphilius shengi Wei, 1999
- Pamphilius silvaticus (Linné, 1758)
- Pamphilius sinensis Shinohara, Dong & Naito, 1998
- Pamphilius smithii W. F. Kirby, 1882
- Pamphilius stramineipes (Hartig, 1837)
- Pamphilius sulphureipes W. F. Kirby, 1882
- Pamphilius sylvanus (Stephens, 1835)
- Pamphilius sylvarum (Stephens, 1835)
- Pamphilius sylvaticus (Linnaeus, 1758)
- Pamphilius takeuchii Beneš, 1972
- Pamphilius thorwaldi Kontuniemi, 1946
- Pamphilius tibetanus Shinohara, Naito & Huang, 1988
- Pamphilius togashii Beneš, 1976 [not 1977]
- Pamphilius tricolor Beneš, 1974
- Pamphilius turkomanus Shinohara, 1991
- Pamphilius uniformis Shinohara & Zhou, 2006
- Pamphilius uniunguis Middlekauff, 1964
- Pamphilius ussuriensis Shinohara, 1988
- Pamphilius vafer (Linné, 1767)
- Pamphilius varius (Lepeletier, 1823)
- Pamphilius venustus (F. Smith, 1874)
- Pamphilius vernalis Middlekauff, 1964
- Pamphilius virescens Malaise, 1931
- Pamphilius viridipes Achterberg & Aartsen, 1986
- Pamphilius viridulus Shinohara, 2001
- Pamphilius volatilis (F. Smith, 1874)
- Pamphilius zhelochovtsevi Beneš, 1974
- Pamphilius zhongi Wei, 2002
- Pamphilius zinovjevi Shinohara, 1988
