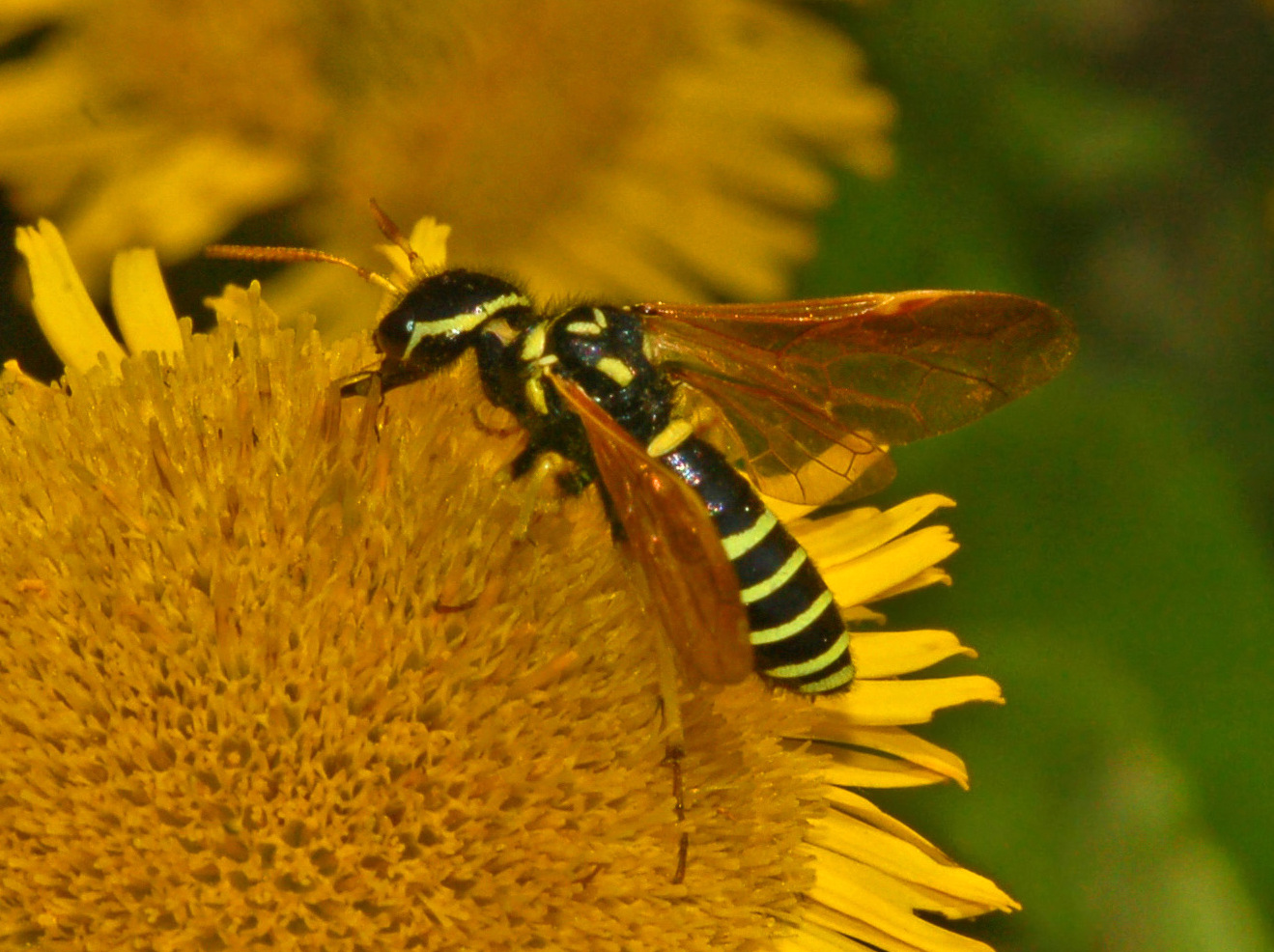
- Megalodontes sp.

Scientific classification
- Domain: Eukaryota
- Kingdom: Animalia
- Phylum: Arthropoda
- Class: Insecta
- Order: Hymenoptera
- Suborder: Symphyta
- Family: Megalodontesidae
- Subfamily: Megalodontesinae
- Genus: Megalodontes; Latreille, 1802

Synonyms
- Tarpa Fabricius, 1804; Megalodus Rafinesque, 1815; Melanopus Konow, 1897; Tristactus Konow, 1897; Rhipidioceros Konow, 1897; Forficulotarpa Pic, 1918; Tristactoides Chevin, 1985

= Megalodontes =

Genus of sawflies

Megalodontes is a genus of sawflies within the Symphyta belonging to the family Megalodontesidae subfamily Megalodontesinae.

== Description ==
Megalodontes species are quite rare sawflies with a shiny black body and narrow pale yellow stripes on the abdomen. The head is large, the antennae are pectinate and the wings are reddish. These species are restricted to the temperate regions of Eurasia.

== Species ==
- Megalodontes bucephalus (Klug, 1824)
- Megalodontes capitalatus Konow, 1904
- Megalodontes cephalotes (Fabricius, 1781)
- Megalodontes dusmeti Enslin, 1914
- Megalodontes eversmanni (Freymuth, 1870)
- Megalodontes fabricii (Leach, 1817)
- Megalodontes flabellicornis (Germar, 1825)
- Megalodontes flavicornis (Klug, 1824)
- Megalodontes gratiosus (Mocsáry, 1881)
- Megalodontes krausi Taeger, 1998
- Megalodontes laticeps Konow, 1897
- Megalodontes medius Konow, 1897
- Megalodontes merceti Konow, 1904
- Megalodontes mocsaryi (Ed. André, 1881)
- Megalodontes mundus Konow, 1904
- Megalodontes panzeri (Leach, 1817)
- Megalodontes phaenicius (Lepeletier, 1823)
- Megalodontes plagiocephalus (Fabricius, 1804)
- Megalodontes scythicus Zhelochovtsev, 1988
- Megalodontes spiraeae (Klug, 1824)
- Megalodontes thor Taeger, 2002
- Megalodontes turcicus (Mocsáry, 1881)
