= Teschendorf =

- Ortsteil of Burg Stargard
- Interactive map of Teschendorf
- Location within Germany Location within Mecklenburg-Vorpommern
- Coordinates: 53°27′11″N 13°20′59″E
- Country: Germany
- State: Mecklenburg-Vorpommern
- District: Mecklenburgische Seenplatte
- Town: Burg Stargard

Area
  - Total: 20.58 km^{2} (7.95 sq mi)
- Elevation: 90 m (300 ft)

Population (2006-12-31)
  - Total: 561
  - Density: 27.3/km^{2} (70.6/sq mi)
- Time zone: UTC+01:00 (CET)
  - Summer (DST): UTC+02:00 (CEST)
- Postal codes: 17094
- Dialling codes: 039603
- Vehicle registration: MST

Teschendorf is a part of Burg Stargard in the district Mecklenburgische Seenplatte, in Mecklenburg-Vorpommern, Germany.
