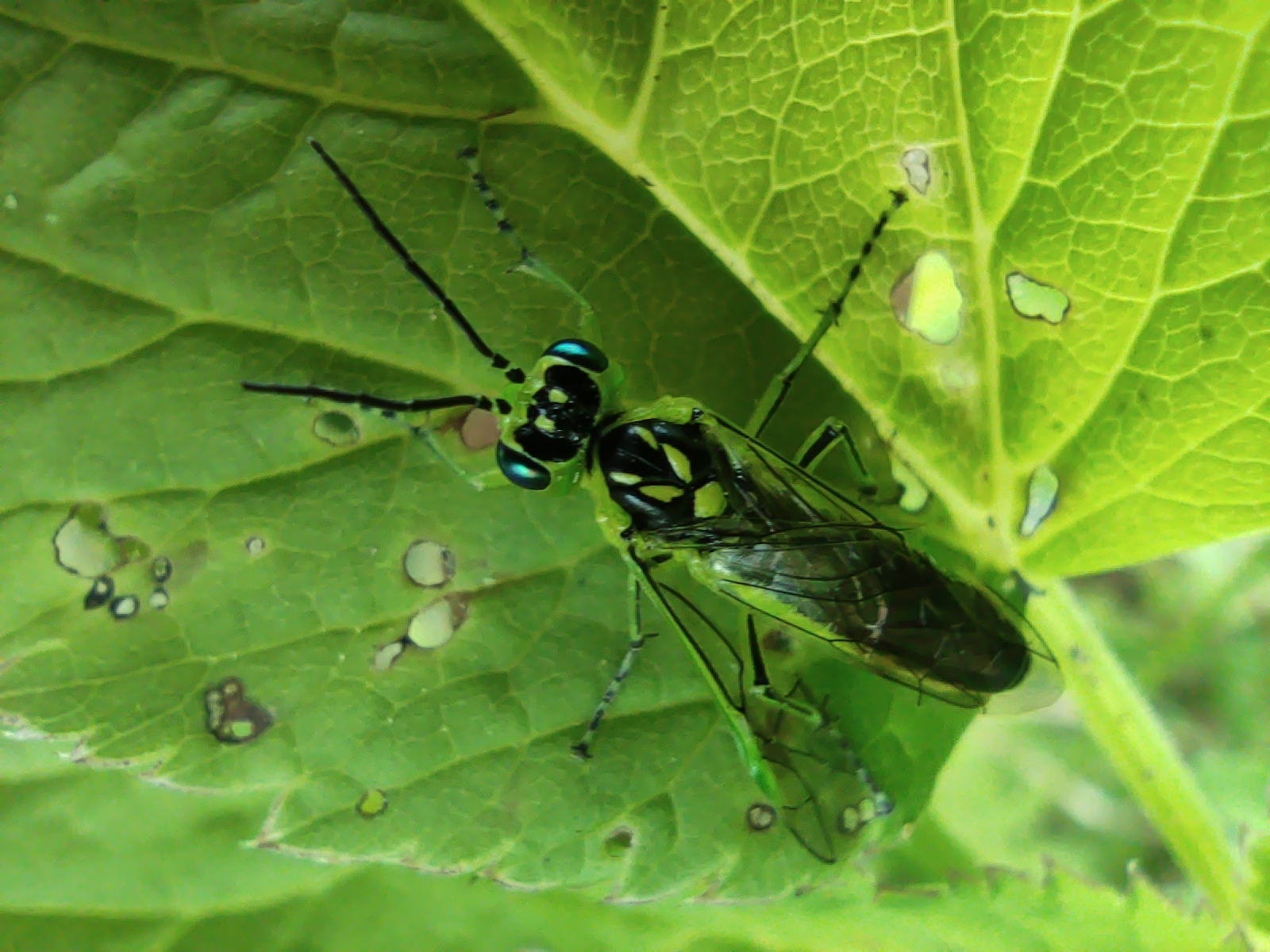
- Rhogogaster viridis photographed in Leningrad, Russia

Scientific classification
- Kingdom: Animalia
- Phylum: Arthropoda
- Class: Insecta
- Order: Hymenoptera
- Suborder: Symphyta
- Family: Tenthredinidae
- Genus: Rhogogaster
- Species: R. viridis

Binomial name
- Rhogogaster viridis (Linnaeus, 1758)

Synonyms
- Rhogogaster dryas (Benson, 1943); Rhogogaster similis Lindqvist, 1959; Tenthredo viridis Linnaeus, 1758

= Rhogogaster viridis =

Species of sawfly

Rhogogaster viridis is a species of common sawfly in the family Tenthredinidae.

== Taxonomy ==
R. viridis was originally described in 1758 by Carl Linnaeus. Subsequent authors mistakenly applied the name to a separate and more common species, R. scalaris, a sister species within the same species group, and instead referred to the present species as R. dryas. True R. viridis is considered to be rare.

== Distribution and habitat ==
This species is a widely-distributed yet rare species known from Bulgaria, Estonia, Finland, Germany, Great Britain, Kazakhstan, Russia, and Sweden. Populations of the viridis group reported from the Nearctic realm previously designated as R. viridis are excluded from this species following revision by Taegar and Viitasaari in 2015. These rather rare sawflies can be found mainly in grassy environment, gardens and parks rich in green leaves.

== Description ==
Rhogogaster viridis can reach a body length of about 9–12 mm (0.35–0.47 in) in the female and 8.5–10 mm (0.33–0.39 in) in the male. Like other species in its genus, this sawfly has a light green head and body. The black markings on the head form two loops in a ∞-shape with two green, rectangular marks in front of the posterior ocelli. The wings are transparent, with the pterostigma uniformly yellowish-green. The legs are green with black bands. This species is separated from the allied R. scalaris in part by the entirely green, rather than black, postocellar carina and from R. polaris in part by the more strongly convex mesoscutellum. As in other sawflies, the female has a saw-like ovipositor.

This species is rather similar to Tenthredo olivacea Klug, 1814 and to other species within its complex, including R. scalaris (Klug, 1817) and R. chlorosoma (Benson, 1943).

== Biology ==
Adults can be found from April to August. They mainly feed on pollen and nectar, but, on sunny summer days, they hunt for insects and suck out their body fluids, feeding especially on Colorado Potato Beetle (Leptinotarsa decemlineata). The larvae are similar to caterpillars, but they have six true legs and several abdominal prolegs. They are phytophagous and feed on the leaves of Populus tremula.
