= Friedrich Wilhelm Konow =

German entomologist (1842–1908)

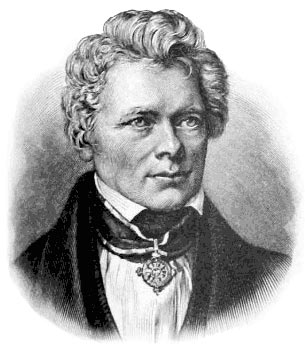
Friedrich Wilhelm Konow

Friedrich Wilhelm Konow (11 July 1842, in Mechow – 18 March 1908, in Teschendorf) was a German priest and amateur entomologist who specialised in Hymenoptera, especially Tenthredinidae.

== Life and works ==
Konow was born in Mechow where he attended the school where his father worked. He then studied at Fürstenhagen and from 1857 at the Realschule followed by Gymnasium Carolinum in Neustrelitz. He studied theology from 1865 at Rostock and Erlangen and then worked as a private tutor near Oyle near Nienburg. He then became a preacher in Damshagen, followed by service in Gülz and Tessin. He then became a teacher at a girls' school in Schwerin. He was ordained in 1878 and became a pastor at Fürstenberg in Mecklenburg-Strehlitz. In 1892 he was at Teschendorf. He studied entomology in his spare time and collected specimens from all groups of insects other than Lepidoptera. Later he specialized on the Hymenoptera. He wrote in various entomological periodicals. He wrote Familie Tenthredinidae in Wytsman's, Genera Insectorum ( Fascicle 29) 176 pp. 1905) and many short papers describing new species of worldwide Tenthredinidae. His collection is shared between the German Entomological Institute, Biozentrum Grindel und Zoologisches Museum, Hamburg and Museum für Naturkunde in Berlin.

=== Publications ===
- Konow, 1899. Einige neue Chalastogastra-Gattungen und Arten. Entomologische Nachrichten 25:73–79

=== See also ===
- Category:Taxa named by Friedrich Wilhelm Konow

== Other sources ==
- Musgrave, A. 1932 Bibliography of Australian Entomology 1775–1930. Sydney
- Bibliography
