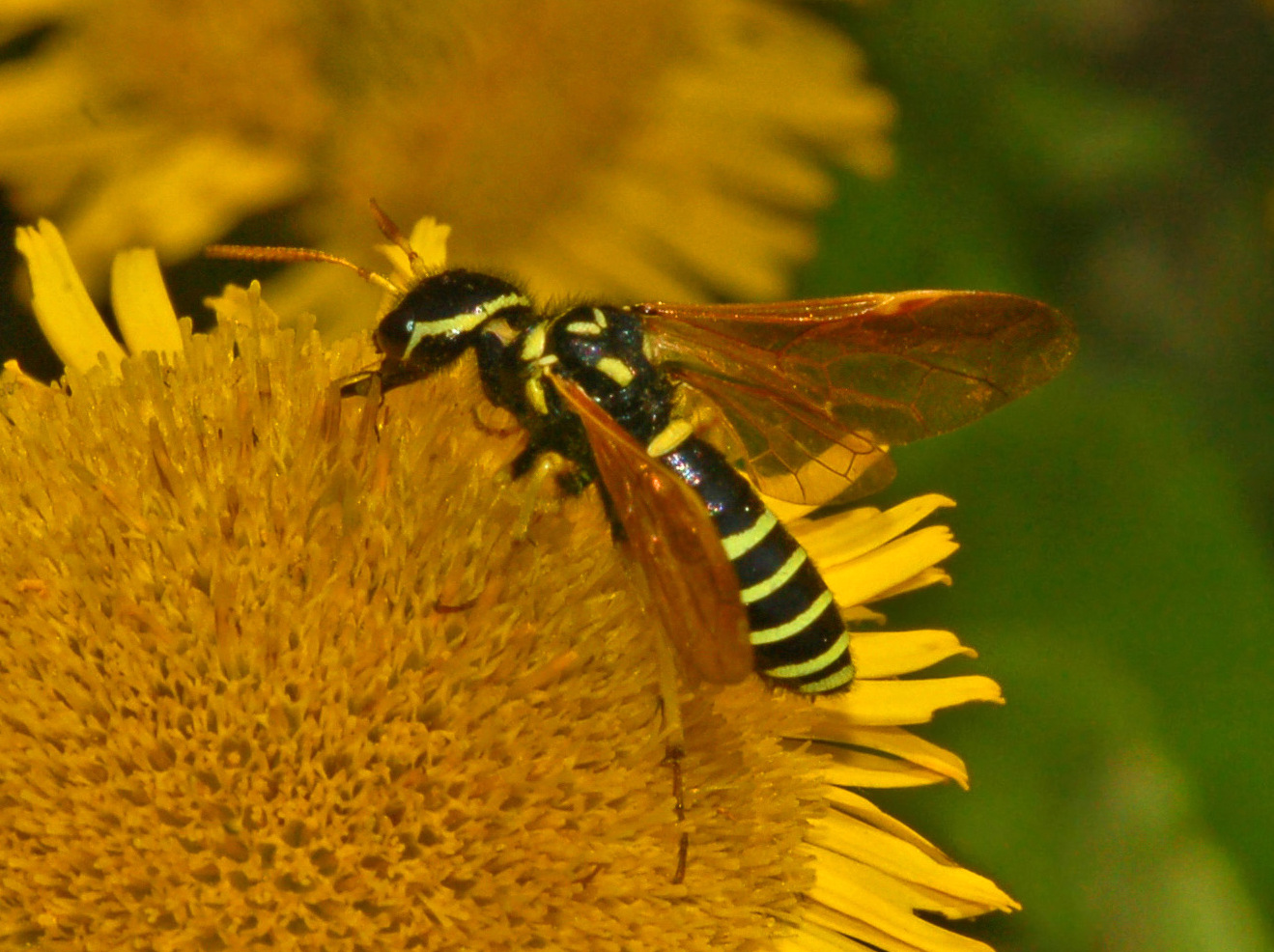
- Megalodontes sp.

Scientific classification
- Domain: Eukaryota
- Kingdom: Animalia
- Phylum: Arthropoda
- Class: Insecta
- Order: Hymenoptera
- Suborder: Symphyta
- Superfamily: Pamphilioidea
- Family: Megalodontesidae; Konow, 1897

Genera
- See text

Synonyms
- Praesiricidae Rasnitsyn, 1968

= Megalodontesidae =

Family of sawflies

The Megalodontesidae (until recently spelled Megalodontidae, a name already in use for a family of fossil molluscs) are a small family of sawflies, containing a single living genus, Megalodontes, with some 40 species restricted to the temperate regions of Eurasia. Larvae of Megalodontesidae feed on herbaceous plants. They are distinguished from the closely related Pamphiliidae by their serrate or pectinate antennae.

In 2016, a phylogenetic analysis of the superfamily Pamphilioidea found that the extinct family Praesiricidae was paraphyletic with respect to Megalodontesidae, so Praesiricidae was proposed as a synonym of Megalodontesidae.

== Genera ==
As of 2016, the following genera belong to the family Megalodontesidae, divided into four subfamilies:

- Subfamily Megalodontesinae Konow, 1897 (synonym: Rudisiriciinae Gao, Rasnitsyn, Ren & Shih, 2010)
  - †Aulidontes Rasnitsyn, 1983
  - †Jibaissodes Ren, 1995
  - Megalodontes Latreille, 1802
  - †Rudisiricius Gao, Rasnitsyn, Ren & Shih, 2010
- Subfamily Archoxyelydinae Wang, Rasnitsyn & Ren, 2013
  - †Archoxyelyda Wang, Rasnitsyn & Ren, 2013
  - †Xyelydontes Rasnitsyn, 1983
- Subfamily Decorisiricinae Wang, Rasnitsyn, Shih, Sharkey & Ren, 2015
  - †Brevisiricius Wang, Rasnitsyn, Shih, Sharkey & Ren, 2015
  - †Decorisiricius Wang, Rasnitsyn, Shih, Sharkey & Ren, 2015
  - †Limbisiricius Wang, Rasnitsyn, Shih, Sharkey & Ren, 2015
- Subfamily Praesiricinae Rasnitsyn, 1968
  - †Praesirex Rasnitsyn, 1968
  - †Turgidontes Rasnitsyn, 1990
- Incertae sedis
  - †Hoplitolyda Gao, Shih, Rasnitsyn & Ren, 2013
  - †Sinosepulca Ren, 1995
