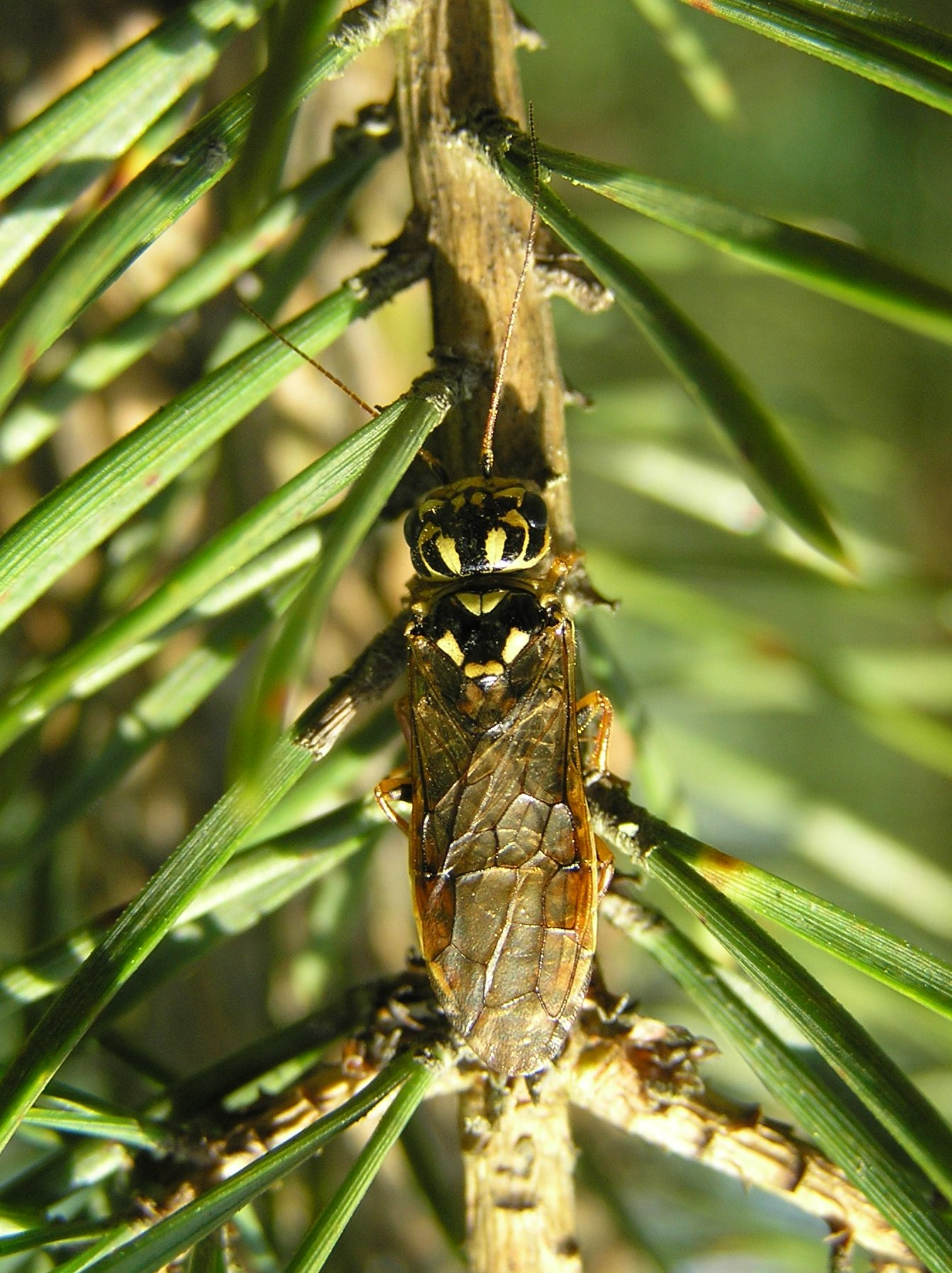
- Acantholyda nemoralis

Scientific classification
- Kingdom: Animalia
- Phylum: Arthropoda
- Class: Insecta
- Order: Hymenoptera
- Suborder: Symphyta
- Superfamily: Pamphilioidea
- Family: Pamphiliidae; Cameron, 1890

Subfamilies and genera
- See text

Diversity
- ~200 species in 8 genera

= Pamphiliidae =

Family of sawflies

Pamphiliidae (sometimes incorrectly spelled Pamphilidae) is a small family within Symphyta, containing some 200 species from the temperate regions of North America and Eurasia. The larvae feed on plants (often conifers), using silk to build webs or tents, or to roll leaves into tubes in which they feed, thus earning them the common names leaf-rolling sawflies or web-spinning sawflies. Some species are gregarious and the larvae live in large groups. Fossils of Pamphiliidae have been dated to the Jurassic period.

They are distinguished from the closely related Megalodontesidae by their simple, filiform antennae.

== Taxonomy ==
The family is currently divided into three subfamilies based on phylogenetic analysis of both extant and extinct species.

- Cephalciinae Benson, 1945
  - Acantholyda Costa, 1894
  - Caenolyda Konow, 1897
  - Cephalcia Panzer, 1805
  - Chinolyda Beneš, 1968
- Juralydinae
  - †Atocus Scudder, 1892
  - †Juralyda Rasnitsyn, 1977
  - Neurotoma Konow, 1897
  - †Scabolyda Wang et al, 2014
  - †Tapholyda Rasnitsyn, 1983
- Pamphiliinae Cameron, 1890
  - Chrysolyda Shinohara, 2002
  - Kelidoptera Konow, 1897
  - Onycholyda Takeuchi, 1938
  - Pamphilius Latreille, 1802
  - Pseudocephaleia Zirngiebl, 1937
- Incertae sedis
  - †Ulteramus Archibald & Rasnitsyn, 2015
