= List of Pissodes species =

This is a list of 140 species in the genus Pissodes, also known as conifer weevils.

== Pissodes species ==
- Pissodes abietis Ratzeburg, 1837^{c}
- Pissodes affinis Randall, 1838^{i c b}
- Pissodes alascensis Hopkins, 1911^{c}
- Pissodes albosignatus Dejean, 1821^{c}
- Pissodes annulatus Dejean, 1821^{c}
- Pissodes apiatus Dejean, 1821^{c}
- Pissodes approximatus Hopkins, 1911^{i c b} (northern pine weevil)
- Pissodes araliae Montrouzier, 1860^{c}
- Pissodes argus Sturm, 1826^{c}
- Pissodes armatus Sturm, 1826^{c}
- Pissodes barberi Hopkins, 1911^{i c}
- Pissodes bellicosus Sturm, 1826^{c}
- Pissodes bimaculatus Sturm, 1826^{c}
- Pissodes brasiliensis Cristofori & Jan, 1832^{c}
- Pissodes brunneus Dalla Torre & Schenkling, 1932^{c}
- Pissodes bufo Germar, 1817^{c}
- Pissodes burkei Hopkins, 1911^{i c}
- Pissodes californicus Hopkins, 1911^{i c}
- Pissodes canadensis Hopkins, 1911^{c}
- Pissodes castaneus (DeGeer, C., 1775)^{c g}
- Pissodes caucasicus Roubal, 1923^{c}
- Pissodes cembrae Motschulsky, V. de, 1860^{c}
- Pissodes championi O'Brien, 1989^{c}
- Pissodes cheni Lu, Zhang & Langor, 2007^{c}
- Pissodes cibriani O'Brien, 1989^{c}
- Pissodes circularis Sturm, 1826^{c}
- Pissodes collaris Sturm, 1826^{c}
- Pissodes coloradensis Hopkins, 1911^{i c}
- Pissodes conspersus Dejean, 1821^{c}
- Pissodes coronatus Dejean, 1821^{c}
- Pissodes costatus Mannerheim, 1852^{i c}
- Pissodes creutzeri Germar, E.F., 1824^{c}
- Pissodes cribrosus Sturm, 1826^{c}
- Pissodes curriei Hopkins, 1911^{c}
- Pissodes cylindricus Sturm, 1826^{c}
- Pissodes dealbatus Sturm, 1826^{c}
- Pissodes deodarae Hopkins, 1911^{c}
- Pissodes dubius Randall, 1838^{c}
- Pissodes echinatus Sturm, 1826^{c}
- Pissodes effossus Heyden, C. von, 1858^{c g}
- Pissodes engelmanni Hopkins, 1911^{c}
- Pissodes erythrocephalus Sturm, 1826^{c}
- Pissodes erythrorhynchus Germar, 1824^{c}
- Pissodes fabricii Stephens, 1829^{c}
- Pissodes fasciatus LeConte, 1876^{i c}
- Pissodes femoratus Sturm, 1826^{c}
- Pissodes ferrugineus Rey, C., 1895^{c}
- Pissodes fiskei Hopkins, 1911^{i c}
- Pissodes flammiger Germar, 1824^{c}
- Pissodes fraseri Hopkins, 1911^{c}
- Pissodes galloisi Kôno, 1928^{c}
- Pissodes guatemaltecus Voss, 1955^{c}
- Pissodes gyllenhali Gyllenhal, L. in Schönherr, C.J., 1836^{c}
- Pissodes gyllenhalii Gyllenhal, 1835^{c}
- Pissodes harcyniae (Herbst, J.F.W., 1795)^{c g}
- Pissodes henningseni Voss, 1972^{c}
- Pissodes hercyniae Dejean, 1821^{c}
- Pissodes hispidus Sturm, 1826^{c}
- Pissodes insignatus Boheman, 1843^{c}
- Pissodes interruptus Pic, 1937^{c}
- Pissodes interstitiosus Dalla Torre & Schenkling, 1932^{c}
- Pissodes irroratus Reitter, E., 1899^{c}
- Pissodes japonicus Niishima, 1915^{c}
- Pissodes juniperi Dejean, 1821^{c}
- Pissodes laevigatus Sturm, 1826^{c}
- Pissodes laricinus Motschulsky, V. de, 1860^{c}
- Pissodes macellus Germar, 1824^{c}
- Pissodes marginalis Dejean, 1821^{c}
- Pissodes marmoreus Dejean, 1821^{c}
- Pissodes mexicanus O'Brien, 1989^{c}
- Pissodes multiguttatus Dejean, 1821^{c}
- Pissodes multisignatus Dejean, 1821^{c}
- Pissodes murrayanae Hopkins, 1911^{i c}
- Pissodes myops Cristofori & Jan, 1832^{c}
- Pissodes nebulosus Sturm, 1826^{c}
- Pissodes nemorensis Germar, 1824^{i c b} (eastern pine weevil)
- Pissodes nigrae Hopkins, 1911^{c}
- Pissodes nitidus Roelofs, W., 1874^{c}
- Pissodes notatus Sturm, 1826^{c}
- Pissodes obscurus Dejean, 1821^{c}
- Pissodes obsoletus Sturm, 1826^{c}
- Pissodes ocellatus Dejean, 1821^{c}
- Pissodes ochraceus Van Dyke, 1927^{i c}
- Pissodes oculatus Dejean, 1821^{c}
- Pissodes onychinus Germar, 1824^{c}
- Pissodes ornatus Sturm, 1826^{c}
- Pissodes palmes Dalla Torre & Schenkling, 1932^{c}
- Pissodes piceae Schoenherr, 1825^{c}
- Pissodes picturatus Germar, 1824^{c}
- Pissodes pilatsquamosus Lu, Zhang & Langor, 2007^{c}
- Pissodes pini (Linnaeus, C., 1758)^{c g}
- Pissodes piniphilus Billberg, 1820^{c g}
- Pissodes piperi Hopkins, 1911^{c}
- Pissodes planatus Foerster, B., 1891^{c g}
- Pissodes polymitus Germar, 1824^{c}
- Pissodes prodigialis Germar, 1824^{c}
- Pissodes ptinicollis Sturm, 1826^{c}
- Pissodes pulverosus Dejean, 1821^{c}
- Pissodes pulverulentus Sturm, 1826^{c}
- Pissodes punctatus Langor & Zhang in Langor, Situ & Zhang, 1999^{c}
- Pissodes puncticollis Hopkins, 1911^{i c}
- Pissodes punctum Sturm, 1826^{c}
- Pissodes pupillatus Dejean, 1821^{c}
- Pissodes pygmaeus Curtis, 1840^{c}
- Pissodes quadrinotatus Sturm, J., 1826^{c}
- Pissodes radiatae Hopkins, 1911^{i c}
- Pissodes robustus Van Dyke, 1927^{i c}
- Pissodes rotundatus LeConte, 1876^{i c b} (small spruce weevil)
- Pissodes rotundicollis Desbrochers, J., 1870^{c}
- Pissodes rufitarsis Dejean, 1821^{c}
- Pissodes scabricollis Miller, L., 1859^{c}
- Pissodes schwarzi Hopkins, 1911^{i c b} (Yosemite bark weevil)
- Pissodes scutellaris Sturm, 1826^{c}
- Pissodes sericeus Sturm, 1826^{c}
- Pissodes setosus Sturm, 1826^{c}
- Pissodes silvaticus Voss, 1956^{c}
- Pissodes similis Hopkins, 1911^{i c b}
- Pissodes sitchensis Hopkins, 1911^{c}
- Pissodes spinosus Dejean, 1821^{c}
- Pissodes squamosus LeConte J E, 1824^{c}
- Pissodes striatulus (Fabricius, 1775)^{i c g b} (balsam bark weevil)
- Pissodes strobi (Peck, 1817)^{i c b} (white pine weevil)
- Pissodes strobili Redtenbacher, L., 1849^{c}
- Pissodes strobyli Redtenbacher, 1849^{c}
- Pissodes terminalis Hopping, 1920^{i c}
- Pissodes terribilis Sturm, 1826^{c}
- Pissodes tesselatus Dejean, 1821^{c}
- Pissodes tribulus Sturm, 1826^{c}
- Pissodes tuberculatus Dejean, 1821^{c}
- Pissodes umbrosus Sturm, 1826^{c}
- Pissodes undabundus Sturm, 1826^{c}
- Pissodes undatus Dejean, 1821^{c}
- Pissodes utahensis Hopkins, 1911^{c}
- Pissodes validirostris Gyllenhal, 1835^{c}
- Pissodes variabilis Sturm, 1826^{c}
- Pissodes verrucosus Sturm, 1826^{c}
- Pissodes webbi Hopkins, 1911^{i c}
- Pissodes yosemite Hopkins, 1911^{c}
- Pissodes yunnanensis Langor & Zhang in Langor, Situ & Zhang, 1999^{c}
- Pissodes zitacuarense Sleeper, 1969^{c}

Data sources: i = ITIS, c = Catalogue of Life, g = GBIF, b = Bugguide.net
