= Red-headed pine sawfly =

Red-headed pine sawfly or redheaded pine sawfly is a common name for several insects and may refer to:

- Acantholyda erythrocephala, native to Europe and introduced to North America
- Neodiprion lecontei, native to North America
- Neodiprion sertifer, native to Europe and introduced to North America
