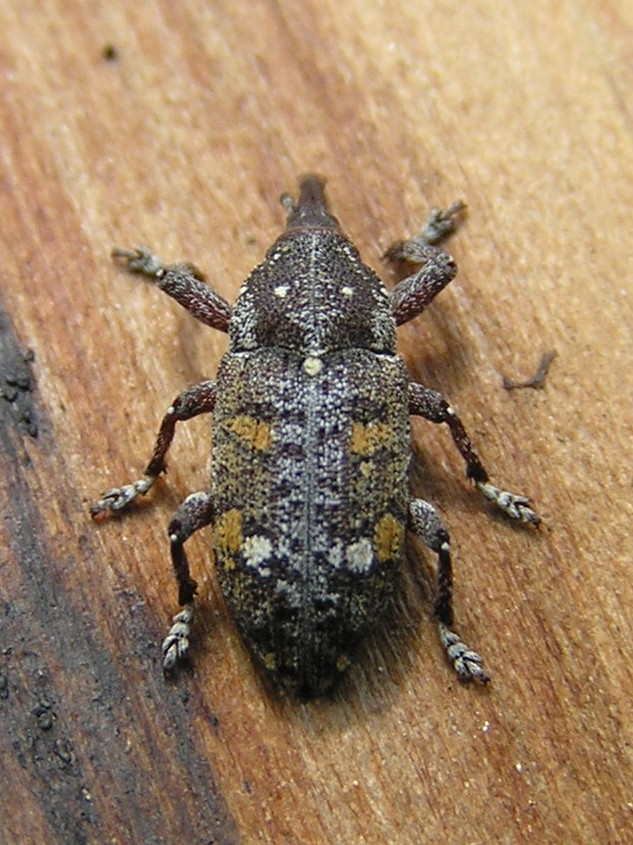
- Pissodes notatus

Scientific classification
- Domain: Eukaryota
- Kingdom: Animalia
- Phylum: Arthropoda
- Class: Insecta
- Order: Coleoptera
- Suborder: Polyphaga
- Infraorder: Cucujiformia
- Family: Curculionidae
- Subfamily: Molytinae
- Tribe: Pissodini; Gistel, 1856

Subtribes
- Cotasteromimina; Orthorhinina; Pissodina

= Pissodini =

Tribe of beetles

Pissodini is a tribe of weevils described by Johannes von Nepomuk Franz Xaver Gistel in 1856.

Pissodini includes the genus Pissodes.
