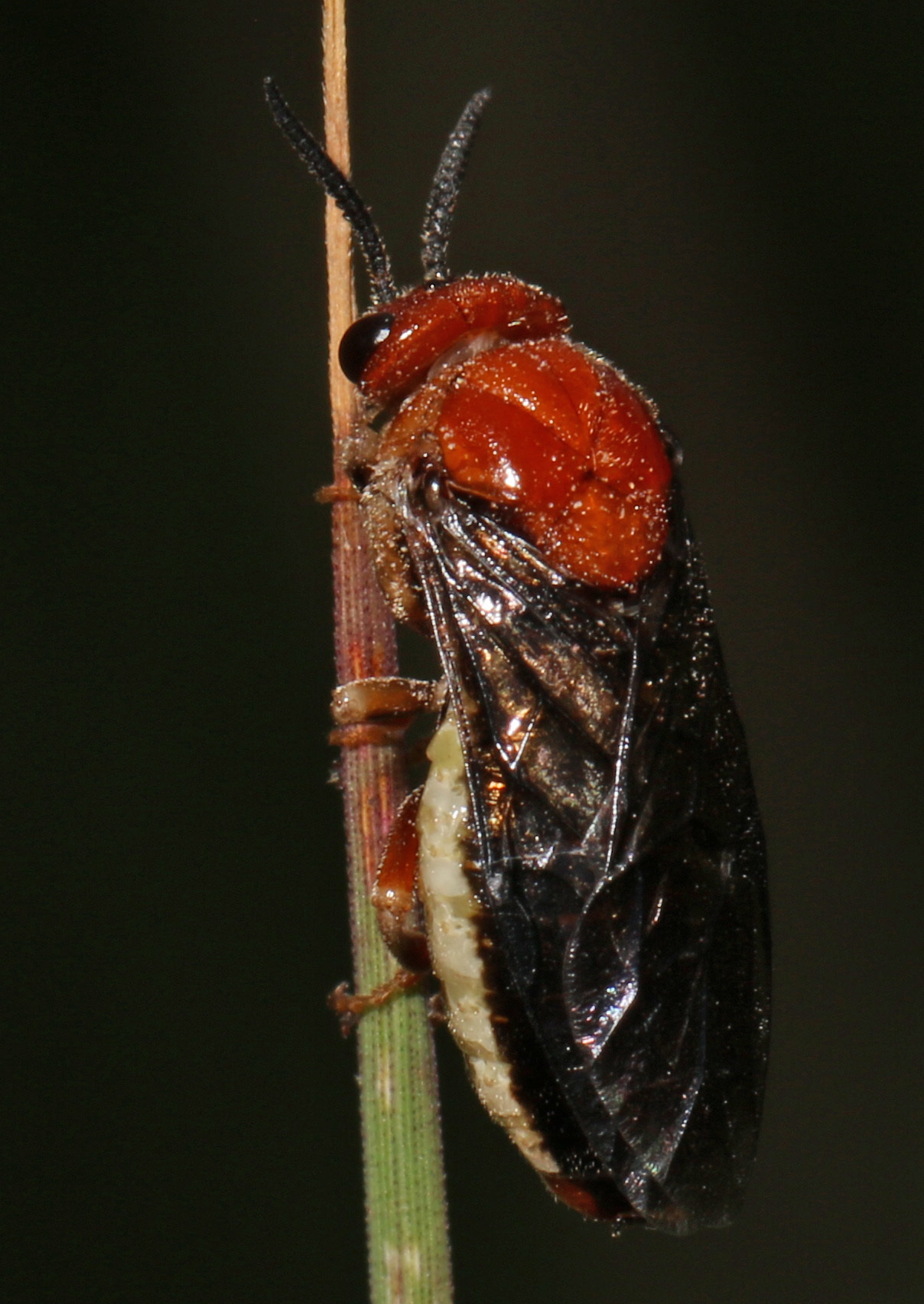

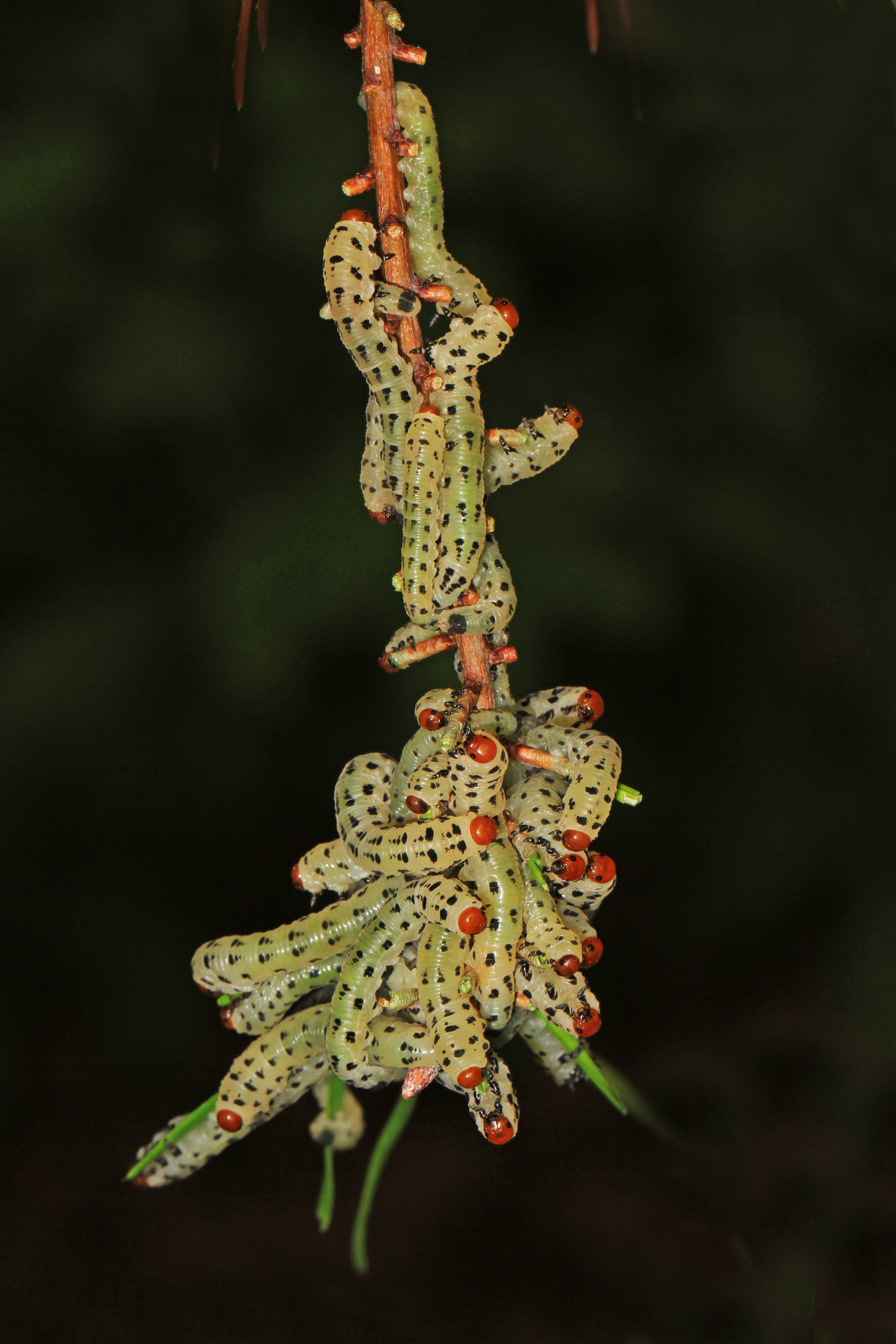
- Adult (top) and larvae (bottom)

Scientific classification
- Kingdom: Animalia
- Phylum: Arthropoda
- Clade: Pancrustacea
- Class: Insecta
- Order: Hymenoptera
- Suborder: Symphyta
- Family: Diprionidae
- Genus: Neodiprion
- Species: N. lecontei

Binomial name
- Neodiprion lecontei (Fitch, 1859)

Synonyms
- Lophyrus lecontei Smith, 1858

= Neodiprion lecontei =

Species of sawfly

Neodiprion lecontei is a species of sawfly in the family Diprionidae native to eastern North America, commonly known as the red-headed pine sawfly or Leconte's sawfly. The larvae feed on the foliage of many species of native and imported pines. This species was named after John Lawrence LeConte, an American entomologist of the 19th century.

== Taxonomy ==
It forms part of the N. lecontei species group, which consists of a clade of about twenty closely related species which have been intensively studied. The genome has been sequenced and consists of 330 MB arranged on seven chromosomes.

== Description ==
The adult N. lecontei has membranous wings and a broad waist and is between 5 and 8.5 mm (0.20 and 0.33 in) long, with the males being somewhat smaller than the females. Males have feathery antennae while females have serrated ones with nineteen segments. Males are entirely black and are more slender than the robust females, which have reddish-brown heads and thorax, and mainly black abdomens, sometimes with white on the sides. The larvae resemble the caterpillars of lepidopterans; young larvae are whitish with brown heads while older larvae are yellowish-green with up to eight longitudinal rows of black spots, and brown heads. They have three pairs of legs at the front and six to seven pairs of prolegs at the rear.

== Distribution ==
Neodiprion lecontei is native to eastern North America. Its range extends from southeastern Canada westwards to the Great Plains and southwards to Texas and Florida.

== Host range ==
The larvae feed on many members of the pine family. In the northern part of its range, it favours hard or yellow pines such as Pinus banksiana and Pinus resinosa. Further south, it prefers Pinus echinata, Pinus taeda, Pinus elliottii and Pinus palustris. Trees less than 5 m (16 ft) tall are frequently attacked, and plantations of pine established in the 1930s saw the insect reach pest proportions. Other host trees that the larvae will feed on include Pinus virginiana, Pinus strobus and Pinus sylvestris, and if nothing else is available, Picea abies, Cedrus deodara and Larix spp.

== Life cycle ==
The adult female sawfly cuts slits in pine needles with her ovipositor and deposits one egg in each slit. These appear pale and give the needle a banded appearance. The eggs hatch after about four weeks. The young larvae feed on the sides of the pine needle, leaving an uneaten central section which withers and dies, remaining on the tree giving a distinctive straw-like effect. Older larvae eat the whole needle before moving on to the next. The larvae are gregarious, and can strip whole branches and trees of needles. If the tree is completely defoliated, the larvae move as a group onto a neighboring tree, or may start chewing at the soft bark of twigs. When their development is finished, they drop to the ground and spin cocoons in the needle litter or underground. Here they overwinter as prepupae, pupating in the spring and biting their way out of one end of the cocoon to emerge as adults. Some individuals may not emerge as adults until the following year, or have an extended diapause. In the northern part of the range there is a single generation each year, but further south there may be two or three, sometimes overlapping, generations.
