= Neodiprion swainei =

Scientific classification
- Kingdom: Animalia
- Phylum: Arthropoda
- Clade: Pancrustacea
- Class: Insecta
- Order: Hymenoptera
- Suborder: Symphyta
- Family: Diprionidae
- Genus: Neodiprion
- Species: N. swainei

Binomial name
- Neodiprion swainei Middleton, 1931

Species of sawfly

Neodiprion swainei, the Swaine jack pine sawfly, is a species of sawfly in the family Diprionidae. It is found east of the Rocky Mountains in Canada from Alberta to Nova Scotia and in the Great Lake states of the United States.

Its primary host is the jack pine. Larvae feed more readily on older growth because current-year foliage contains a chemical deterrent. Other pines that may be defoliated if near an outbreak of this sawfly include red (Pinus resinosa), eastern white (Pinus strobus), and scotch (Pinus sylvestris) pines. Only minor infestations have occurred north of 49° N due to the low survival rate of larvae in the cold fall weather.
