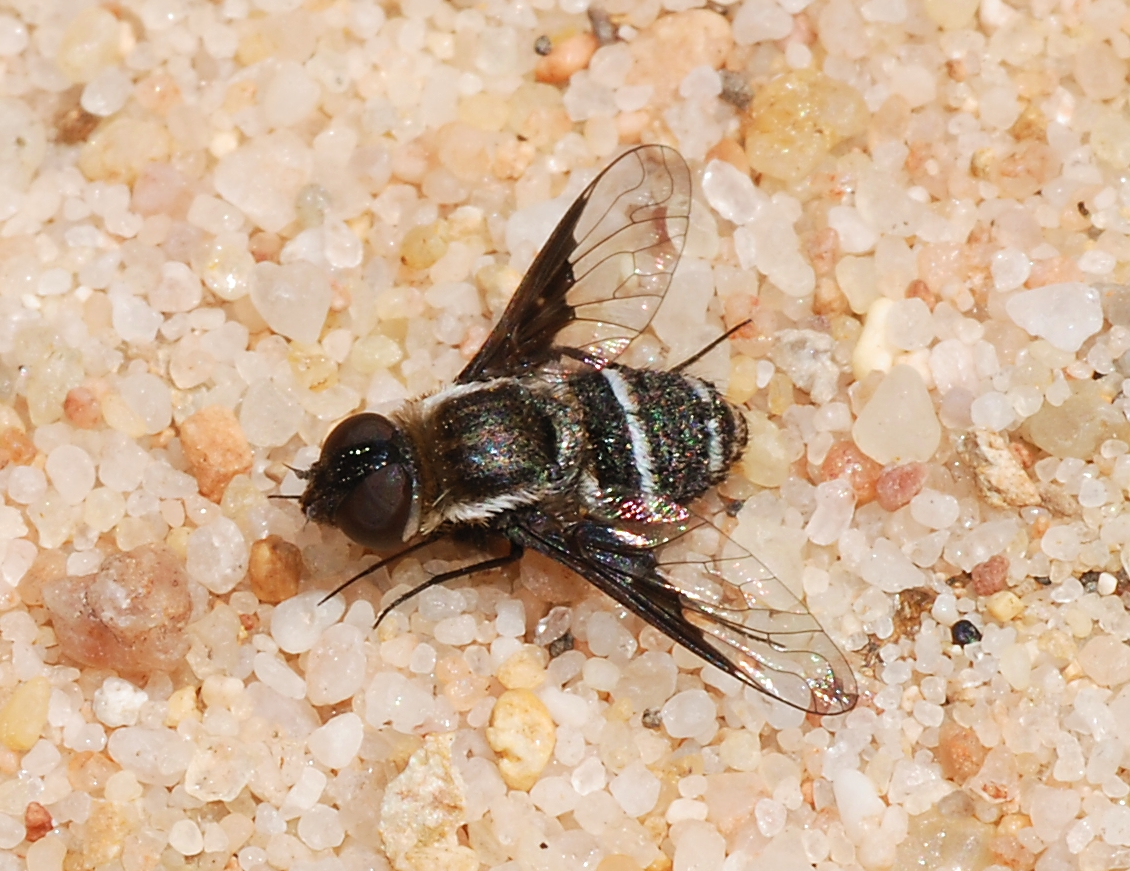
- Exhyalanthrax afer (Fabricius, 1794)

Scientific classification
- Kingdom: Animalia
- Phylum: Arthropoda
- Class: Insecta
- Order: Diptera
- Family: Bombyliidae
- Subfamily: Anthracinae
- Tribe: Villini
- Genus: Exhyalanthrax; Becker, 1916

Type species
- Anthrax vagans Loew 1862

= Exhyalanthrax =

Genus of flies

Exhyalanthrax is a small genus of bombyliid flies. Bombyliids are commonly known as bee flies due to their resemblance to bees. Exhyalanthrax are found in the Afrotropical realm and the Palearctic realm. Exhyalanthrax spp. are pupal parasitoids. Exhyalanthrax afer has been reared from pupae of tachinid and ichneumonid parasitoids of Thaumetopoea pityocampa and from the pupae of this species and other Lepidoptera. It has also been bred from cocoons of Neodiprion sertifer. Several African species have been reared from the puparia of tsetse flies and from puparia of other Diptera. An Exhyalanthrax sp. has also been found preying on cockroach, (Heterogamisca chopardi Uvarov) oothecae in Saudi Arabia. It has been suggested that Exhyalanthrax might be utilised as biological control agents especially in the battle against tsetse flies.

== Species List ==
- Exhyalanthrax abruptus (Loew, 1860)
- Exhyalanthrax afer (Fabricius, 1794)
- Exhyalanthrax argentifer Becker, 1916
- Exhyalanthrax canarionae Báez, 1990
- Exhyalanthrax collarti François, 1962
- Exhyalanthrax contrarius Becker, 1916
- Exhyalanthrax melanchlaenus (Loew, 1867)
- Exhyalanthrax muscarius (Pallas, 1818)
- Exhyalanthrax simonae (François, 1970)
- Exhyalanthrax vicinalis Hesse, 1956
