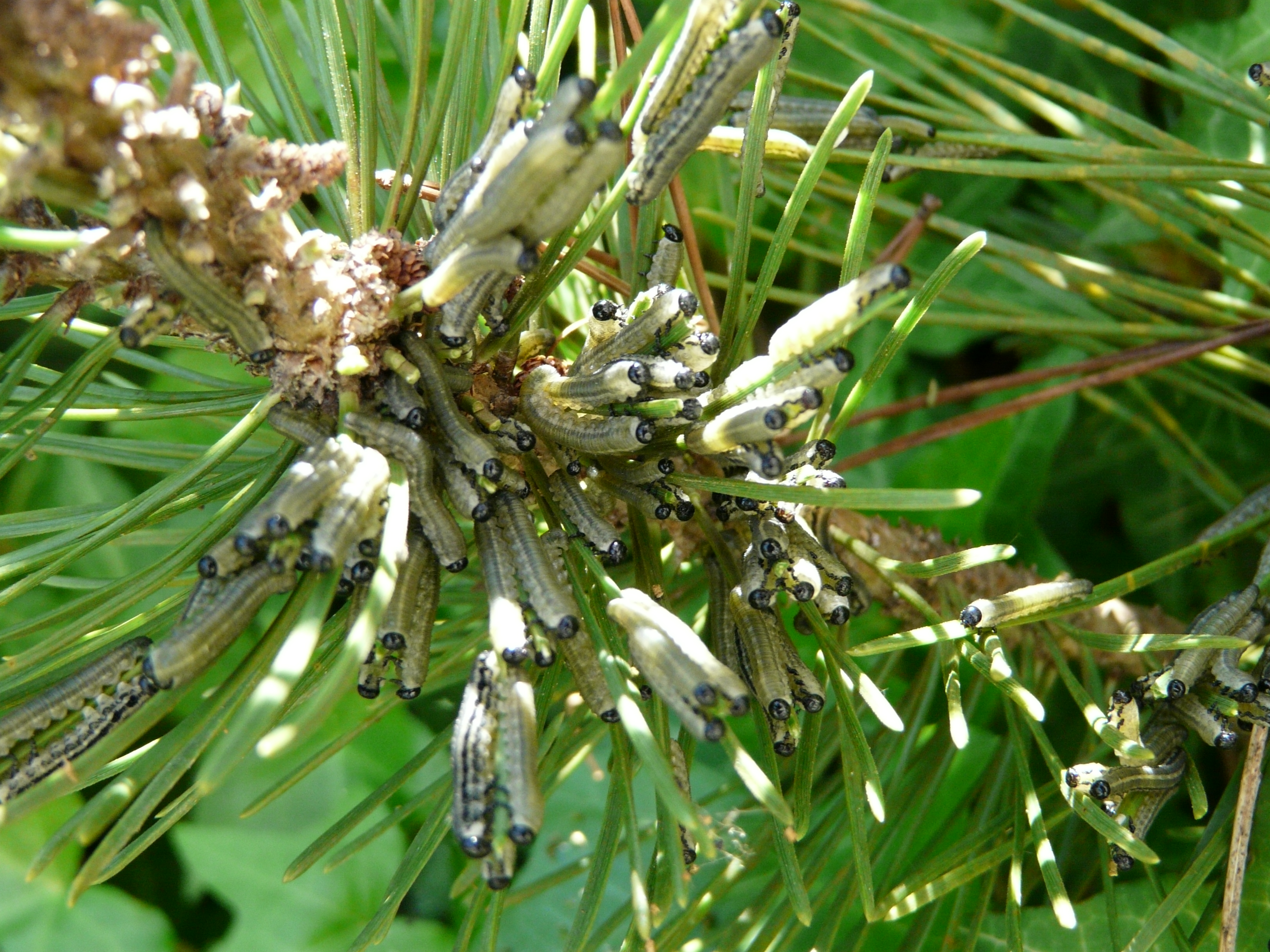
- Neodiprion sertifer larvae on a pine in Dordogne France

Scientific classification
- Kingdom: Animalia
- Phylum: Arthropoda
- Clade: Pancrustacea
- Class: Insecta
- Order: Hymenoptera
- Suborder: Symphyta
- Family: Diprionidae
- Genus: Neodiprion; Rohwer 1918

Species
- See text

= Neodiprion =

Genus of sawflies

Neodiprion is a genus of sawflies in the family Diprionidae.

== Species ==
- Neodiprion abbotii
- Neodiprion abietis (Harris)
- Neodiprion autumnalis
- Neodiprion burkei Middleton
- Neodiprion compar
- Neodiprion dubiosus Schedl
- Neodiprion excitans Rohwer
- Neodiprion fabricii
- Neodiprion hetricki
- Neodiprion knereri
- Neodiprion lecontei (Fitch)
- Neodiprion maurus
- Neodiprion merkeli Ross
- Neodiprion nanulus Schedl
- Neodiprion nigroscutum
- Neodiprion pinetum (Norton)
- Neodiprion pinirigidae
- Neodiprion pratti (Dyar)
- Neodiprion rugifrons Middleton
- Neodiprion sertifer (Geoffroy)
- Neodiprion swainei Middleton
- Neodiprion taedae Ross
- Neodiprion tsugae Middleton
- Neodiprion virginiana Rowher
- Neodiprion warreni
