= Pissodes affinis =

Scientific classification
- Domain: Eukaryota
- Kingdom: Animalia
- Phylum: Arthropoda
- Class: Insecta
- Order: Coleoptera
- Suborder: Polyphaga
- Infraorder: Cucujiformia
- Family: Curculionidae
- Genus: Pissodes
- Species: P. affinis

Binomial name
- Pissodes affinis Randall, 1838

Synonyms
- Pissodes curriei Hopkins, 1911

Species of beetle

Pissodes affinis is a species of true weevil in the beetle family Curculionidae. It is found in North America.
