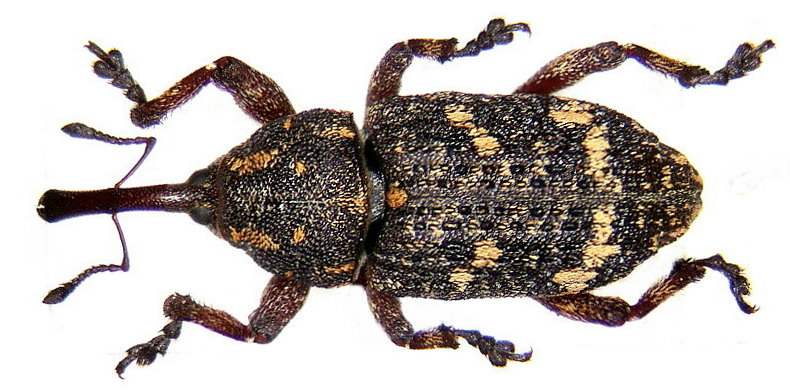
- Pissodes pini (6.2-8.5 mm)

Scientific classification
- Kingdom: Animalia
- Phylum: Arthropoda
- Class: Insecta
- Order: Coleoptera
- Suborder: Polyphaga
- Infraorder: Cucujiformia
- Family: Curculionidae
- Genus: Pissodes
- Species: P. pini

Binomial name
- Pissodes pini (Linnaeus, 1758)

= Pissodes pini =

Species of beetle

Pissodes pini is a species of weevil native to Europe.
