= Pissodes striatulus =

Scientific classification
- Domain: Eukaryota
- Kingdom: Animalia
- Phylum: Arthropoda
- Class: Insecta
- Order: Coleoptera
- Suborder: Polyphaga
- Infraorder: Cucujiformia
- Family: Curculionidae
- Genus: Pissodes
- Species: P. striatulus

Binomial name
- Pissodes striatulus (Fabricius, 1775)

Synonyms
- Pissodes dubius Randall, 1838; Pissodes fraseri Hopkins, 1911; Pissodes piperi Hopkins, 1911

Species of beetle

Pissodes striatulus, the balsam bark weevil, is a species of true weevil in the beetle family Curculionidae. It is found in North America.
