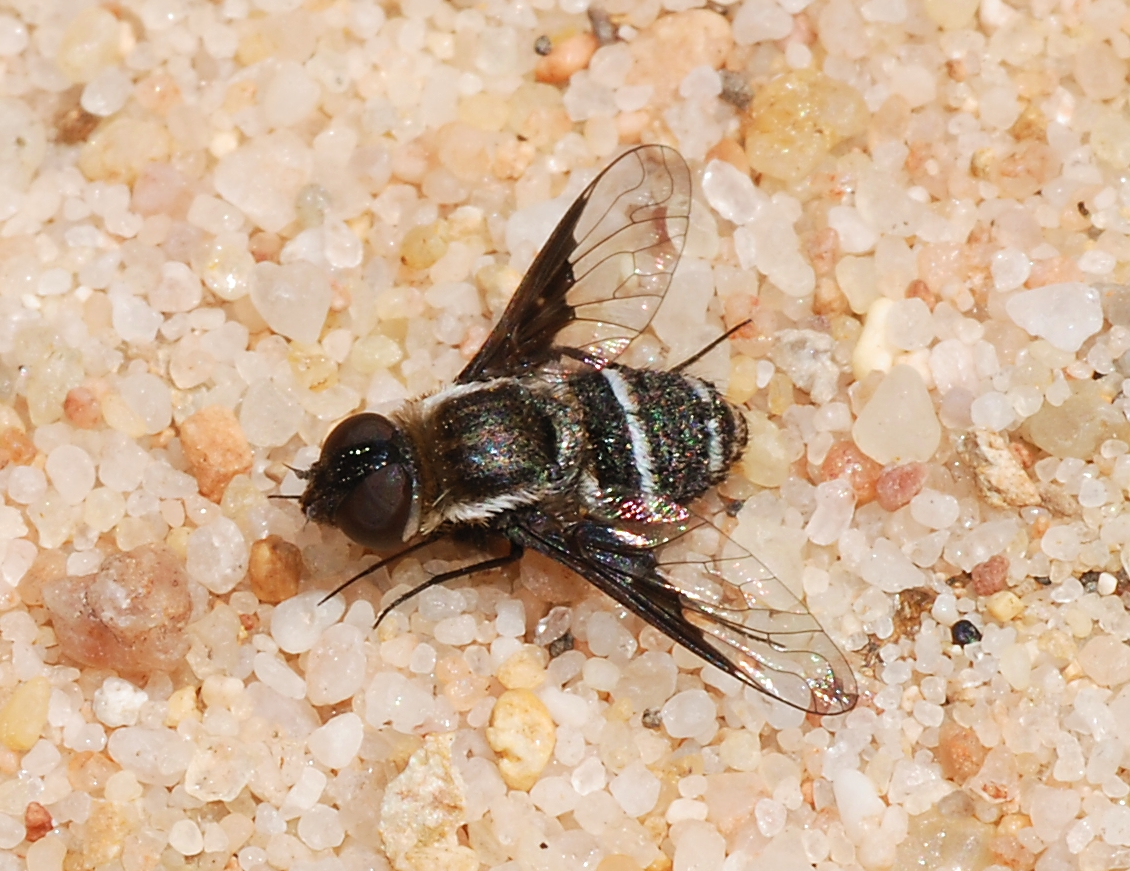
- Female

Scientific classification
- Kingdom: Animalia
- Phylum: Arthropoda
- Clade: Pancrustacea
- Class: Insecta
- Order: Diptera
- Family: Bombyliidae
- Subfamily: Anthracinae
- Tribe: Villini
- Genus: Exhyalanthrax
- Species: E. afer

Binomial name
- Exhyalanthrax afer Fabricius, 1794

Synonyms
- Anthrax afer Fabricius, 1794; Anthrax fimbriata Meigen, 1804; Anthrax sirius Hoffmansegg in Wiedemann, 1818; Anthrax hemipterus Pallas in Wiedemann, 1818; Anthrax marginalis Wiedemann in Meigen, 1820; Anthrax sirius Meigen, 1820; Anthrax tangerinus Bigot, 1892; Thyridanthrax burtti Hesse, 1956; Thyridanthrax aequisexus Bowden, 1964; Thyridanthrax decipiens Bowden, 196

= Exhyalanthrax afer =

Species of insect

Exhyalanthrax afer is a member of the fly family Bombyliidae first described by Johan Christian Fabricius in 1794.

== Biology ==
Larvae feed on pupae of tachinid and ichneumonid parasitoids of the pine processionary caterpillar, Thaumetopoea pityocampa, the pupae of other Lepidoptera and from cocoons of the pine sawfly, Neodiprion sertifer. Adults are most often seen visiting flowers to feed on nectar.

== Distribution ==
Afrotropical: Chad, Eritrea, Ghana, Kenya, Yemen. Oriental: Pakistan. Palaearctic: Afghanistan, Armenia, Austria, Azerbaijan, Belgium, Bulgaria, China (Beijing, Nei Monggol, Sichuan, Xinjiang, Xizang), Croatia, Cyprus, Czech Republic, Denmark, Egypt, France (incl. Corsica), Germany, Gibraltar, Greece (incl. Lesbos), Gruzia, Hungary, Iran, Israel, Italy (incl. Sardinia, Sicily), Kazakhstan, Kyrgyz Republic, Libya, Macedonia, Malta, Mongolia, Morocco, Netherlands, Oman, Poland, Portugal, Romania, Russia (WS), Saudi Arabia, Slovakia, Slovenia, Spain (incl. Ibiza, Mallorca), Switzerland, Tajikistan, Turkey, Turkmenistan, Ukraine, United Arab Emirates, Uzbekistan, Yugoslavia,
