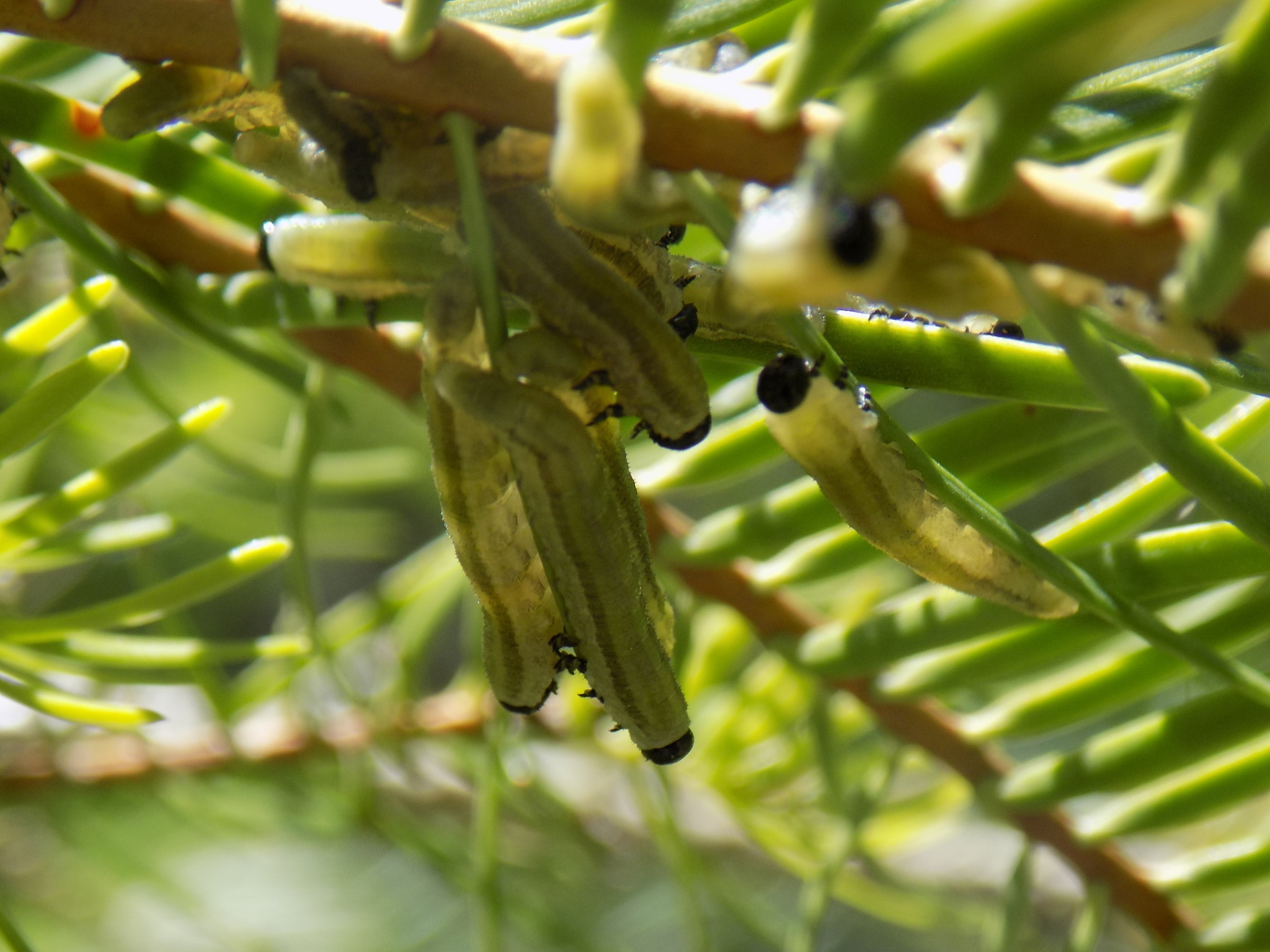
- Larvae eating fir needles

Scientific classification
- Kingdom: Animalia
- Phylum: Arthropoda
- Clade: Pancrustacea
- Class: Insecta
- Order: Hymenoptera
- Suborder: Symphyta
- Family: Diprionidae
- Genus: Neodiprion
- Species: N. abietis

Binomial name
- Neodiprion abietis (Harris, 1841)

= Neodiprion abietis =

Balsam fir sawfly

Species of sawfly

Neodiprion abietis, commonly known as the balsam fir sawfly, is a species of insect in the family Diprionidae. It is found in North America from Canada to northern Mexico and is phytophagous, feeding on the needles of coniferous trees.

== Evolutionary relationship ==
N. abietis is considered to arise from a monophyletic group.

== Internal anatomy ==
The larva of N. abietis have salivary glands with a lumen that is lined by microvilli and it also has a single layer of epithelial cells present. Moreover, they have fat body cells against the anterior duct of the lumen. Balsam fir sawfly have a pair of diverticular pouches which are used to store terpenoids which they regurgitate as a form of defense. These pouches are lined with a layer of an impermeable cuticle. The amount of liquid regurgitated is a reflection of the food that they ingest. The rectum of the Neodiprion abietis larva has a rectum similar to other Diprionidae. The rectum consists of a thin cuticle, a single layer of epithelial cells, and contains muscles.

== Physical characteristics ==
The heads of instars differ in color, newly hatched first instars have a light brown head and prior to molting into second instars, their heads change to a dark brown color. Their heads then turn black in color during the second to fifth instars. A range of 0.48 mm to 0.60 mm is seen with the size of head capsules. The stripes on their body also differ in larval instars. The first and second instar lack longitudinal stripes. The third, fourth, and fifth instar has three pairs of longitudinal dark stripes. The stripes on the third instar are considerably shorter than the fourth and fifth instar, while the stripes of the fourth and fifth instar are very similar causing difficulty for differentiating. The body color and length also varies between instars. Initially, a translucent body is seen, then becomes light green during the first instars. The body length rages anywhere from 2.43 mm to 3.15 mm. The antennas, more specifically their segments, differ between male and female. Male antennas consist of 21-23 segments while female antennas consist of 18-20 segments.

== Life cycle ==
In Newfoundland, Canada, female sawflies lay their eggs in late September or early October using their saw-like ovipositor into foliage of the current year or foliage of the previous year. The different strains of N. abietis are known to differ in host plant oviposition preference. Months later, around June or mid-July, the eggs hatch and the larvae feed immediately on needles of the balsam fir. The larvae prefer to eat 2 or 3-year-old balsam fir foliage and will rarely feed on foliage of the current year. The development of male and female sawfly vary slightly. Females can have five or six instars whereas males only have five instars. Secondly, females take slightly longer than males to complete their development. A female's developmental period lasts 35 days whereas males complete their development within 30 days. Male and female sawflies spin a cocoon during their last-instar larva, they pupate inside, and adults emerge from the cocoon within 2–3 weeks. Account differs concerning whether N. abietis will spin its cocoon on the foliage or in the ground.

== Reproduction ==
Mated females can produce male and female offspring while unmated females can only produce male offspring, a form of parthenogenesis known as arrhenotoky.

== Feeding ==
The balsam fir sawfly feeds on Abies balsamea, a type of fir, Picea glauca, Picea mariana types of spruce, and Larix laricina, a larch. The first instar feeds on the whole crown of one-year-old foliage following egg hatch and the larvae in a group feed together by moving from one shoot to another. Females, however, have a greater sensitivity to foliage than males and it’s suspected that it is due to their longer developmental time. N. abietis larvae have optimal development when they are able to feed on different-aged foliage thus allowing for maximization of their resources. Moreover, the balsam fir sawfly are considered to be wasteful feeders because only the outer portions of needles are consumed during the early-instar larvae. Late instars, however, consume more needle tissue type but it never consumes the needle in its entirety.

== Ecological importance ==
In eastern Canada, local outbreaks of N. abietis can last anywhere from 3 years to 5 years and have been shown to have a periodicity of about 10 years. Ecological factors involved in N. abietis outbreaks are increased immigration, female-biased sex ratios, and reduced mortality due to diseases, parasitoids and host-plant effects.

The outbreaks of the balsam fir sawfly cause a reduction in tree growth which in turn can cause tree mortality. The balsam fir sawfly, more specifically third to fifth instar larvae are responsible for defoliation and foliage weight loss in trees. Balsam fir sawfly defoliation does not stimulate the release of buds or shoots, which contributes to a slow recovery and severe impact on the balsam fir. N. abietis outbreaks have been documented to increase in intensity in thinned forests of Atlantic Canada.

Balsam fir outbreaks can be shortened by the application of a baculovirus known as nucelopolyhedrovirus (NeabNPV), which has been shown to be involved in the natural decline of balsam fir sawfly outbreaks. NeabNPV works by infecting the epithelial cells of the larvae midgut, this infection can be carried within the midgut through to adulthood. Neemix, an insect growth regulator has also been used to slow down larval and pupal development by decreasing pupal weight, and can reduce the ability of the adults to emerge from their cocoon.
