= Pissodes rotundatus =

Scientific classification
- Kingdom: Animalia
- Phylum: Arthropoda
- Class: Insecta
- Order: Coleoptera
- Suborder: Polyphaga
- Infraorder: Cucujiformia
- Family: Curculionidae
- Genus: Pissodes
- Species: P. rotundatus

Binomial name
- Pissodes rotundatus LeConte, 1876

Synonyms
- Pissodes alascensis Hopkins, 1911; Pissodes nigrae Hopkins, 1911

Species of beetle

Pissodes rotundatus, the small spruce weevil, is a species of true weevil in the beetle family Curculionidae. It is found in North America.
