= Pissodes similis =

Scientific classification
- Domain: Eukaryota
- Kingdom: Animalia
- Phylum: Arthropoda
- Class: Insecta
- Order: Coleoptera
- Suborder: Polyphaga
- Infraorder: Cucujiformia
- Family: Curculionidae
- Genus: Pissodes
- Species: P. similis

Binomial name
- Pissodes similis Hopkins, 1911

Synonyms
- Pissodes utahensis Hopkins, 1911

Species of beetle

Pissodes similis is a species of true weevil in the beetle family Curculionidae. It is found in North America.
