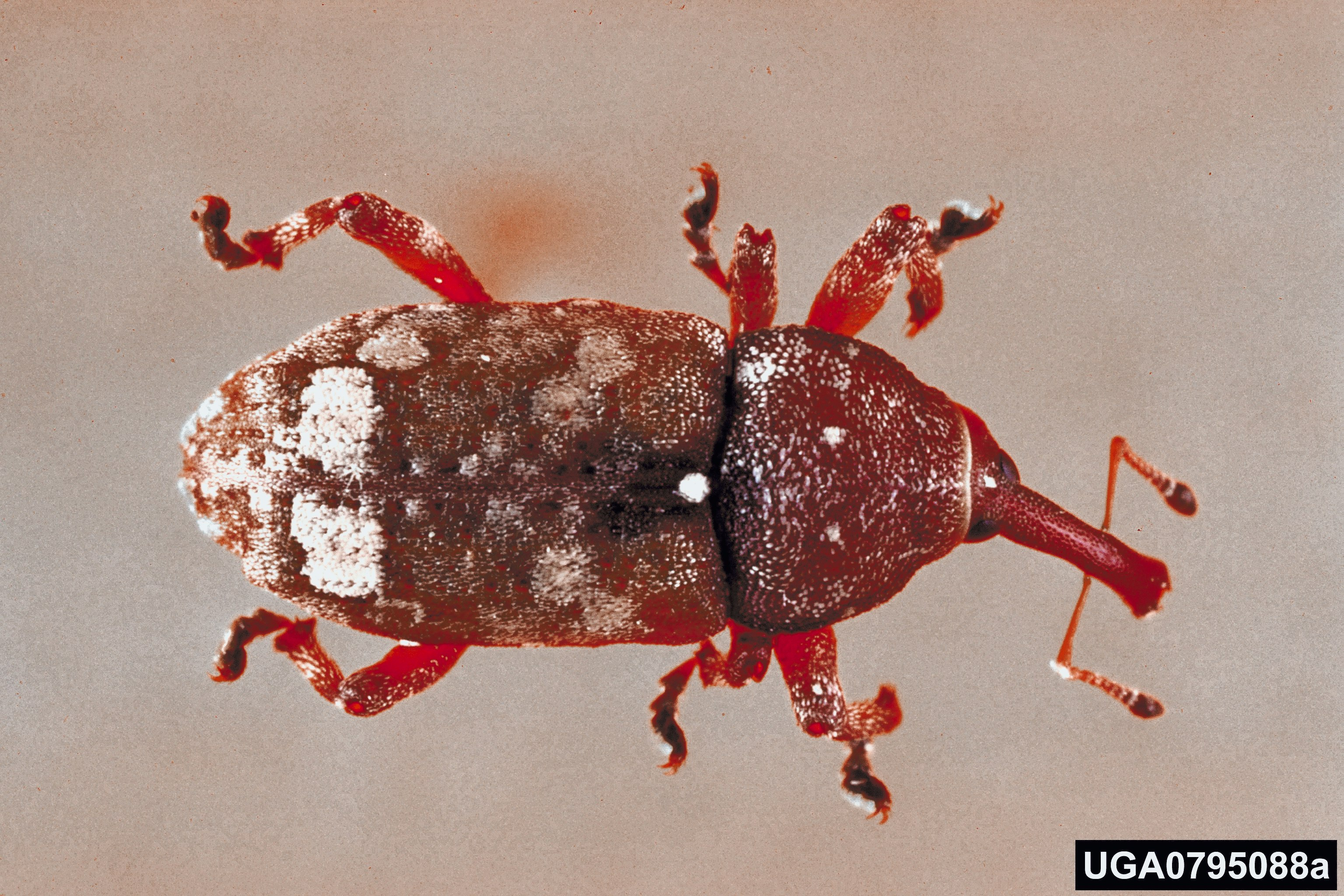
- An adult Pissodes nemorensis

Scientific classification
- Domain: Eukaryota
- Kingdom: Animalia
- Phylum: Arthropoda
- Class: Insecta
- Order: Coleoptera
- Suborder: Polyphaga
- Infraorder: Cucujiformia
- Family: Curculionidae
- Genus: Pissodes
- Species: P. nemorensis

Binomial name
- Pissodes nemorensis Germar, 1824

Synonyms
- Pissodes deodarae Hopkins, 1911

= Pissodes nemorensis =

Species of beetle

Pissodes nemorensis, known generally as the eastern pine weevil or deodar weevil, is a species of true weevil in the beetle family Curculionidae. It is found in North America and Africa. Deodar weevils are considered a forest pest in the United States, with adults and larvae feeding on a variety of coniferous tree species, including trees such as deodar cedar (Cedrus deodara), loblolly pine (Pinus taeda), longleaf pine (Pinus palustris), sand pine (Pinus clausa), shortleaf pine (Pinus echinata), slash pine (Pinus elliottii), and spruce pine (Pinus glabra) Trees of all ages are susceptible to weevil infestations, while trees that are severely stressed by fire, drought, extreme cold, fusiform rust, wind damage, and other problems are prone to weevil infestation. In well-managed pine stands, deodar weevil infestations are sporadic, attacking only the suppressed and unhealthy trees throughout the area. Because they do not typically effect healthy trees, they do not usually alter traditional management strategies. Unlike many other forest pests in the eastern United States, deodar weevils are most active in the winter months, and this is often when sign of infestations can be seen. The best way to avoid a deodar weevil infestation is to maintain good tree and stand health: healthy trees do not typically face mortality or extensive damage from these pests. If an infestation has occurred, pesticides can be used in the fall as the weevils become active, but are typically not recommended.

== Description ==
=== Adult ===
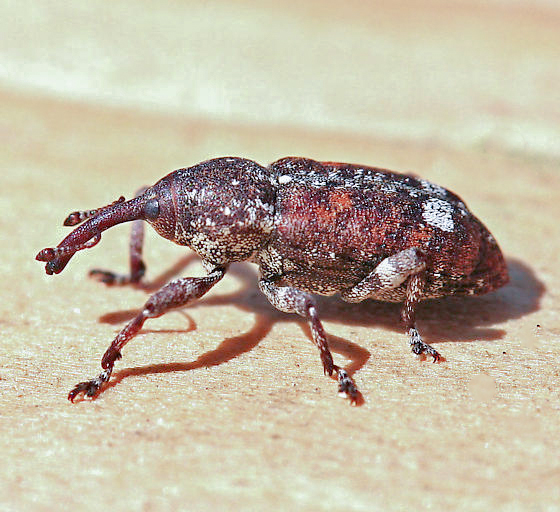
Eastern pine weevil (Pissodes nemorensis) lateral view

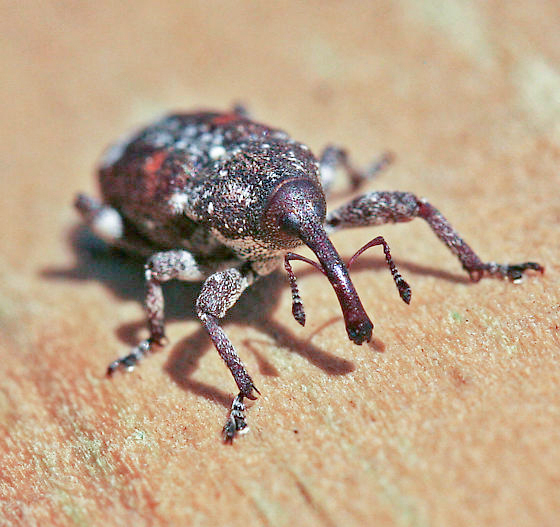
Eastern pine weevil (Pissodes nemorensis) anterior view

Deodar weevils adults are approximately 7mm long; can range from a rusty red to grayish brown in color on the head and the body. Like most other weevil species have a long snout (or proboscis) and a small head. They also have the weevil clubbed antennae that are 'elbowed' located near the tip of the snout. On the top of the thorax, there are two distinct white spots. An additional spot occurs on the thorax at the base of the wings (the scutellum). The abdomen can have various splotchy patterns along the wing casings (elytra) with two larger white spots or splotches on the rear or posterior portion.

=== Pupa ===
Similar in size and shape as the adult weevils, but are instead a creamy white color. The legs are crumpled beneath the already well formed proboscis. Their wing pads are wrapped around the thorax, and the head has low spines. As they approach time to molt, their shell darkens to shades more similar to the adult form.

=== Larvae ===
Newly hatched larvae are small (<2mm) growing to 12mm when mature. Much like other beetle larvae, deodar weevil larvae have a plump white ridged and legless abdomen, and an amber to brown helmet head.

== Biology and reproduction ==
Adult weevils become active in fall, feed and mate, and females lay eggs in the holes made while feeding in the bark. Newly hatched grubs bore under the bark where they feed, molt, and grow. The pupae occupy chambers (chip cocoons) made by the larvae. Adult weevils begin emerging in March but most of the new adult weevils emerge in May (small circular escape holes are sometimes noticed on infested stems). The new weevils apparently aestivate during the summer and become active as the weather cools down in the fall when they infest stressed trees, feed and mate.

Deodar weevils usually don't infest trees younger than age 5 (they need stems large enough to support larval galleries). Deodar weevils tend to infest the bottom 10 feet of the main stem. These weevil grubs feed beneath the bark and sometimes girdle the stem causing it to die from the damaged portion outward. The bark may swell over the feeding areas. Deodar weevils have killed trees up to 36 feet tall as the weevils attack the lower trunk. Infested shoots may die, causing excessive branching. In addition, deodar weevils can vector pitch canker (Fusarium moniliforme) The weevils are active all winter long and lay one to four or five eggs in the inner bark in holes chewed through the bark, but fall is the peak time for adult feeding and breeding. The weevils do some minor damage as they feed on the bark before laying their eggs. There is one generation per year.
