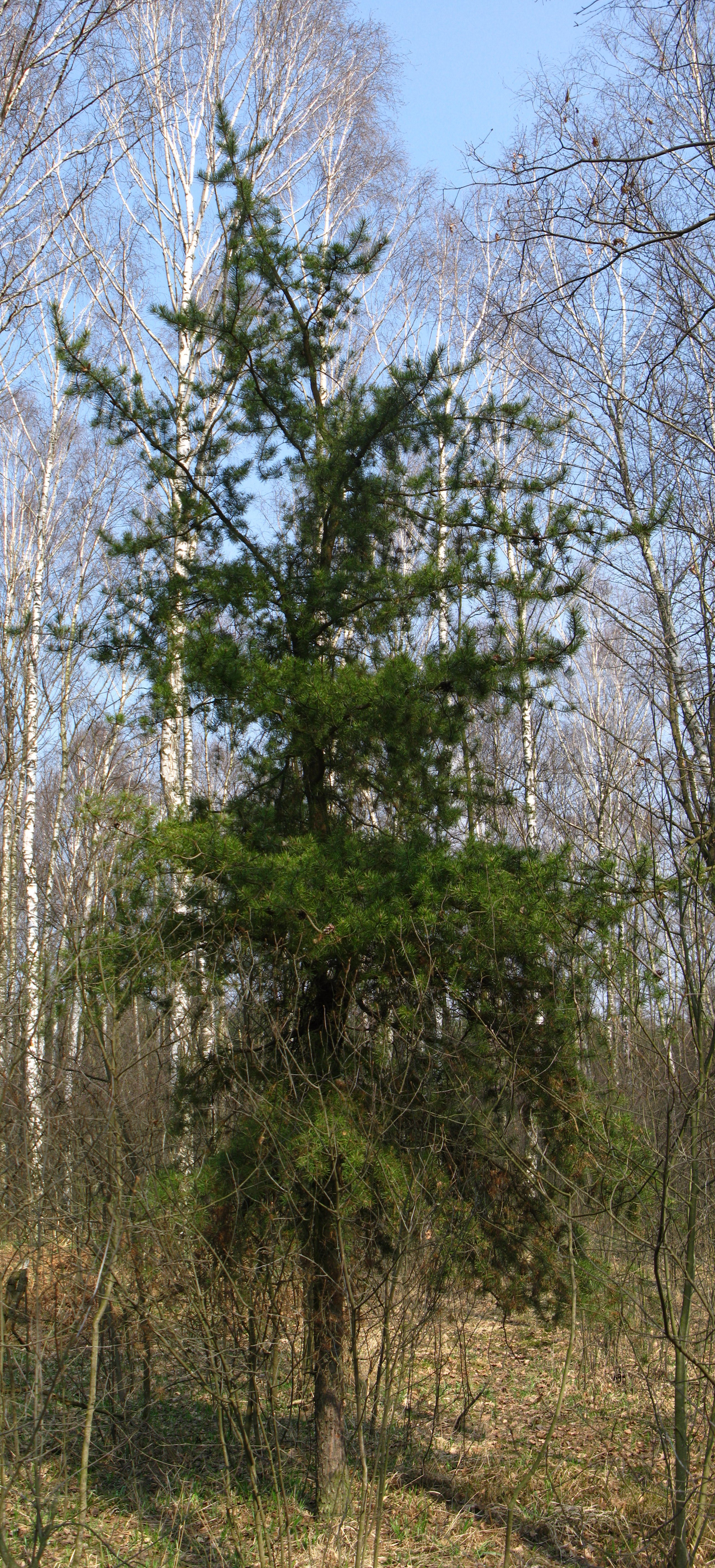
- Young jack pine

Conservation status
- Least Concern (IUCN 3.1)

- Secure (NatureServe)

Scientific classification
- Kingdom: Plantae
- Clade: Tracheophytes
- Clade: Gymnosperms
- Division: Pinophyta
- Class: Pinopsida
- Order: Pinales
- Family: Pinaceae
- Genus: Pinus
- Subgenus: P. subg. Pinus
- Section: P. sect. Trifoliae
- Subsection: P. subsect. Contortae
- Species: P. banksiana

Binomial name
- Pinus banksiana Lamb.
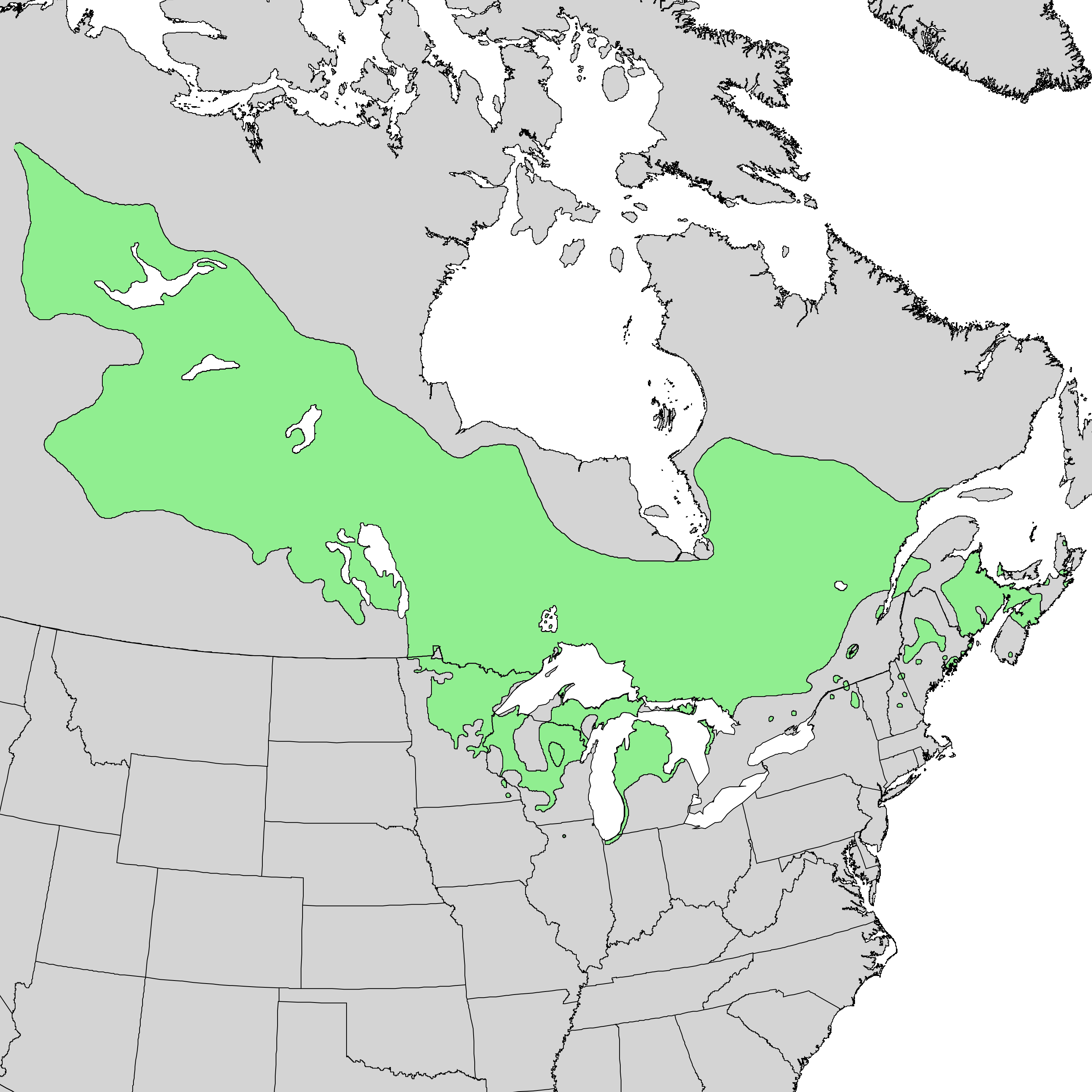
- Native range

Synonyms
- Pinus divaricata (Aiton) Dum.Cours.; Pinus divaricata (Aiton) Sudw. nom. illeg.; Pinus hudsonica Poir.; Pinus rupestris Michx.f.; Pinus sylvestris var. divaricata Aiton

= Jack pine =

Species of tree

Jack pine (Pinus banksiana), also known as grey pine or scrub pine, is a species of conifer in the family Pinaceae, a North American pine.

== Description ==
Pinus banksiana ranges from 9–22 metres (30–72 ft) in height. Some jack pines are shrub-sized, due to poor growing conditions. Although it varies among populations, jack pine trees do not usually grow particularly straight, resulting in an irregular shape similar to that of pitch pine (Pinus rigida). This pine often forms pure stands on sandy or rocky soil. Many populations are adapted to stand-replacing fires, with the cones remaining closed for many years, until a forest fire kills the mature trees and opens the cones, reseeding the burnt ground. Other populations have not been shaped by regular stand-replacing fires and have reduced serotiny. A population on the Maine coast is apparently not reliant on fire for reproduction, and some stands have developed several age classes. Populations with lower serotiny are often found on soils that are in some way limiting to faster-growing competition, such as soils shallow to bedrock, shallow to water table, or very young soils.

Its leaves are needle-shaped, evergreen, in fascicles of two, needle-like, straight or slightly twisted, stiff, sharp-pointed, light yellowish-green, spread apart; edges toothed and 2–4 cm (3/4–1 1/2 in) long. The bundle-sheath is persistent. The buds are blunt pointed, up to 15 mm long, reddish-brown, and resinous. On vigorous shoots, there is more than one cyclic component. The bark is thin, reddish-brown to gray in color in juvenile stages. As the tree matures it becomes dark brown and flaky. The wood is moderately hard and heavy, weak, light brown colour. The seed cones vary in shape, being rectangular to oval, cone shaped, straight or curved inward. The cones are 3–5 cm (1 1/4–2 in) long, the scales with a small, fragile prickle that usually wears off before maturity, leaving the cones smooth.

Unusually for a pine, the cones normally point forward along the branch, sometimes curling around it. That is an easy way to tell it apart from the similar lodgepole pine in more western areas of North America. The cones on many mature trees are serotinous. They open when exposed to intense heat, greater than or equal to 50 °C (122 °F).

== Taxonomy ==
In the far west of its range, P. banksiana hybridizes readily with the closely related lodgepole pine (P. contorta).

The species epithet banksiana is after the English botanist Sir Joseph Banks.

== Distribution and habitat ==
Its native range in Canada is east of the Rocky Mountains from the Mackenzie River in the Northwest Territories to Cape Breton Island in Nova Scotia, and the north-central and northeast of the United States from Minnesota to Maine, with the southernmost part of the range just into northwest Indiana and northwest Pennsylvania.

== Ecology ==
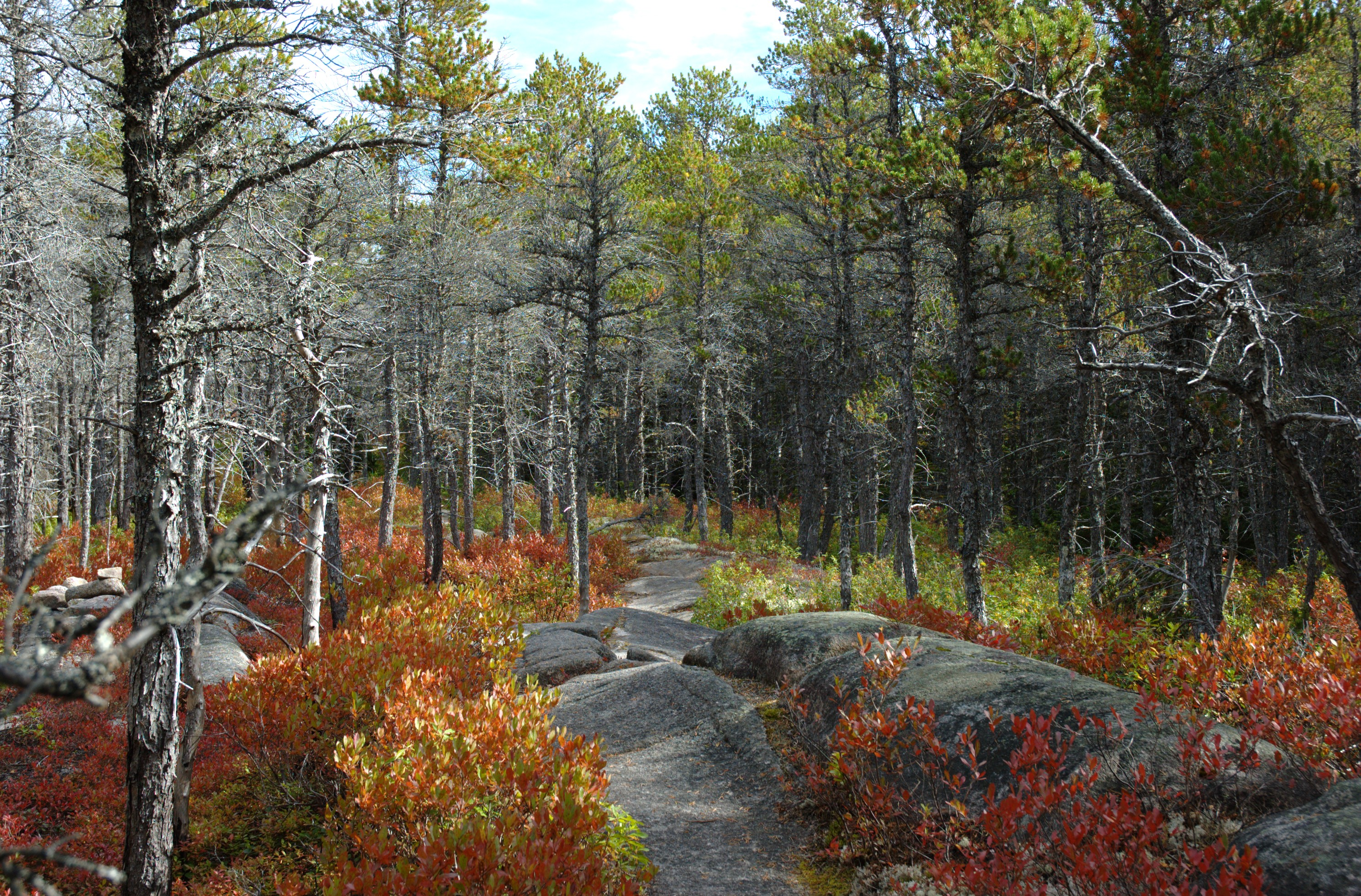
P. banksiana forest with Vaccinium groundcover in Neil's Harbour, Nova Scotia

Kirtland's warbler (Setophaga kirtlandii), a formerly endangered bird, depends on pure stands of young jack pine in a very limited area in the north of the Lower and Upper Peninsulas of Michigan for breeding. Most known nesting areas are limited to Crawford, Oscoda, and Ogemaw counties. Mature jack pine forests are usually open and blueberries are often abundant in the understory.

Young jack pines are an alternate host for sweet fern blister rust (Cronartium comptoniae). Infected sweet ferns (Comptonia peregrina) release powdery orange spores in the summer and nearby trees become infected in the fall. Diseased trees show vertical orange cankers on the trunk and galls on the lower branches. The disease does not tend to affect older trees.

Jack pines are also susceptible to scleroderris canker (Gremmeniella abietina). This disease manifests by yellowing at the base of the needles. Prolonged exposure may lead to eventual death of the tree.

Insects that attack jack pine stands include the white pine weevil (Pissodes strobi), Swaine jack pine sawfly (Neodiprion swainei), and jack pine budworm (Choristoneura pinus).

Fossil evidence shows the jack pine survived the glacial period in the Appalachian and Ozark Mountains.

== Uses ==
Like other species of pine, Pinus banksiana has use as timber, although its wood tends to be knotty and not highly resistant to decay. Products include pulpwood, fuel, decking, and utility poles.

== Gallery ==
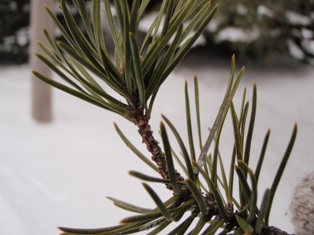
Foliage

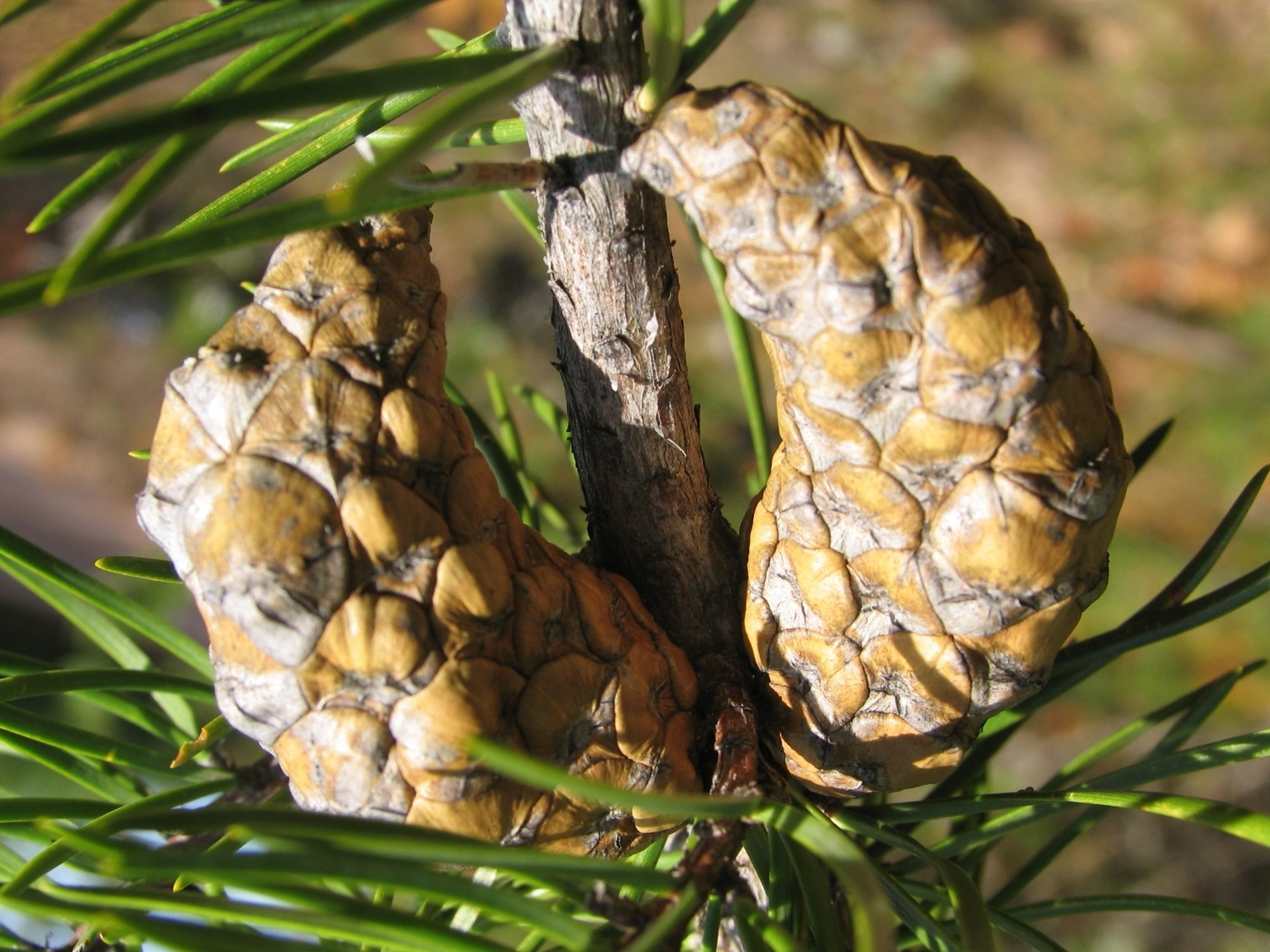
Closed, mature cones

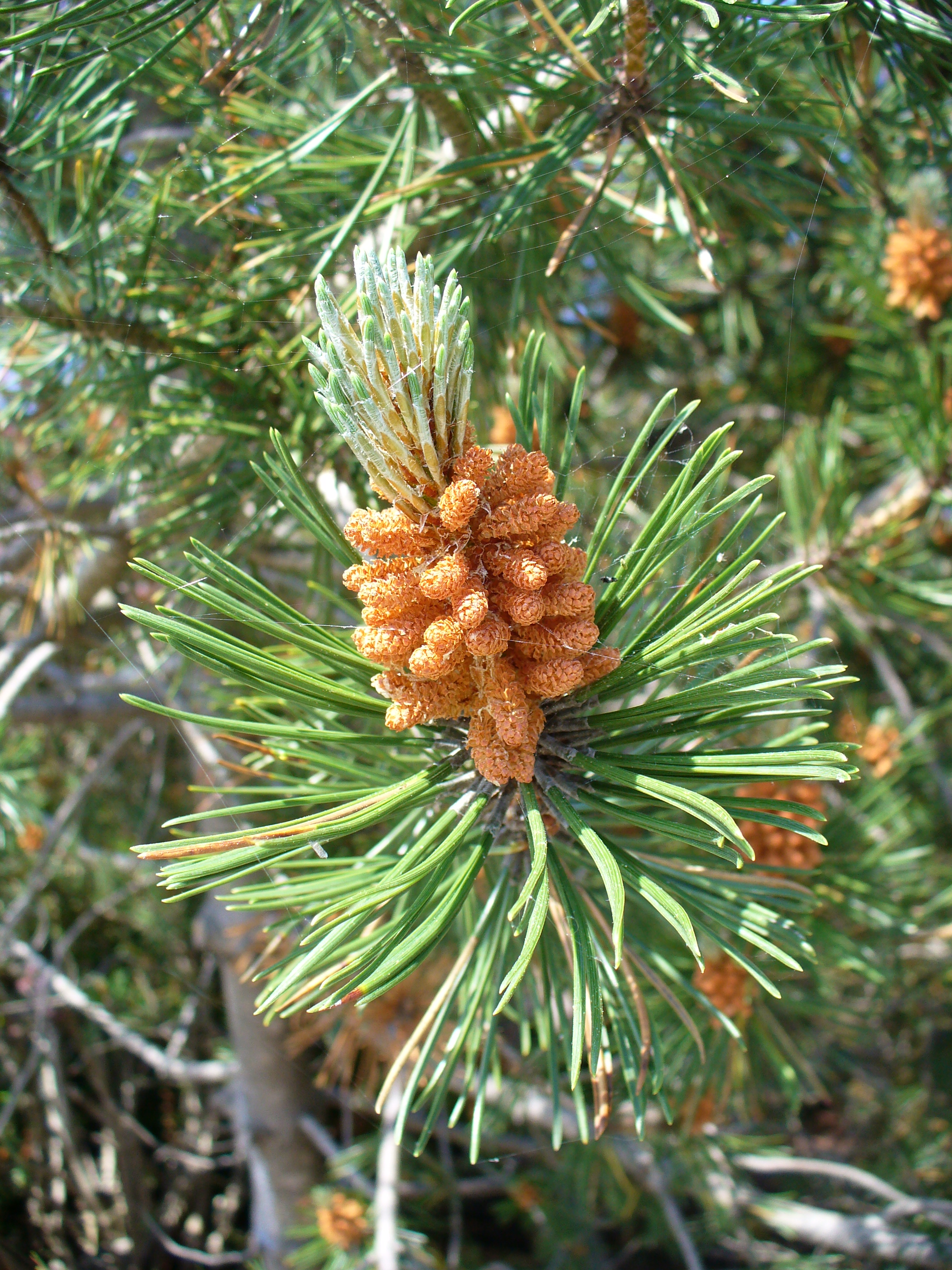
Pollen cones

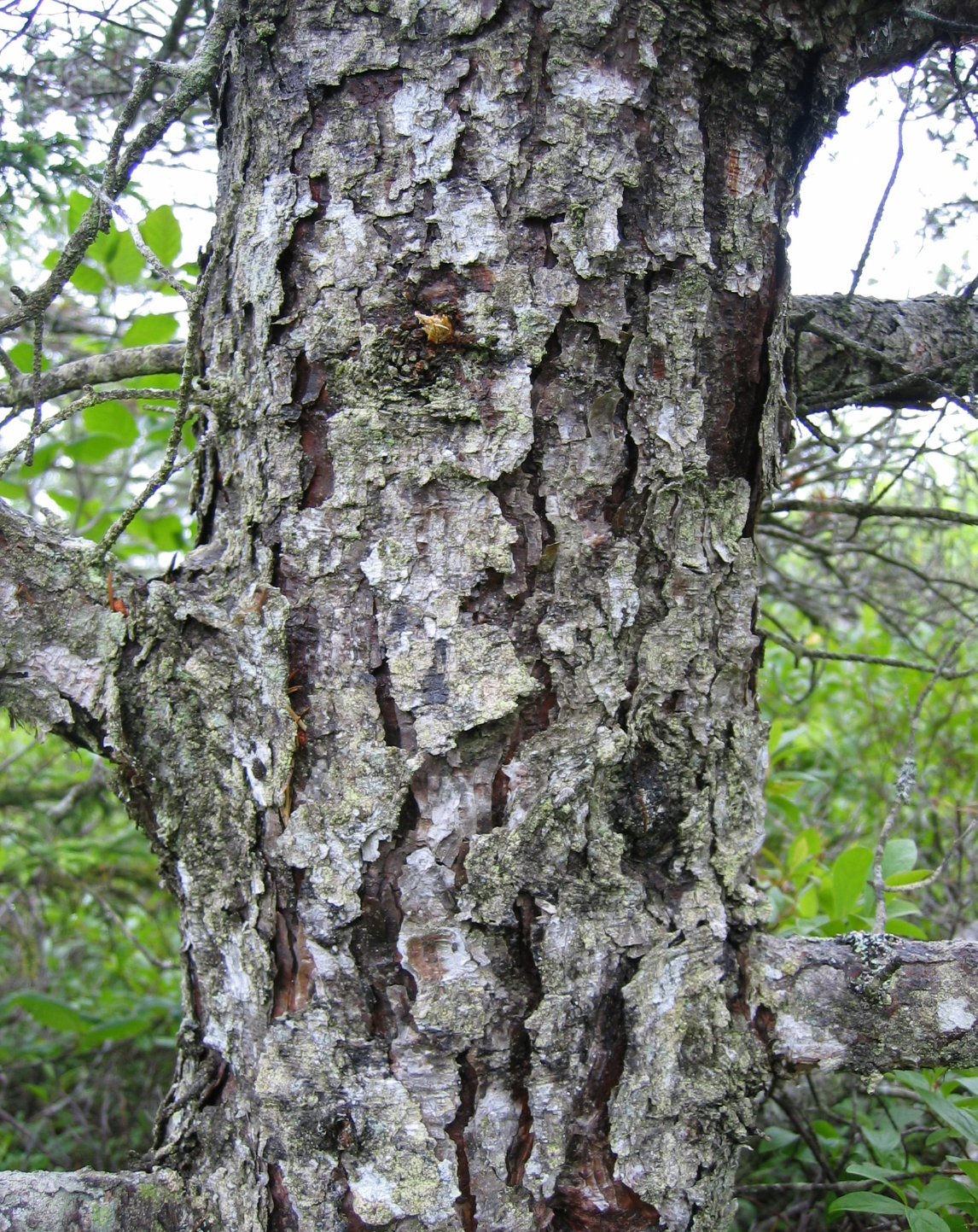
Bark

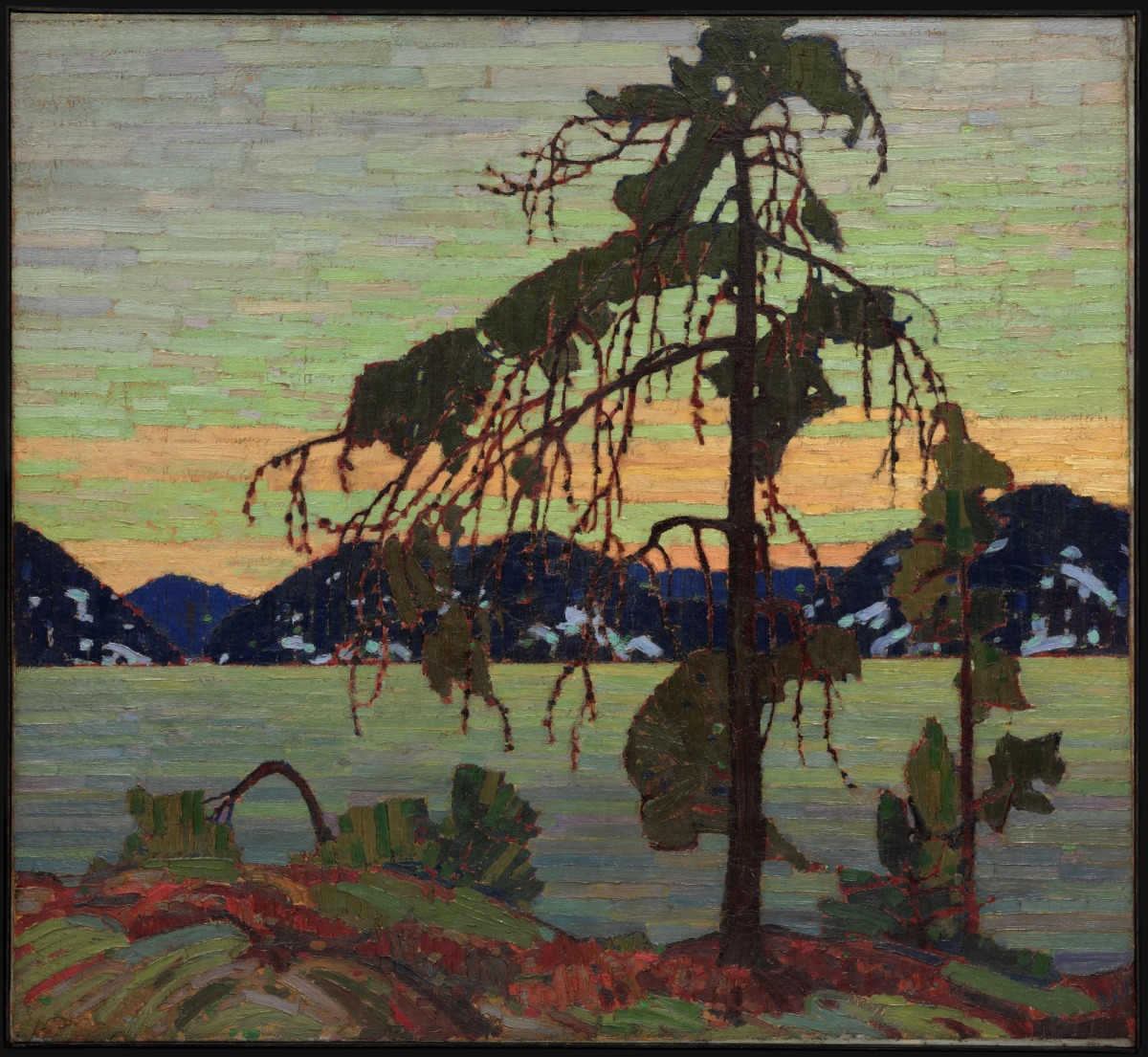
The Jack Pine (1917) by Tom Thomson, painted in Algonquin Park, Ontario

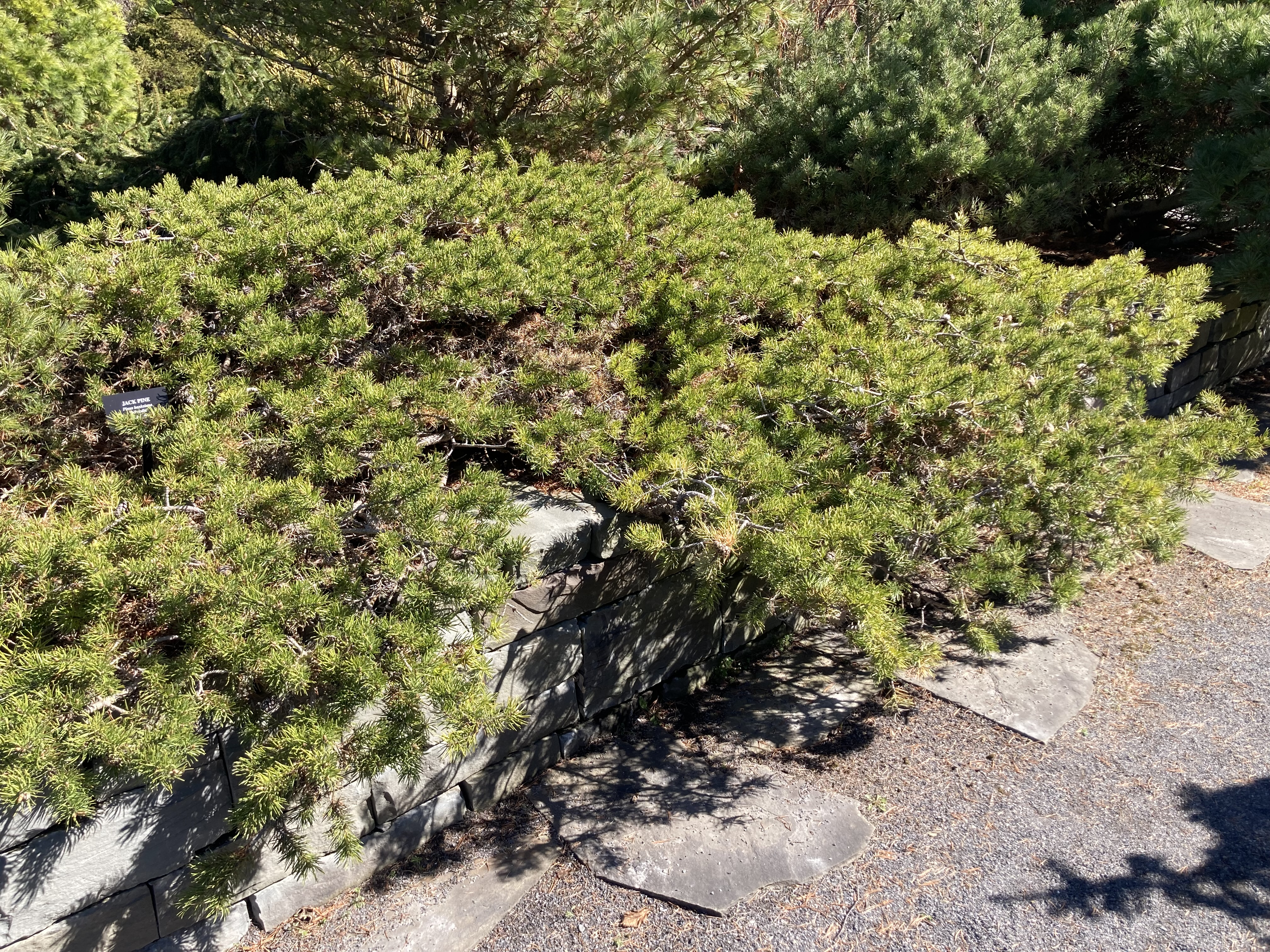
Creeping cultivar of Jack Pine called 'Schoodic'.
