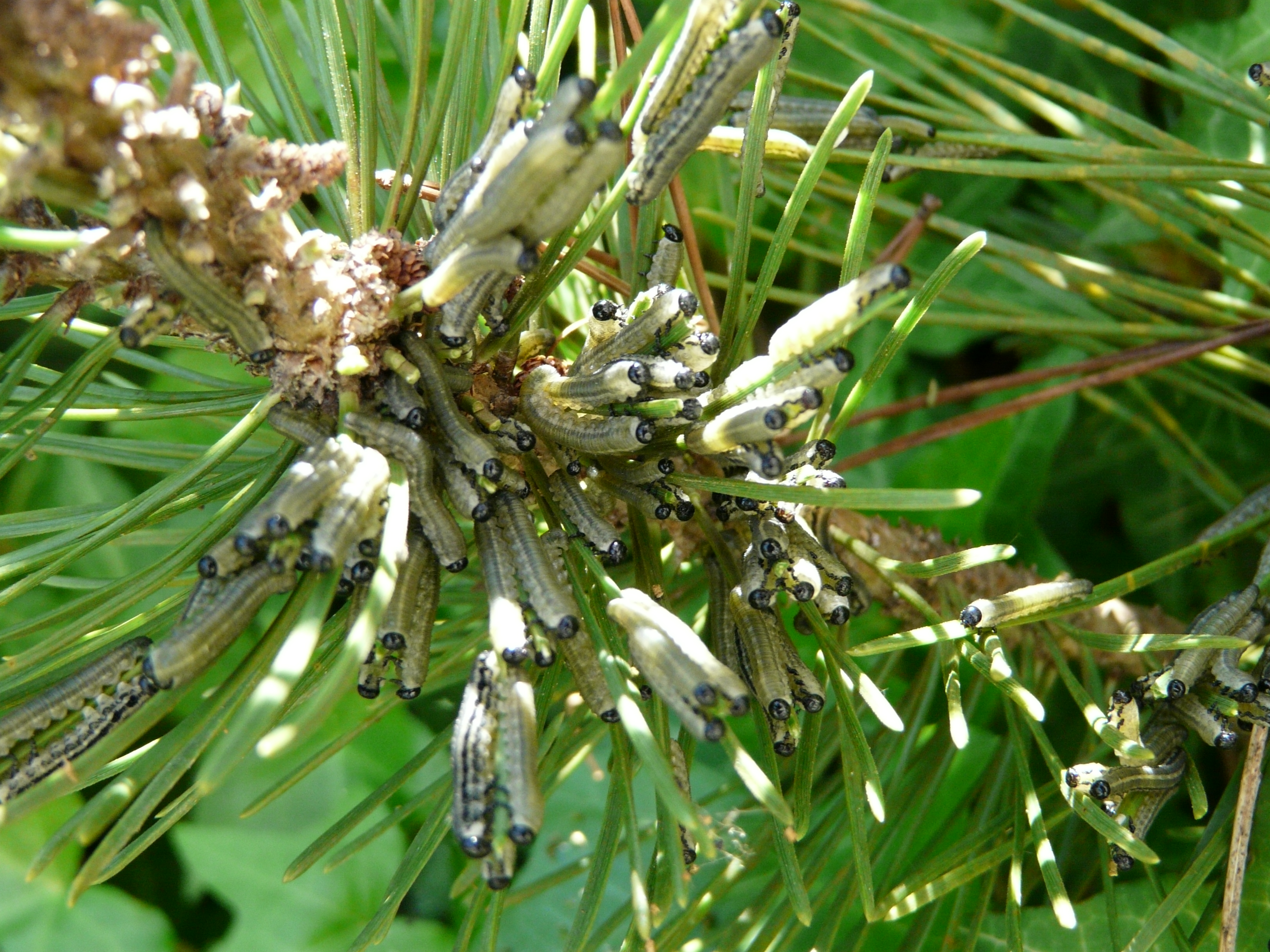
- Neodiprion sertifer larvae on a pine in Dordogne France

Scientific classification
- Kingdom: Animalia
- Phylum: Arthropoda
- Clade: Pancrustacea
- Class: Insecta
- Order: Hymenoptera
- Suborder: Symphyta
- Family: Diprionidae
- Genus: Neodiprion
- Species: N. sertifer

Binomial name
- Neodiprion sertifer (Geoffroy) 1785

= Neodiprion sertifer =

Species of sawfly

Neodiprion sertifer, the European pine sawfly, is a sawfly species in the genus Neodiprion. Native to Europe, it was accidentally introduced to North America in 1925, where it has established itself as a commercial pest.

The larvae of Exhyalanthrax afer feed on N. sertifer cocoons.

== Life cycle ==
The European pine sawfly typically hatches from early April to late May. The larvae feed on existing pine needles. When they mature, they spin into cocoons. In the fall, they leave their cocoons as wasp-like creatures and mate. September and October are when the female lays eggs in pine trees for the next generation. Their favorite trees are Scots pine, red pine, Jack pine, and Japanese pines.

== Pest ==
The European pine sawfly is a pest as it eats a lot of needles. While this can stunt the growth of the tree, it rarely is enough to kill the tree. For controlling it, one can use natural parasites, remove the eggs from the tree, or spray pesticides. Any standard pesticide sprayed on them during their larval stage will kill them. Spraying is usually done very early, often as soon as they are seen.

== Biochemistry ==
The caterpillars contain chemical compounds including (+)-Catechin 7-O-β-glucoside, isorhamnetin 3,7,4′-tri-O-β-glucoside, kaempferol 3,7,4′-tri-O-β-glucoside and quercetin 3,7,4′-tri-O-β-glucoside; these have been isolated from the hemolymph. None of these compounds is present in the needles of P. sylvestris, therefore, these flavonoid glucosides are produced by the larvae from flavonoid monoglucosides and (+)-catechin obtained from the pine needles.

== Gallery ==
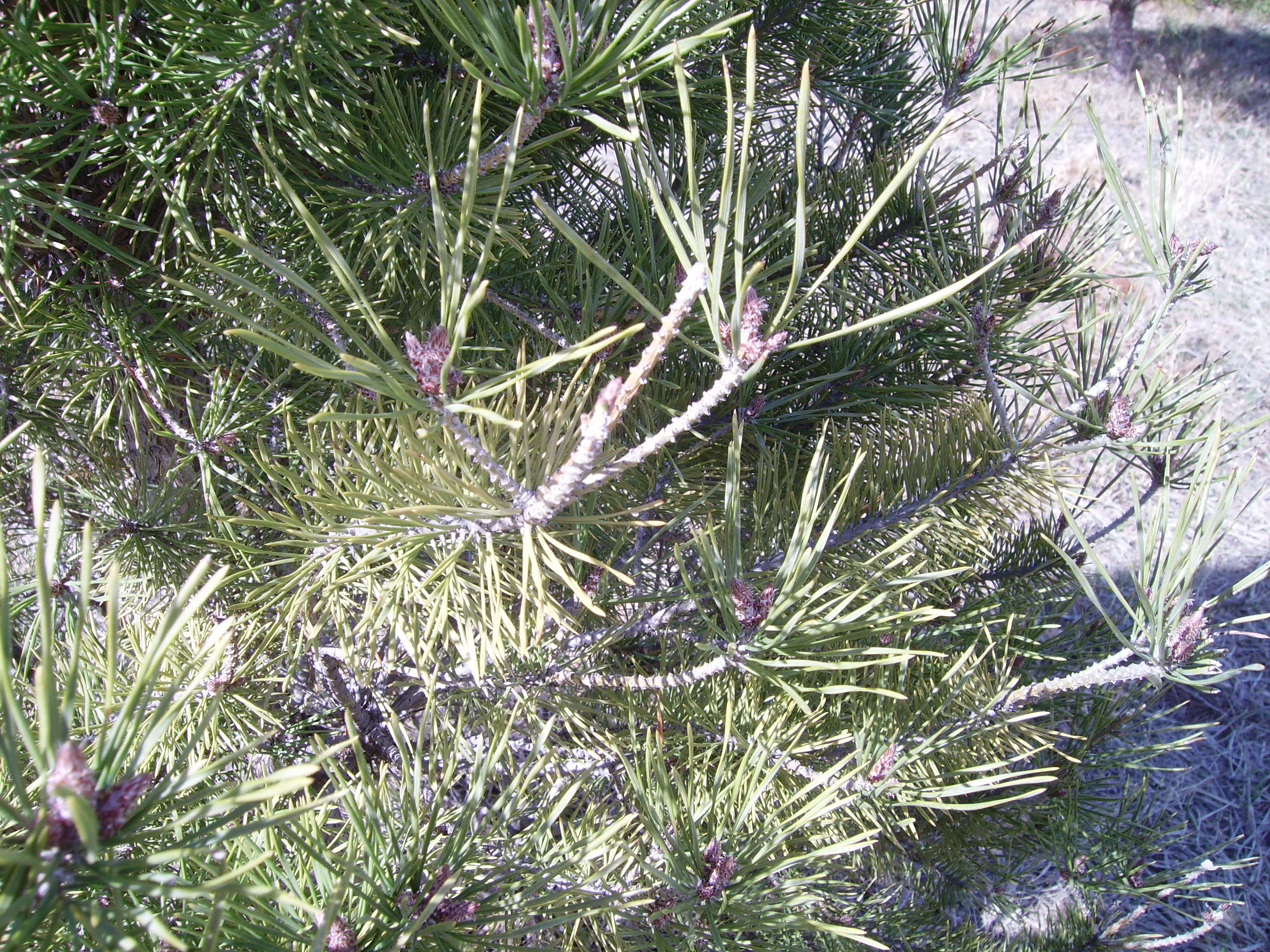
Damage from a European pine sawfly outbreak from the previous year. Growth on the edge of the branch came after the sawflies were killed. Second year growth is the first that gets eaten. Here, older growth survived due to pesticide use.

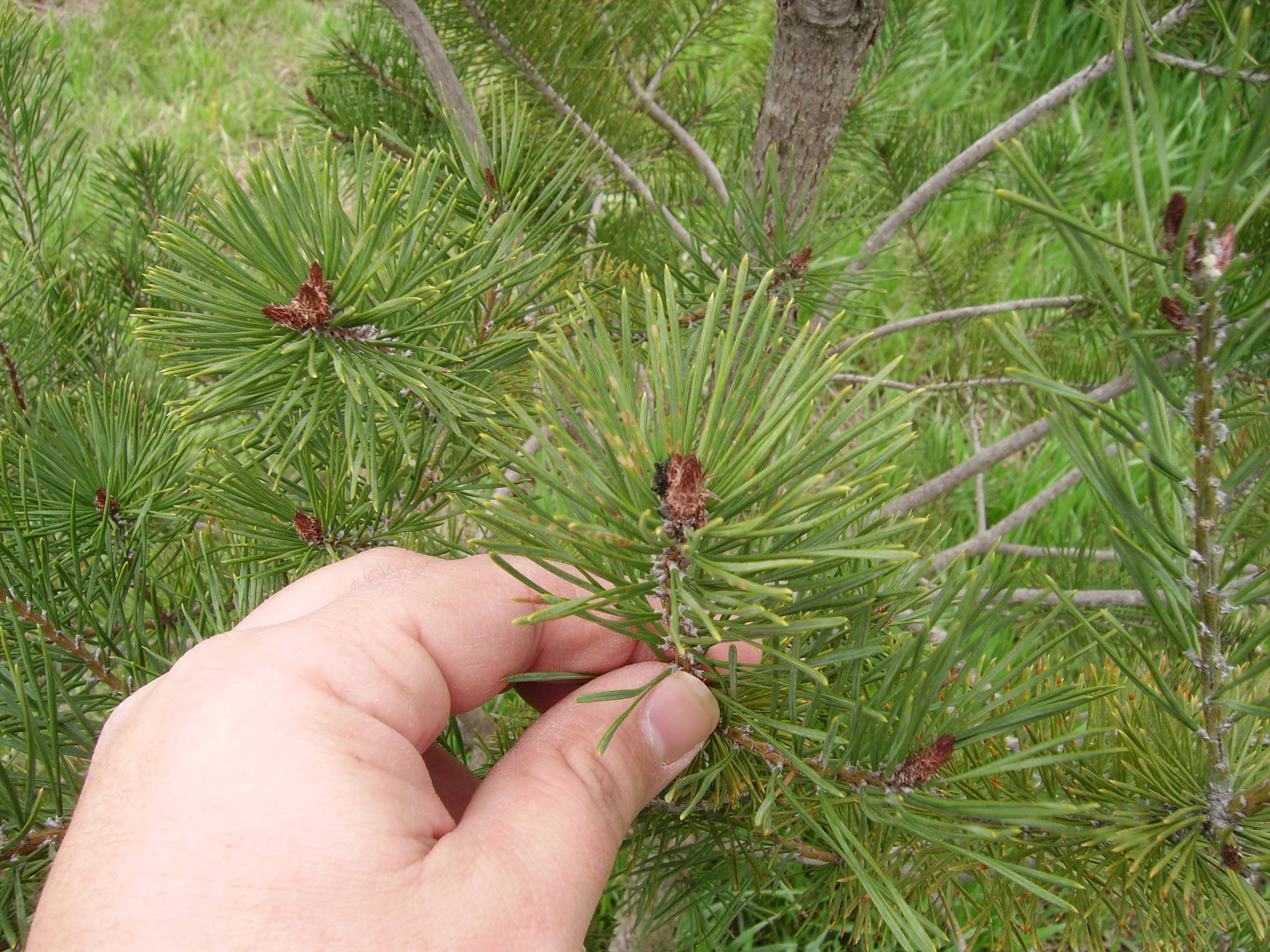
Recently hatched larvae. Brown bumps on pine needles are eggs. Tiny black spots near the bud are the sawflies.

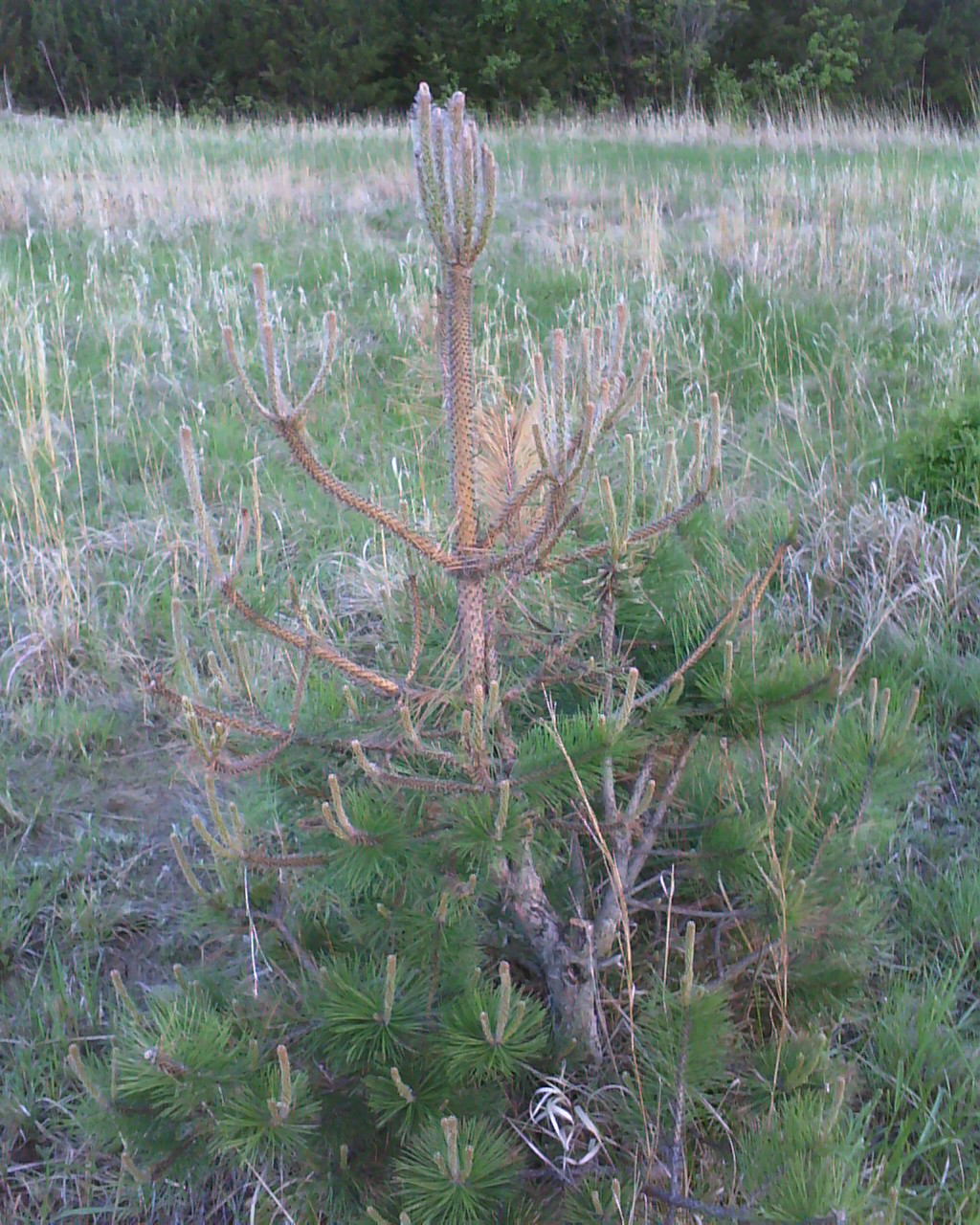
An Austrian pine partially eaten by sawflies.

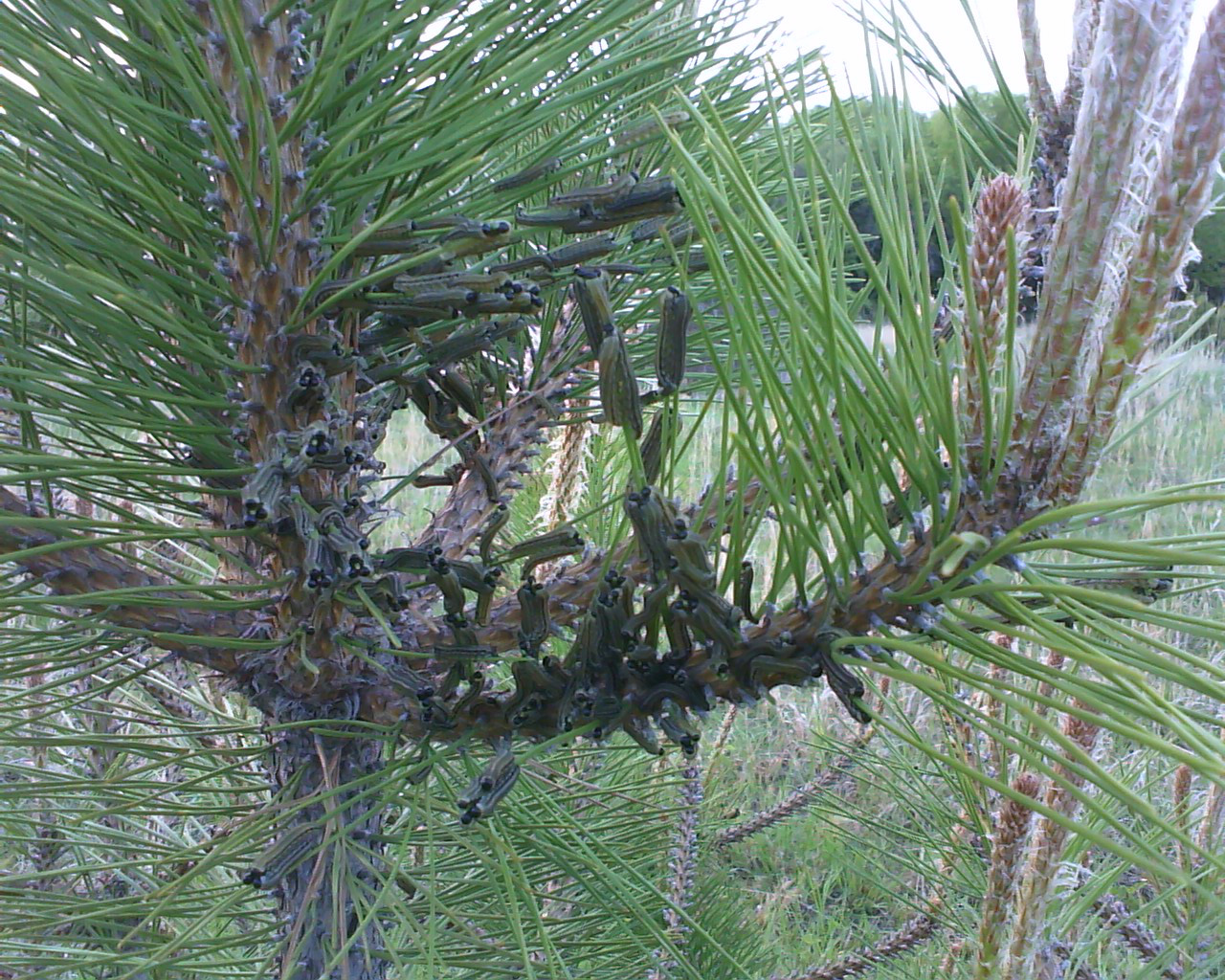
Cluster of European pine sawflies on Austrian pine. This picture was taken in mid-May, larvae about a month old.
