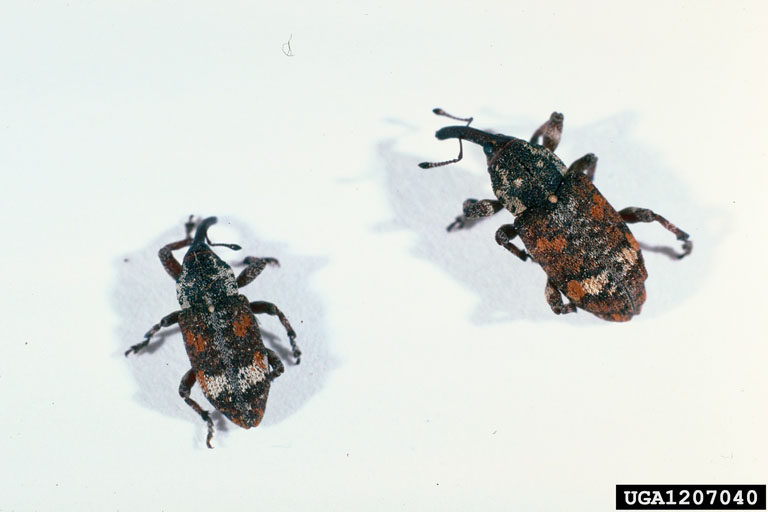
- Two adult Pissodes strobi

Scientific classification
- Kingdom: Animalia
- Phylum: Arthropoda
- Clade: Pancrustacea
- Class: Insecta
- Order: Coleoptera
- Suborder: Polyphaga
- Infraorder: Cucujiformia
- Superfamily: Curculionoidea
- Family: Curculionidae
- Genus: Pissodes
- Species: P. strobi

Binomial name
- Pissodes strobi W. D. Peck, 1817

= Pissodes strobi =

Species of beetle

Pissodes strobi, known as the white pine weevil or Engelmann spruce weevil, is the primary weevil attacking and destroying white pines. It was described in 1817 by William Dandridge Peck, professor of natural history and botany at Harvard University. The weevil is dark brown with white spots and is native to North America.

The eggs are laid inside a tree, usually white pine, Sitka spruce, white spruce, Engelmann spruce, or other pine or spruce, and the offspring feed on this tree until the host is killed. Terminals or shoots, as well as needles from pine or spruce, is what the diet of adult white pine weevils consists of.

== Distribution ==
White pine weevils, native to North America, can be found in a number of different tree species. More than 20 species of tree have the potential to be infested by white pine weevils, mainly affecting eastern white pines. Other species that can be affected include Colorado blue, Norway, and Serbian spruces, as well as Scots, red, pitch, jack, and Austrian pines.

== Diet ==
The diet of adult white pine weevils consists of the needles and shoots of both pine and spruce trees. Holes in the bark of a tree as a result of this feeding habit are evident as a white pine weevils will eat through the bark in order to reach the terminals. Feeding occurs in the spring, when white pine weevils emerge from overwintering.

== Behavior ==
White pine weevils will emerge in spring, waiting out the winter. This is the period in which females will lay their eggs in targeted trees. It takes until late summer for these larvae to become adults, and after winter passes in the following spring the next generation adult white pine weevils will reproduce and females will continue laying eggs in host trees. Storage of fertilized eggs through the winter season is an observed ability of female white pine weevils. Meaning that in following egg-laying seasons occurring in spring, female white pine weevils do not necessarily have to breed within that period.

== Damage to white spruce and white pine ==
Severe damage to white spruce and white pine can be created by the white pine weevil. Damage is caused due to reproduction of white pine weevils in host trees. When white pine weevils lay eggs they typically do so on the apical shoot. In around a week, or seven days, larvae will hatch from the eggs. The phloem of the shoot is what the larvae will feed on once they hatch. As a result of larvae feeding on the phloem, recent growth of the infected tree will begin to wilt or droop. Feeding can even cause death of recent growth.

Weevil resistance is a trait found in some trees and might be heritable. A study showed that the resin (sap) released from wounds in white spruce leaders (tips) susceptible to the white pine weevil showed a different terpenoid composition than wounds induced in resistant white pine leaders. (Tomlin et al. 2000). While certain trees may have resistance to an attack by white pine weevils, this does not mean they will not be attacked. This involves factors that aid in weevil resistance, and factors that could encourage white pine weevils to initiate an attack on more resistant trees, like food scarcity.

In coastal British Columbia, Sitka spruce trees developed a resistance against the white pine weevils which includes disruptions in egg & larvae development, deters host selection & mating, and delays the development of ovaries in female white pine weevils.
