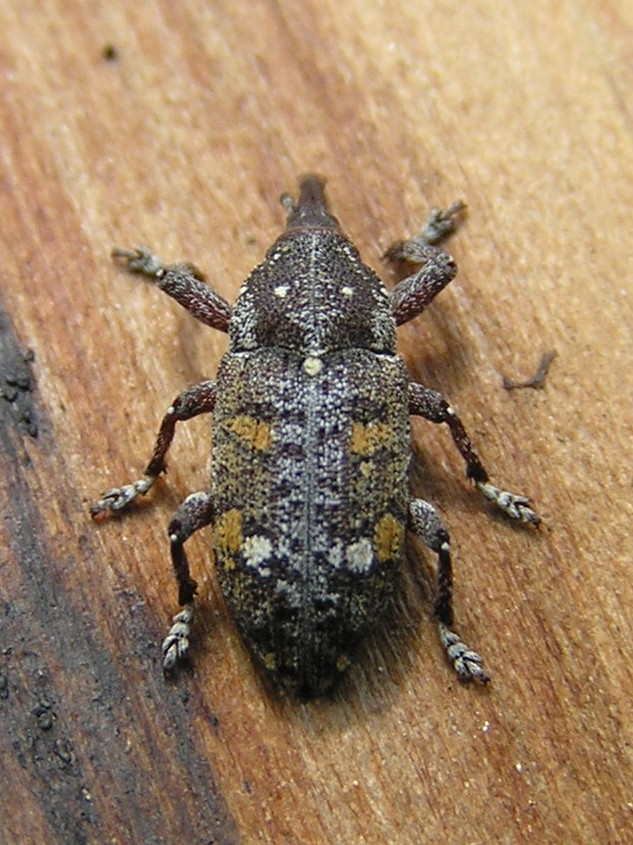
- Pissodes castaneus

Scientific classification
- Kingdom: Animalia
- Phylum: Arthropoda
- Clade: Pancrustacea
- Class: Insecta
- Order: Coleoptera
- Suborder: Polyphaga
- Infraorder: Cucujiformia
- Superfamily: Curculionoidea
- Family: Curculionidae
- Tribe: Pissodini
- Genus: Pissodes; Germar, 1817

Diversity
- at least 140 species

= Pissodes =

Genus of beetles

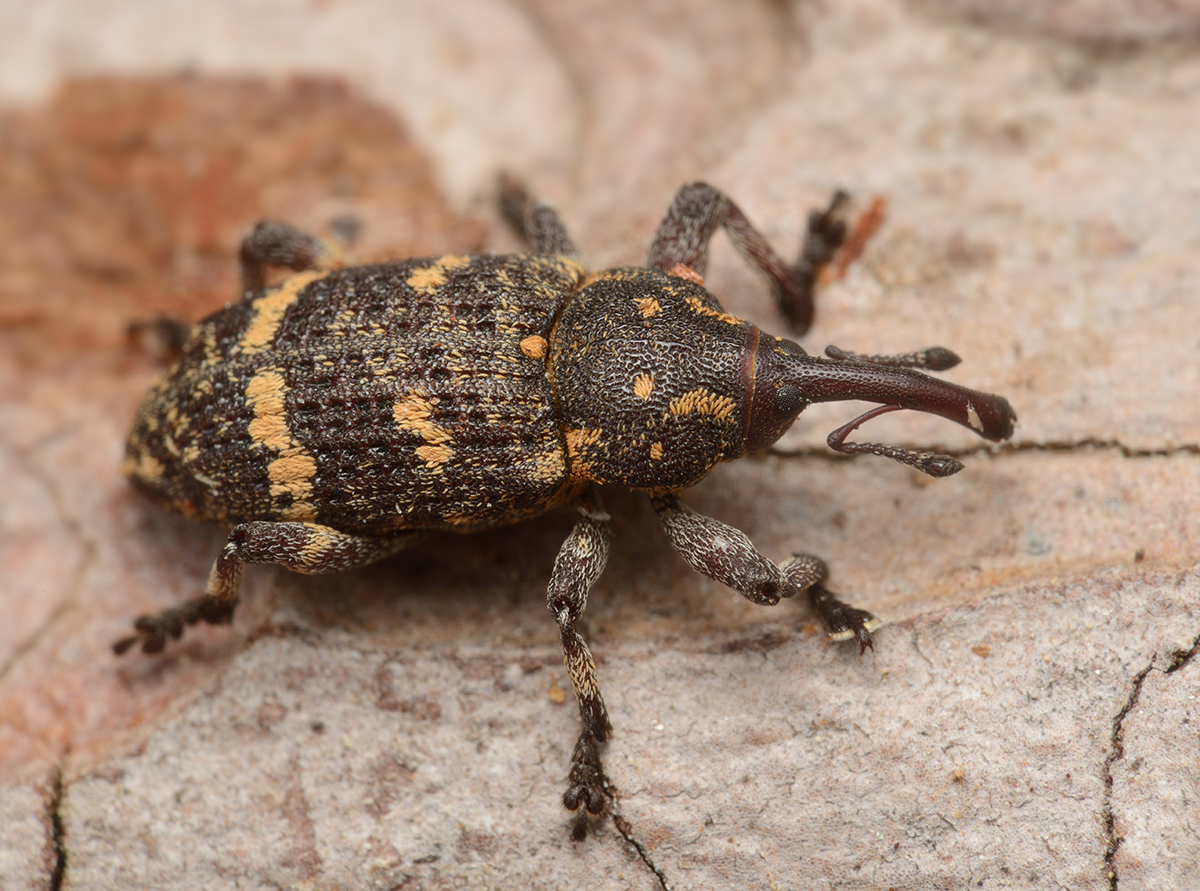
Pissodes pini

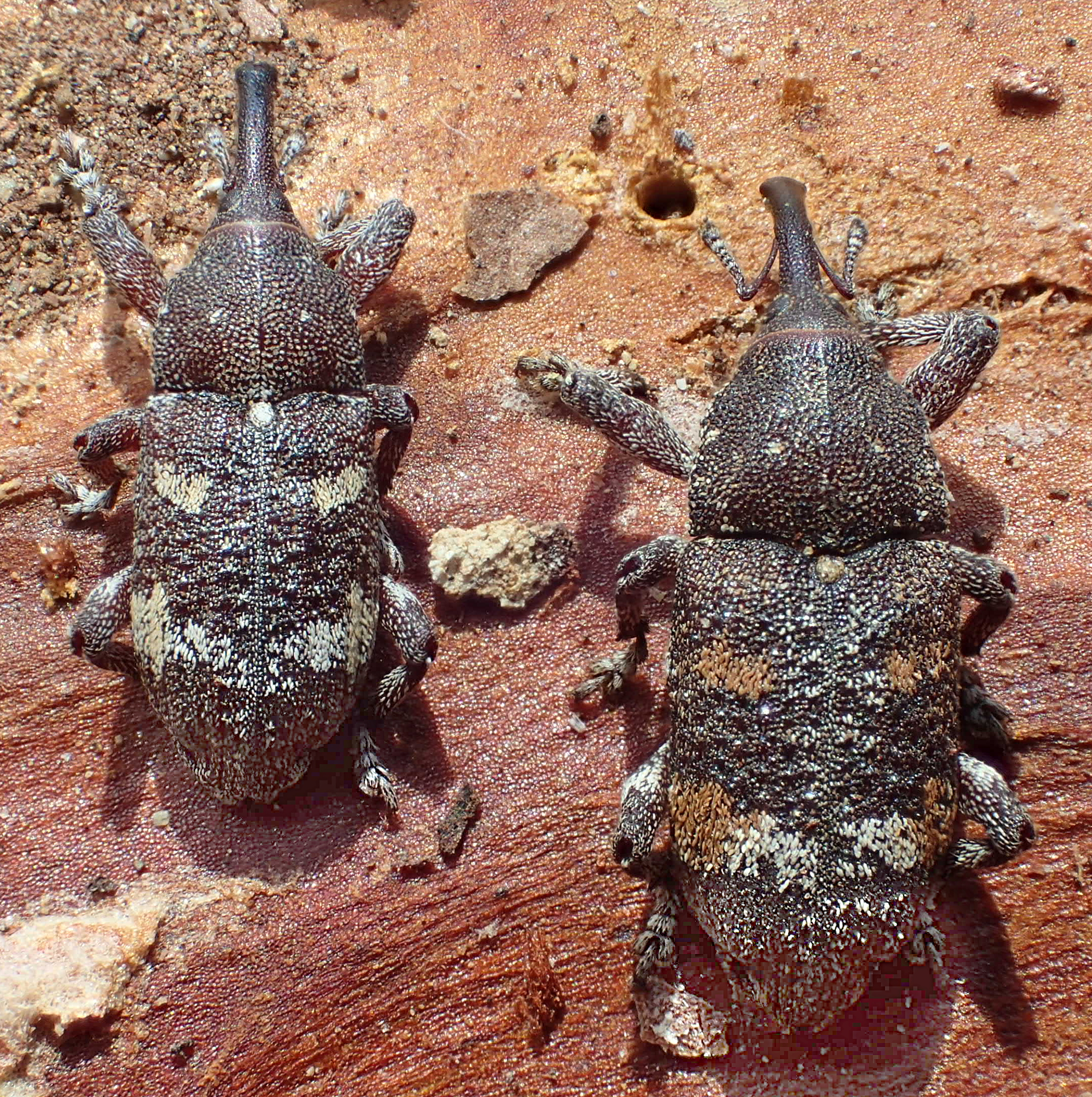
Pissodes castaneus

Pissodes is a genus of weevils described by Ernst Friedrich Germar in 1817.

These insects live on conifers. They are widely distributed in the Northern Hemisphere, their distribution mirroring that of plants in the Pinaceae, the pine family, which includes most of their host trees.

A few Pissodes species are considered to be pests, such as Pissodes strobi, P. nemorensis, and P. terminalis, because they do significant damage to trees.

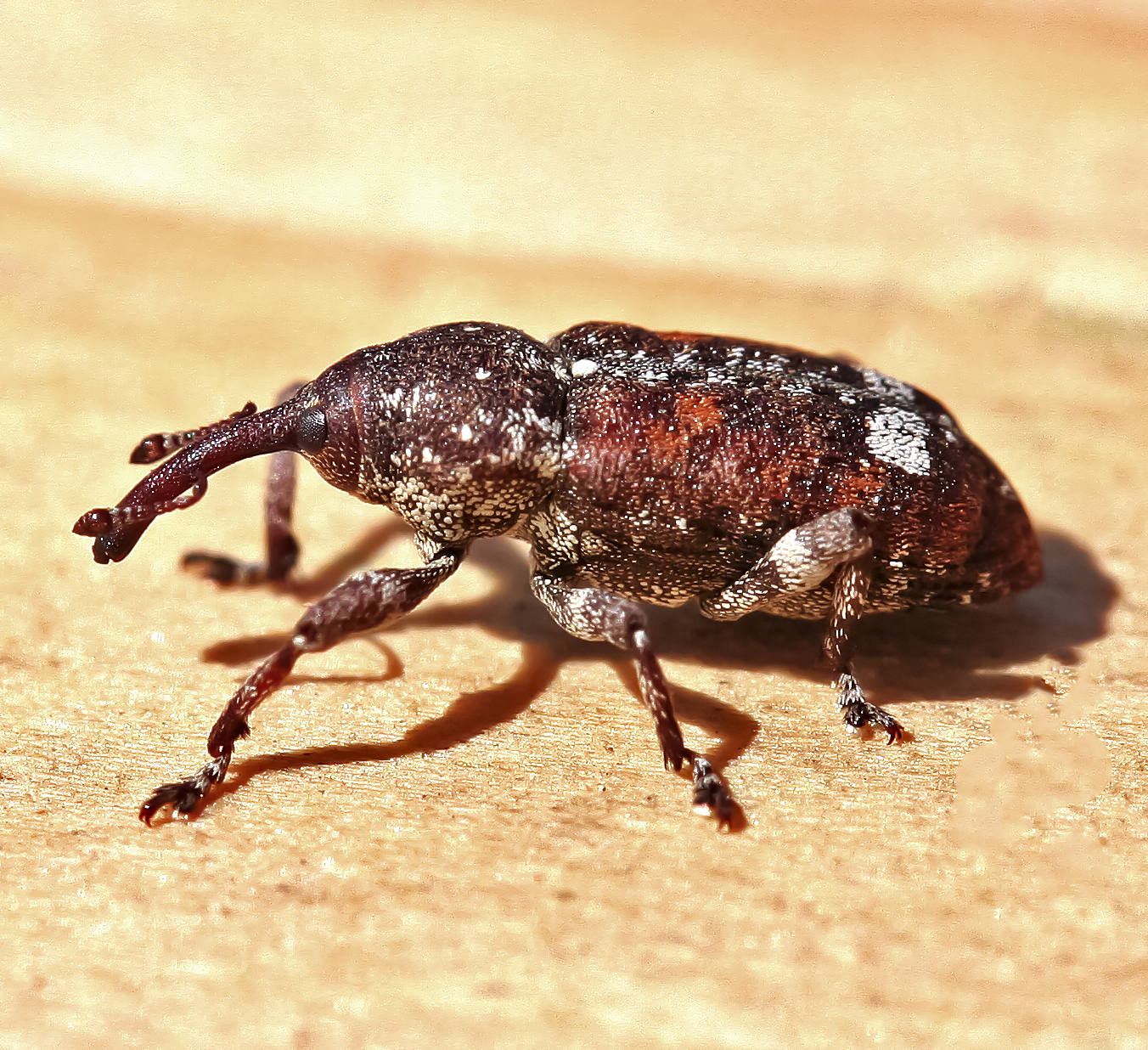
Pine weevil anterior view

There are at least 140 described species in Pissodes.

== See also ==
- List of Pissodes species
