= White pine sawfly =

White pine sawfly may refer to two pine sawfly species, whose larvae feed on the white pine:

- Diprion similis
- Neodiprion pinetum
