= Dahlbominus fuscipennis =

Scientific classification
- Kingdom: Animalia
- Phylum: Arthropoda
- Class: Insecta
- Order: Hymenoptera
- Family: Eulophidae
- Genus: Dahlbominus; Hincks, 1945
- Species: D. fuscipennis

Binomial name
- Dahlbominus fuscipennis (Zettersttedt, 1838)

Synonyms
- Entedon fuscipennis Zetterstedt, 1838; Eulophus fuscipennis (Zetterstedt, 1838); Ichneumon fuscipennis (Zetterstedt, 1838); Microplectron fuscipenne (Zetterstedt, 1838); Microplectron fuscipennis (Zetterstedt, 1838)

Species of wasp

Dahlbominus fuscipennis, the sawfly parasitic wasp, is a species of chalcid wasp from the family Eulophidae which parasitizes the European pine sawfly Neodiprion sertifer, among other hosts. It is the only species in the genus Dahlbominus.

== Description ==
Dahlbominus fuscipennis has a dark coloured, blue tinged head, thorax and body. The head is noticeably wider than the thorax and there is a triangular depression in the centre of the frons. The vertex is narrow and the large eyes are naked. The antennae sit in front of the clypeus and have spindle-like, compressed flagellae, those of the male are branching. The forewing shows shading and the legs are dark. The long, oval abdomen lacks a distinct waist. The females are 1.8-1.9mm in length and the males are 1.4-1.8mm.

== Biology ==
Dahlbominus fuscipennis has a number of generations in a year, in eastern Europe it normally has four generations but in cooler summers only three may occur and the last generation in August is usually the most numerous, although the generations overlap. The life cycle of this wasp is completed, under laboratory conditions, in 21–23 days. D. fuscipennis has a number of hosts, mainly sawflies of the family Diprionidae but it can also act as a hyperparasitoid on parasites of the eonymph of Ichneumonidae. In Canada only two full generations and a partial one are completed each summer with the wasps overwintering as fifth instar larvae, prepupae or pupae.

The adult females of D. fuscipennis mate soon after emergence and oviposit their white, oval eggs in groups of 10-50, the mean clutch being 30, through the cocoon and onto the cuticle of the prepupal stage of their host insects. The female first partially parasitizes the host using its sting. An adult female lives for around a week and she may lay up to 100 eggs during her adult life. They normally choose hosts where the prepupae are of the newer generation but will lay on diapausing prepupae of the previous host generation. The sex ratio is usually dominated by females and males may form only one-fifth of the total population. The females are diploid and are produced by fertilised eggs while the males are haploid and are produced from unfertilised eggs.

D. fuscipennis are poor fliers and search for their hosts by flying slowly through forested areas and find their prey cocoons on the surface layer of the soil and within the crowns of young trees with cocoons in the leaf litter having the highest rates of parasitism. The larvae hatch about 5 days after laying and go through five instars, each lasting a day or so, each differing in shape and morphology. The last instar becomes segmented, mainly yellow-brown in colour with a transparent anterior portion. It feeds on the host for four days before entering a prepupal stage which lasts two to three days. In Europe larval development lasts 11 days in the summer months. The pupal stage then lasts between seven and twelve days before the adults emerge. The entire brood of imagos emerge from the host's cocoon through a single emergence hole.

It has been recorded as being a parasitoid of Apanteles rubripes which is a parasitoid of the geometrid moth Semiothisa pumila and of the European spruce sawfly Gilpinia hercyniae. However, it is most associated with outbreaks of Neodiprion certifer and Diprion similis. In some areas this species is an important control on the populations of N. sertifer but in areas where both N. serifer and Neodiprion pini cocoons are numerous then the cocoons of the latter species are preferred. The wasps detect the hosts' prepupae by detecting volatile chemicals which diffuse through the prepupal integument and the cocoon. When the wasp detects these chemicals it drums its antennae, a sign that it has recognised a potential host.

== Distribution ==
Dahlbominus fuscipennis is native to Europe from France to western Siberia (Novosibirsk), north to Scandinavia and south to the Balkans. It has been introduced to North America in the United States and Canada.

== Naming ==
Dahlbominus fuscipennis was original named Eulophus fuscipennis by the Swedish naturalist Johan Wilhelm Zetterstedt in 1838, it was reclassified in a monotypic genus Dalbominus by Hincks in 1945. The name Dahlbominus honours the Swedish entomologist Anders Gustaf Dahlbom.

== Use as a Biological Control Organism ==
The Canadian Department of Agriculture started to import Dahlbominus fuscipennis from Europe in 1933 to be propagated in an insectary with several hundred million of the progeny being released since then in an attempt to control invasive European species of sawflies. Between 1935 and 139 the Canadian's exported a large number of the wasps to the United States where they were also released to control invasive sawflies as well as being bred at the Bureau of Entomology and Plant Quarantine, the Maine Forest Service and the New Jersey Department of Agriculture. The first US release was in Maine in 1935 and consisted of 30,000 adult wasps and by the end of 1939 over 200 million wasps had been liberated in Maine. The species is now established in north-eastern North America.
