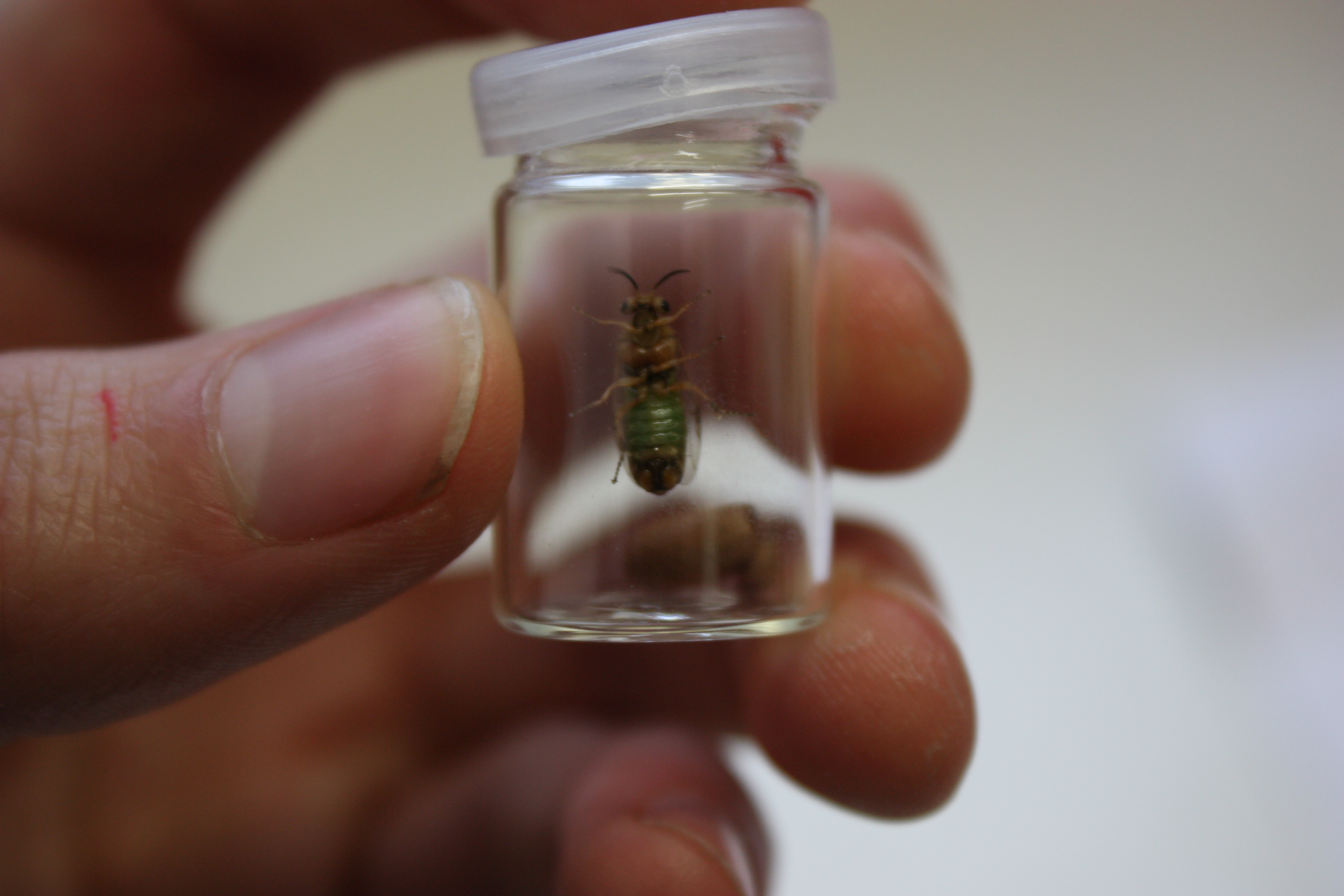
- Gilpinia pallida female

Scientific classification
- Domain: Eukaryota
- Kingdom: Animalia
- Phylum: Arthropoda
- Class: Insecta
- Order: Hymenoptera
- Suborder: Symphyta
- Family: Diprionidae
- Genus: Gilpinia
- Species: G. pallida

Binomial name
- Gilpinia pallida Klug, 1812

= Gilpinia pallida =

Species of sawfly

Gilpinia pallida is one of several species known as the pine sawfly. Outbreaks, which can cause considerable damage to pine forests, have been recorded in northern, central, and eastern Europe. During these events, G. pallida may co-occur with other pine sawflies, notably Diprion pini.
