= Macrodiprion =

Scientific classification
- Domain: Eukaryota
- Kingdom: Animalia
- Phylum: Arthropoda
- Class: Insecta
- Order: Hymenoptera
- Suborder: Symphyta
- Family: Diprionidae
- Genus: Macrodiprion; Enslin, 1914

Genus of sawflies

Macrodiprion is a genus of sawflies belonging to the family Diprionidae.

The species of this genus are found in Europe.

Species:

- Macrodiprion nemoralis (Enslin, 1917
