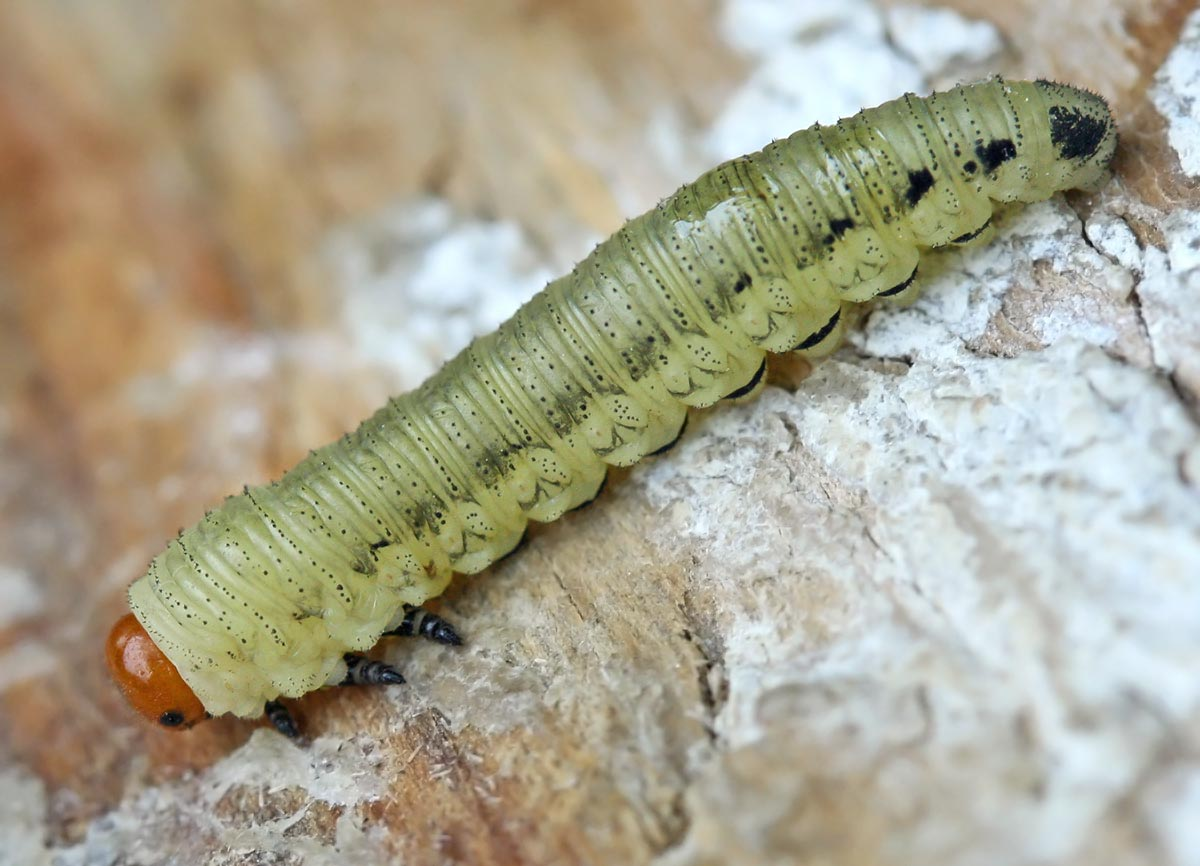
- Diprion pini larva

Scientific classification
- Domain: Eukaryota
- Kingdom: Animalia
- Phylum: Arthropoda
- Class: Insecta
- Order: Hymenoptera
- Suborder: Symphyta
- Family: Diprionidae
- Genus: Diprion; Schrank, 1802

= Diprion =

Genus of sawflies

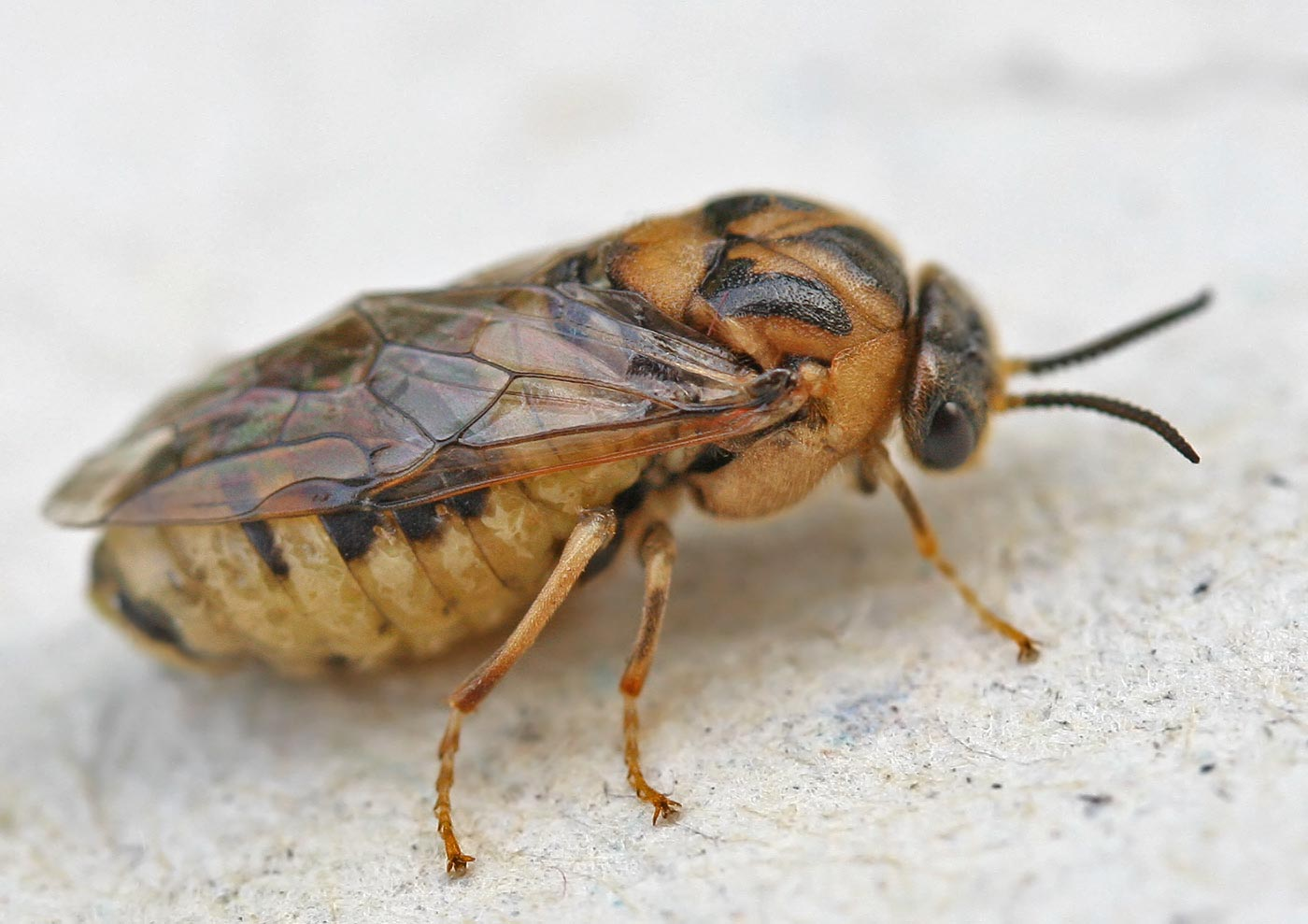
Diprion pini

Diprion is a genus of conifer sawflies in the family Diprionidae. There are at least 12 described species in Diprion.

== Species ==
These species belong to the genus Diprion:

- Diprion hani D.R. Smith & Cho, 2008 – South Korea
- Diprion hutacharernae D.R. Smith, 1979 – Oriental region
- Diprion jingyuanensis G.R. Xiao & Y. Zhang, 1994 – China
- Diprion kashmirensis M.S. Saini & Thind, 1993 – India
- Diprion koreanus Takagi, 1931 – Japan, Korea, Russia
- Diprion liuwanensis X. Huang & G.R. Xiao, 1983 – China
- Diprion nanhuaensis G.R. Xiao, 1983 – China
- Diprion nipponicus Rohwer, 1910 (black-spotted pine sawfly) – Japan
- Diprion pini Linnaeus, 1758 (pine sawfly) – Palaearctic
- Diprion similis (Hartig, 1834) (introduced pine sawfly) Palaearctic, Nearctic
- Diprion tianmunicus Zhou & X. Huang, 1983 – China
- Diprion wenshanicus G.R. Xiao & Zhou, 1983 – China
