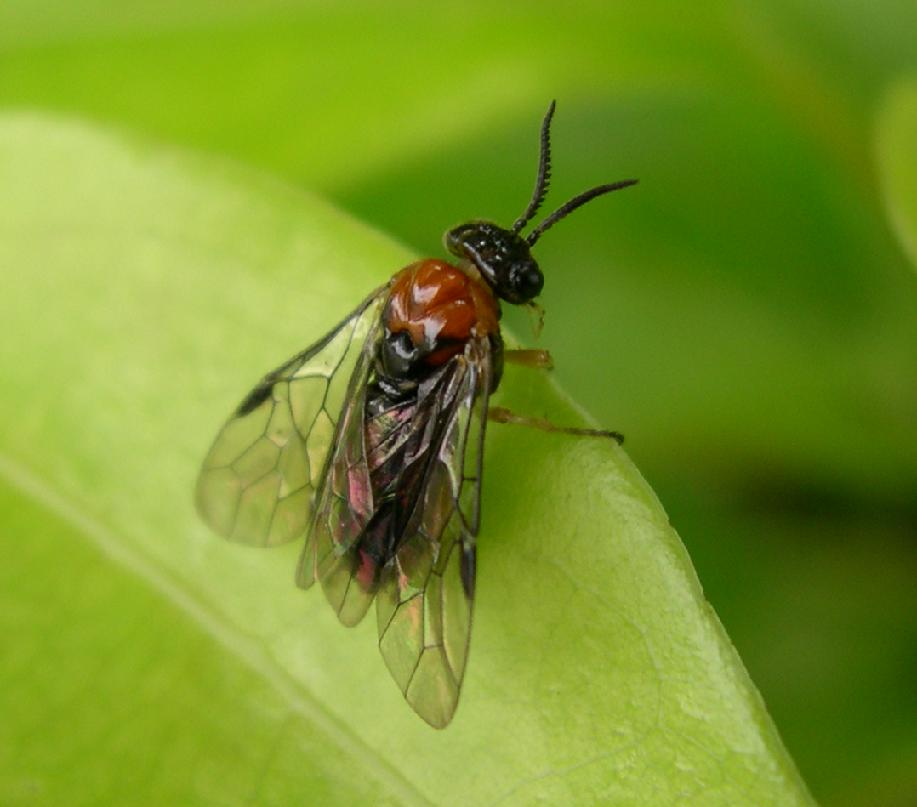

Scientific classification
- Kingdom: Animalia
- Phylum: Arthropoda
- Class: Insecta
- Order: Hymenoptera
- Suborder: Symphyta
- Family: Diprionidae
- Genus: Monoctenus; Dahlbom, 1835

= Monoctenus =

Genus of sawflies

Monoctenus is a genus of sawflies belonging to the family Diprionidae.

The species of this genus are found in Europe and North America.

Species:

- Monoctenus juniperi (Linnaeus, 1758)
- Monoctenus obscuratus (Hartig, 1837)
