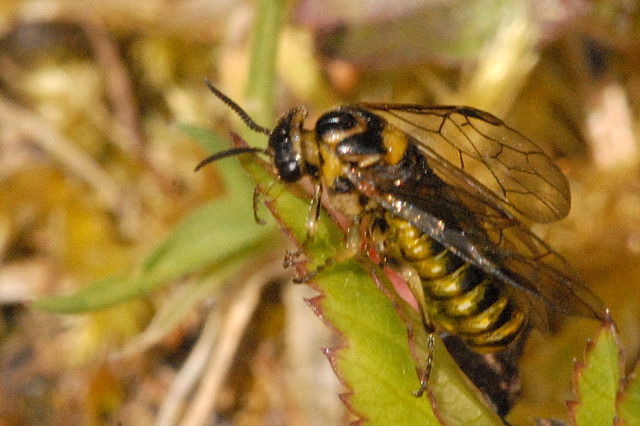
- Gilpinia polytoma

Scientific classification
- Domain: Eukaryota
- Kingdom: Animalia
- Phylum: Arthropoda
- Class: Insecta
- Order: Hymenoptera
- Suborder: Symphyta
- Family: Diprionidae
- Genus: Gilpinia; Benson, 1939

= Gilpinia =

Genus of sawflies

Gilpinia is a genus of sawflies belonging to the family Diprionidae.

The species of this genus are found in Europe and North America.

Species:

- Gilpinia abieticola (Dalla Torre, 1894)
- Gilpinia catocala (Snellen van Vollenhoven, 1858)
- Gilpinia coreana Takagi, 1931
- Gilpinia excisa Gussakovskij, 1947
- Gilpinia fennica (Forsius, 1911)
- Gilpinia frutetorum (Fabricius, 1793)
- Gilpinia hercyniae (Hartig, 1837)
- Gilpinia hokkaidoensis Hara & Shinohara, 2015
- Gilpinia kojimai Hara & Shinohara, 2015
- Gilpinia laricis (Jurine, 1807)
- Gilpinia lishui Li, Wang & Wei, 2022
- Gilpinia pallida (Klug, 1812)
- Gilpinia polytoma (Hartig, 1834)
- Gilpinia socia (Klug, 1812)
- Gilpinia variegata (Hartig, 1834)
- Gilpinia virens (Klug, 1812)
- Gilpinia wui Wang & Wei, 2019
