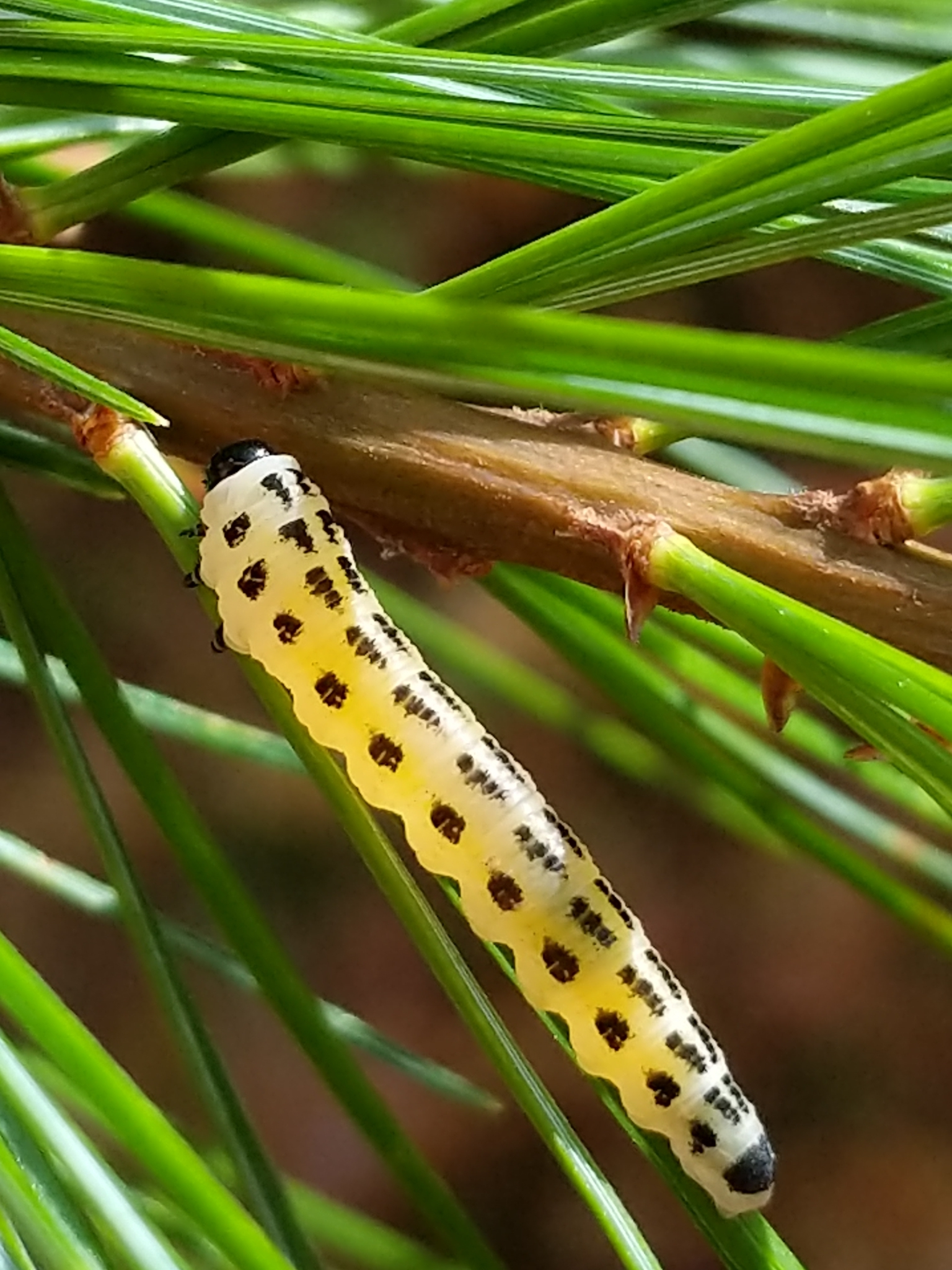
- Larva

Scientific classification
- Kingdom: Animalia
- Phylum: Arthropoda
- Clade: Pancrustacea
- Class: Insecta
- Order: Hymenoptera
- Suborder: Symphyta
- Family: Diprionidae
- Genus: Neodiprion
- Species: N. pinetum

Binomial name
- Neodiprion pinetum (Norton, 1869)

= Neodiprion pinetum =

Species of sawfly

Neodiprion pinetum is a species of sawfly in the family Diprionidae. It is commonly known as the white pine sawfly, a name sometimes also applied to Diprion similis, because the larvae of both species feed on the needles of the white pine (Pinus strobus).

== Description ==
The adult N. pinetum is a broad-bodied insect with membranous wings. Females have a saw-like ovipositor at the tip of the abdomen and are larger than males. The larvae have black heads and are creamy-coloured or yellowish, with four longitudinal rows of black spots.

== Distribution ==
Neodiprion pinetum is native to North America, its range extending through the eastern United States to southeastern Canada.

== Hosts ==
The main host for the larvae of this species is the white pine (Pinus strobus), but it also occurs on the pitch pine (Pinus rigida), short-leaf pine (Pinus echinata), the red pine (Pinus resinosa) and the Swiss mountain pine (Pinus mugo).

== Ecology ==
The adult sawflies appear in late spring. The female uses its ovipositor to cut a slit along the edge of a pine needle and lays several eggs in this. If mating has occurred, both male and female offspring develop, but unmated females can also lay viable eggs, and these result in entirely male offspring. Each female lays about one hundred eggs over the course of a few months. The first instar larvae are gregarious and consume the surface layer of the needles but later instars spread out through the foliage and consume the whole needle. They feed on both old and young pine needles; heavy infestations can seriously defoliate the tree and isolated clumps of white pine can be killed. When the larvae are fully developed, they descend to the ground where they make cocoons among the leaf litter; in these they overwinter as non-feeding prepupae, pupating in the spring and emerging as adults a few weeks later.

Several parasitic wasps attack the larvae of this sawfly, and the egg parasitoid Closterocerus cinctipennis was found to be 90% effective in controlling an outbreak of the pest in Crawford County, Wisconsin.
