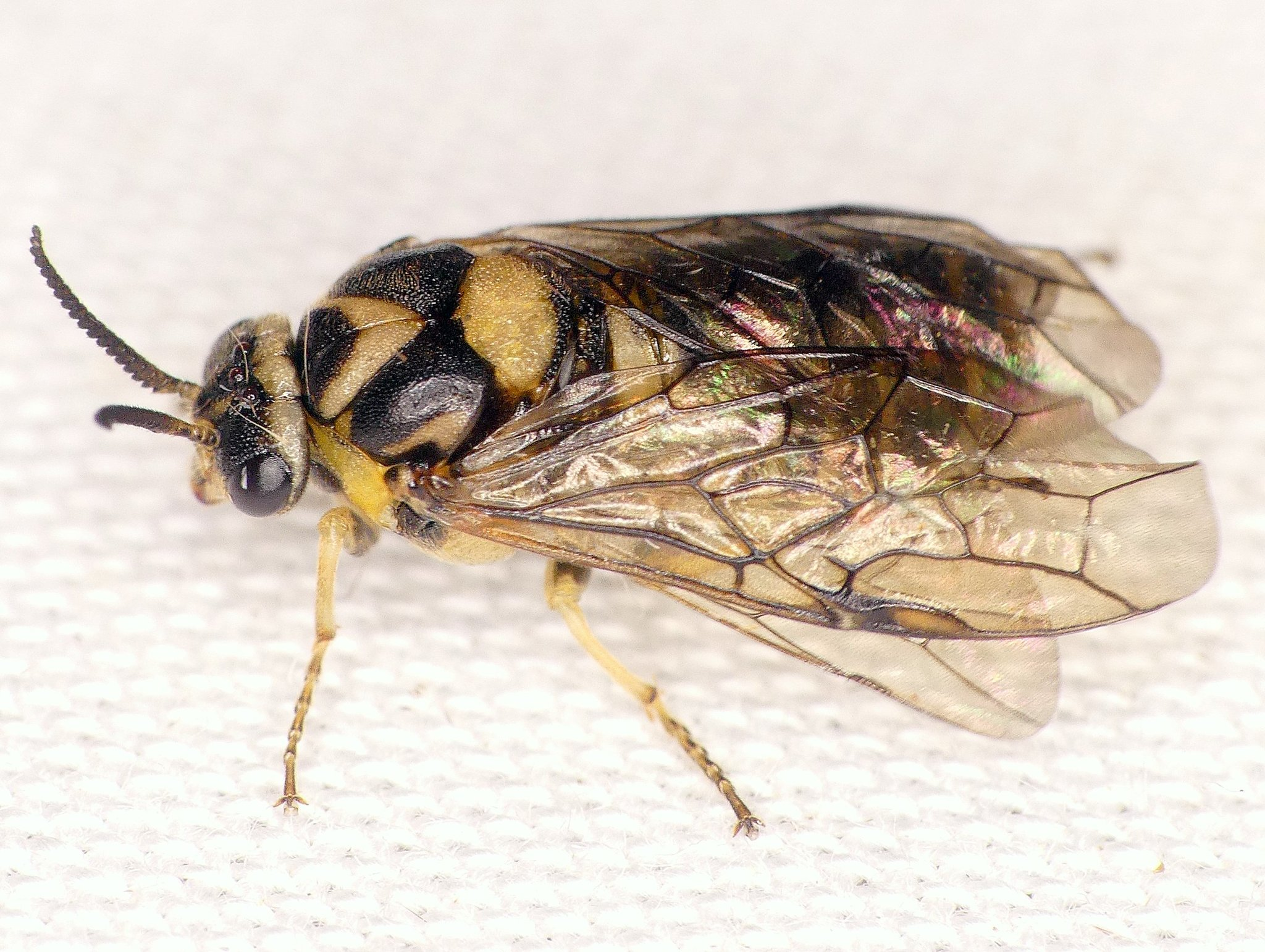

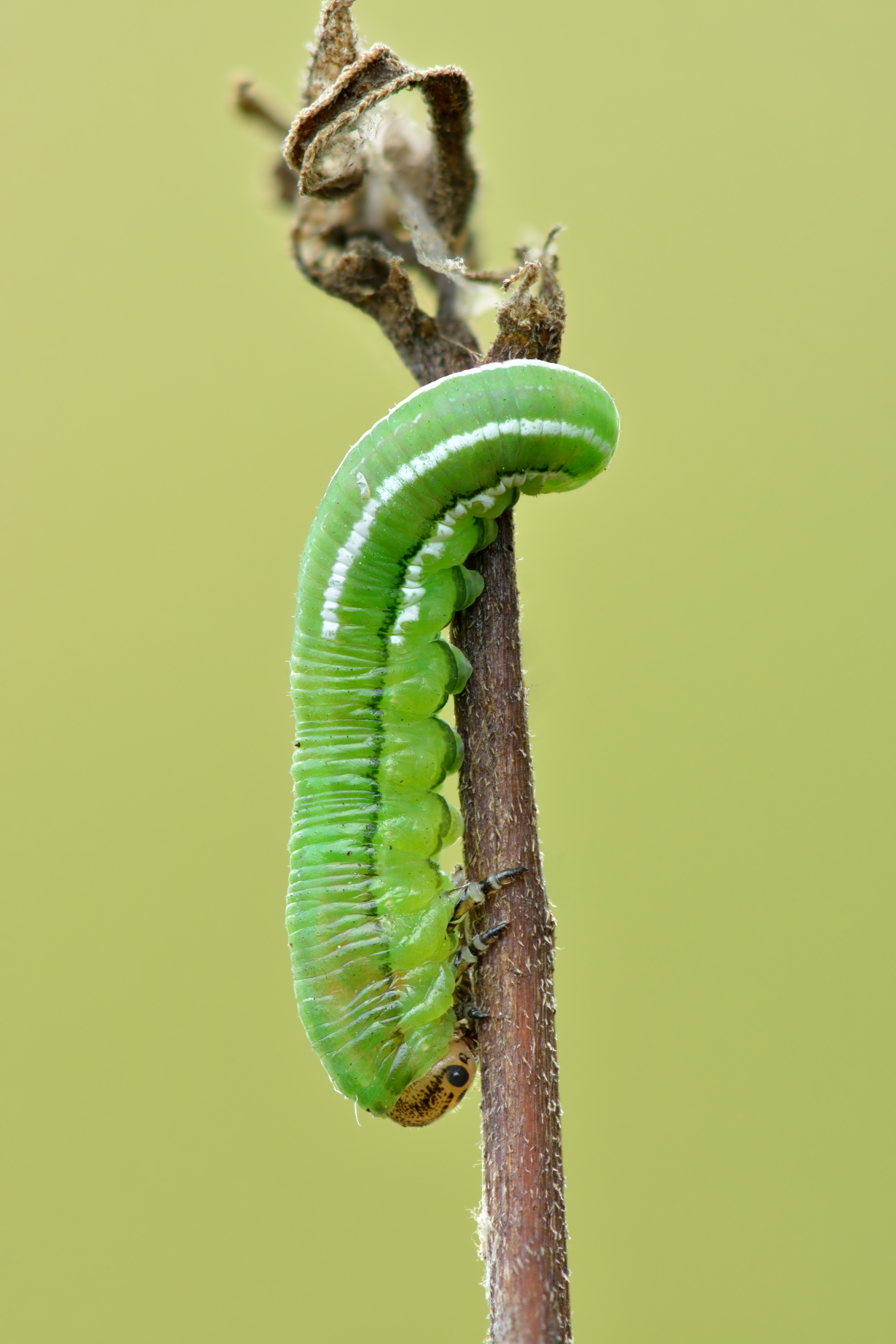
- Adult (top) and larvae (bottom)

Scientific classification
- Domain: Eukaryota
- Kingdom: Animalia
- Phylum: Arthropoda
- Class: Insecta
- Order: Hymenoptera
- Suborder: Symphyta
- Family: Diprionidae
- Genus: Gilpinia
- Species: G. hercyniae

Binomial name
- Gilpinia hercyniae Hartig

Synonyms
- Diprion hercyniae

= Gilpinia hercyniae =

European spruce sawfly

Species of sawfly

Gilpinia hercyniae, the European spruce sawfly, was first found in North America near Hull, Quebec, in 1922 (Rose and Lindquist 1985). By 1930, severe damage was occurring in spruce stands in the Lower St. Lawrence–Gaspé region of Quebec. Population levels exploded, and further damage subsequently occurred in New Brunswick and the northeastern United States (Balch 1936a, b, 1937; Blais 1961). Loss of wood from spruce mortality was estimated at 10 million cubic metres (Rose and Lindquist 1985), but by the mid-1980s pest numbers on all species of spruce in Canada from Manitoba to the Atlantic Ocean and in adjacent parts of the United States had become relatively low under the influence of spontaneous virus disease and introduced parasites. In Newfoundland, control was helped by the introduction of the masked shrew, a cocoon-hunting insectivore.

This sawfly has 1 or 2 generations per year. In Ontario, the larvae overwinter in cocoons in the litter layer and change into pupae in the spring. The adults emerge soon thereafter. Males are very rare, and reproduction usually takes place without fertilization. The females lay their eggs in slits cut in the needles. Upon hatching, the larvae feed on the older needles in June and July. Full-grown larvae (about 20 mm long) drop to the ground and spin cocoons. The adults emerge within a month and lay their eggs, the (second-generation) larvae from which feed from mid-August through September.
