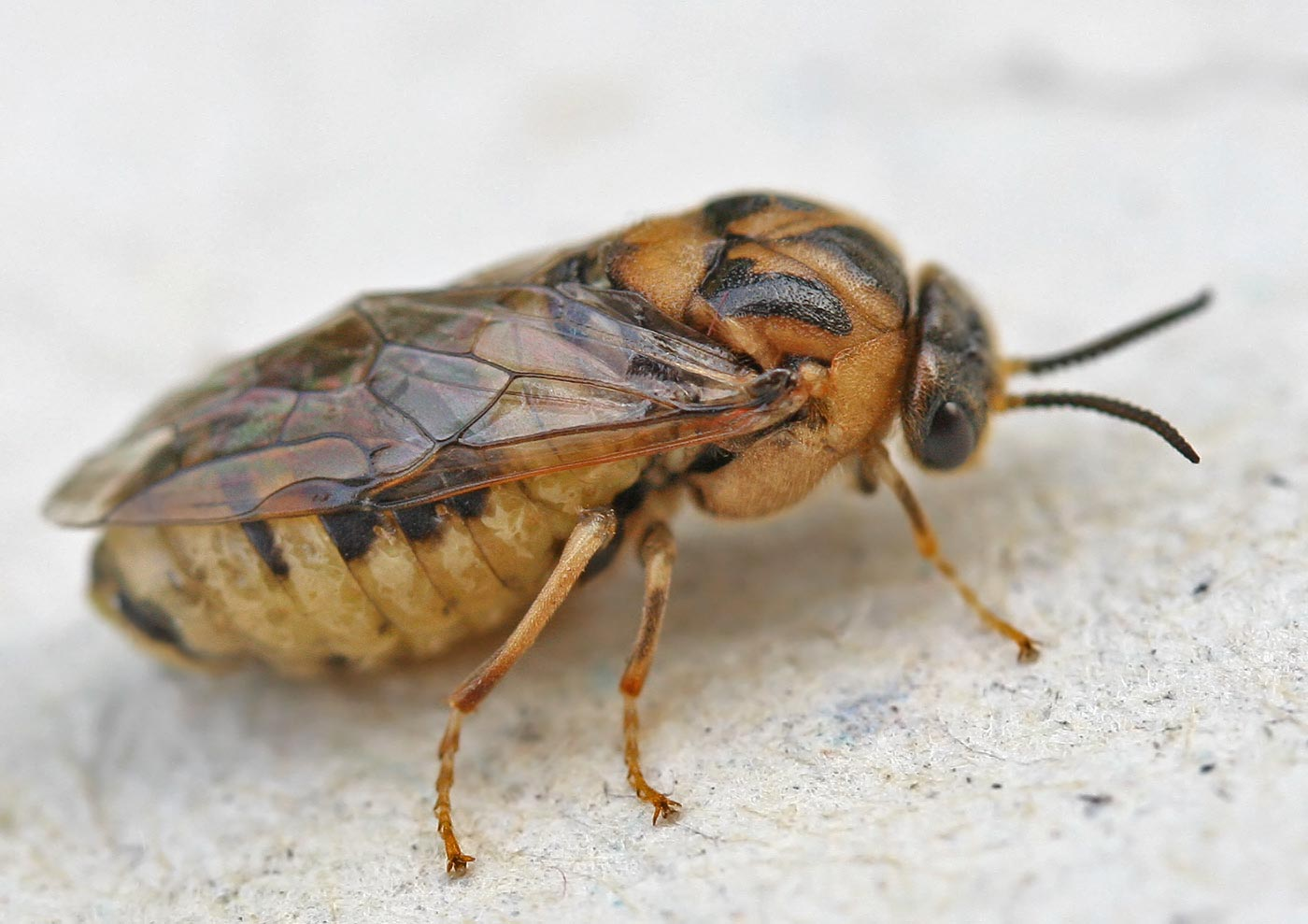
- Female

Scientific classification
- Kingdom: Animalia
- Phylum: Arthropoda
- Clade: Pancrustacea
- Class: Insecta
- Order: Hymenoptera
- Suborder: Symphyta
- Family: Diprionidae
- Genus: Diprion
- Species: D. pini

Binomial name
- Diprion pini (Linnaeus, 1758)

Synonyms
- Tenthredo pini Linnaeus, 1758; Diprion dorsatum Fabricius, 1781; Tenthredo eques Schrank, 1782; Tenthredo pectinata Retzius, 1783; Lophyrus pini Latreille, 1802; Tenthredo pinet Bechstein & Scharfenberg, 1805; Hylotoma nemorum Fallén, 1807; Pteronus pini Jurine, 1807; Diprion butovitschi Hedqvist, 1967

= Common pine sawfly =

Species of sawfly

The common pine sawfly, Diprion pini, is a sawfly species in the family Diprionidae. The adult male is dark brown or black with comb-like antennae; the female is striped black and yellow. The female lays some 100–150 eggs on pine needles. The caterpillars are yellow-green, gregarious, and feed on pine needles. The next generation of adults can emerge from pupae the same year, or the pupae can go into diapause for a year or more. The species is widespread throughout Europe and Russia.

The insect is a serious pest of economic forestry, capable of defoliating large areas of pine forest. The Scots pine, Pinus sylvestris, is the main host but other pine species are also attacked. Since the species grazes until late autumn, weakened trees often die in winter. Control involves aerial spraying of insecticides, or biological control with parasitoid wasps. The species was first described by Carl Linnaeus.

== Description ==
The adult (imago) is 7–10 millimetres (0.28–0.39 in) long. The body is arched, with 26-segment antennae. The species is sexually dimorphic. The male is slightly smaller than the female, and has different coloration. Males are black-brown or black, with pectinate (comb-like) antennae. Females are pale yellow with dark markings, are more heavily built, and have saw-shaped antennae and a saw-shaped ovipositor (egg-laying tube). The adults do not feed, and live for just a few days. Males are haploid, females diploid (2N=28 chromosomes).

The eggs are about 1.4 millimetres (0.055 in) long, and are elongated and kidney-shaped.

The caterpillar larvae are pale yellow or yellow-green, with a brown head. There is a line along the 7 pairs of abdominal prolegs. The true legs are dark. Last-stage larvae can be up to 25 millimetres (0.98 in) long; the head is brown, while the body is light green with black spots.

The pupae broadly resemble the adults. Each pupa is housed in a cocoon 8–12 millimetres (0.31–0.47 in) long, which is yellow-brown.

== Life history ==
The species is an insect with complete metamorphosis, changing from a caterpillar larva via a pupal stage to a winged adult. There can be one or two generations in a year. In the far north, as in the north of Russia, adults appear in June–July. Further south, adults emerge in April–May and again in July–August, so it is possible to have larvae and adults at the same time. Females attract males with a sex pheromone; its main component is athreo-3,7-dimethyl-2-tridecanol.

Eggs are laid in rows in springtime, with 3–20 eggs in a group over around 10 pine needles, in grooves cut by the female on pine needles from the previous year. Eggs laid in summer can be on either old or new needles. A female can lay some 100–150 eggs. The eggs take 14–21 days to hatch.

Young caterpillars start feeding on the old pine needles near where they hatched, leaving the vascular bundles uneaten. Older caterpillars feed more widely, moving to other branches and eating whole needles except for the leaf sheath; late in the season they also consume the current year's needles. The young caterpillars are gregarious, living in groups of some 60 to 100 individuals. In sufficient numbers, they can defoliate entire trees.

The pupa is attached to a pine twig, crack in the tree's bark, or nearby plants. Adults can emerge after 2–3 weeks, but the pupae can go into diapause, overwintering, or staying in diapause for over a year. Diapause is more likely, and the sex ratio (of males to females) increases, among inbred populations.

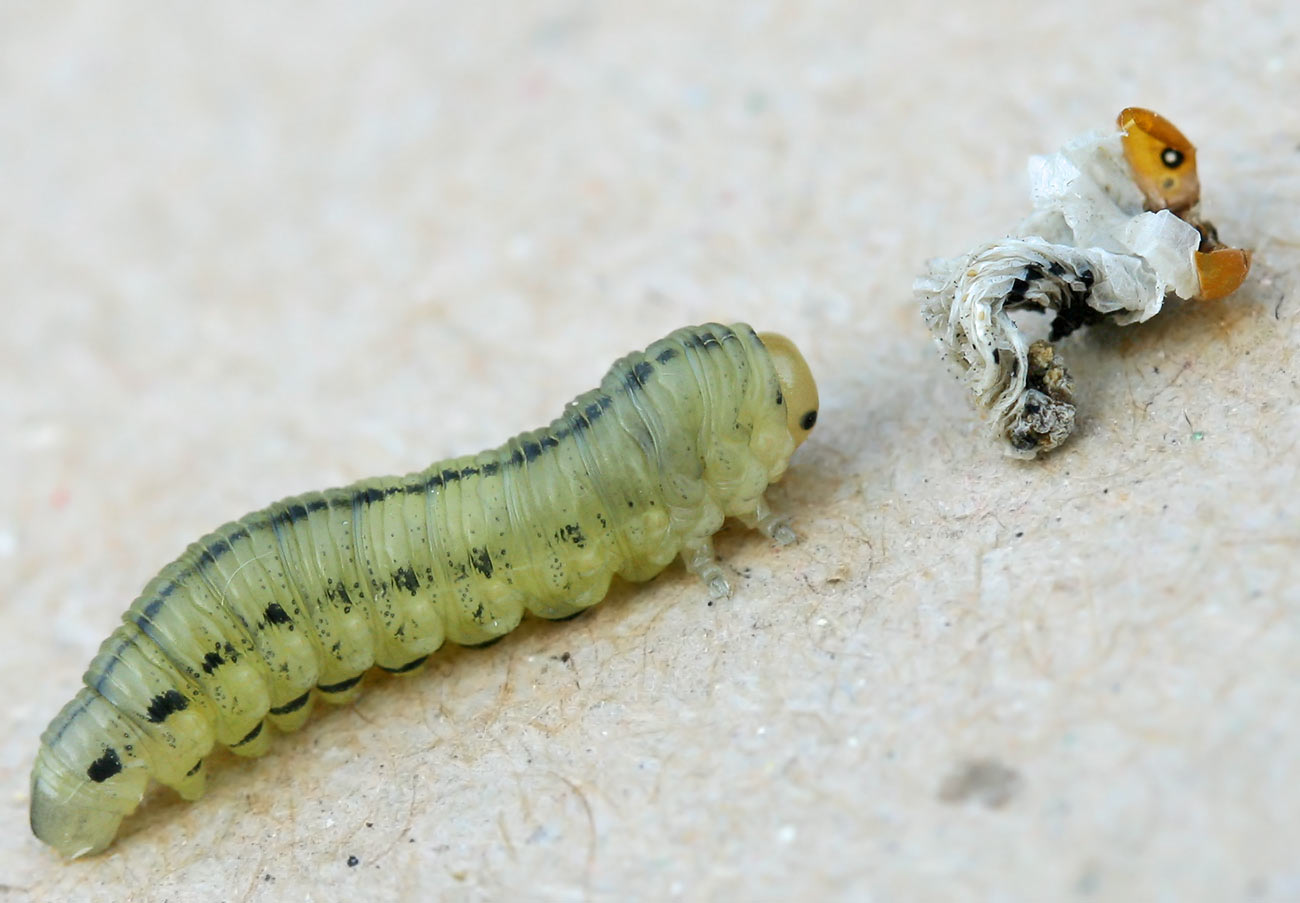
Last instar larva with exuviae

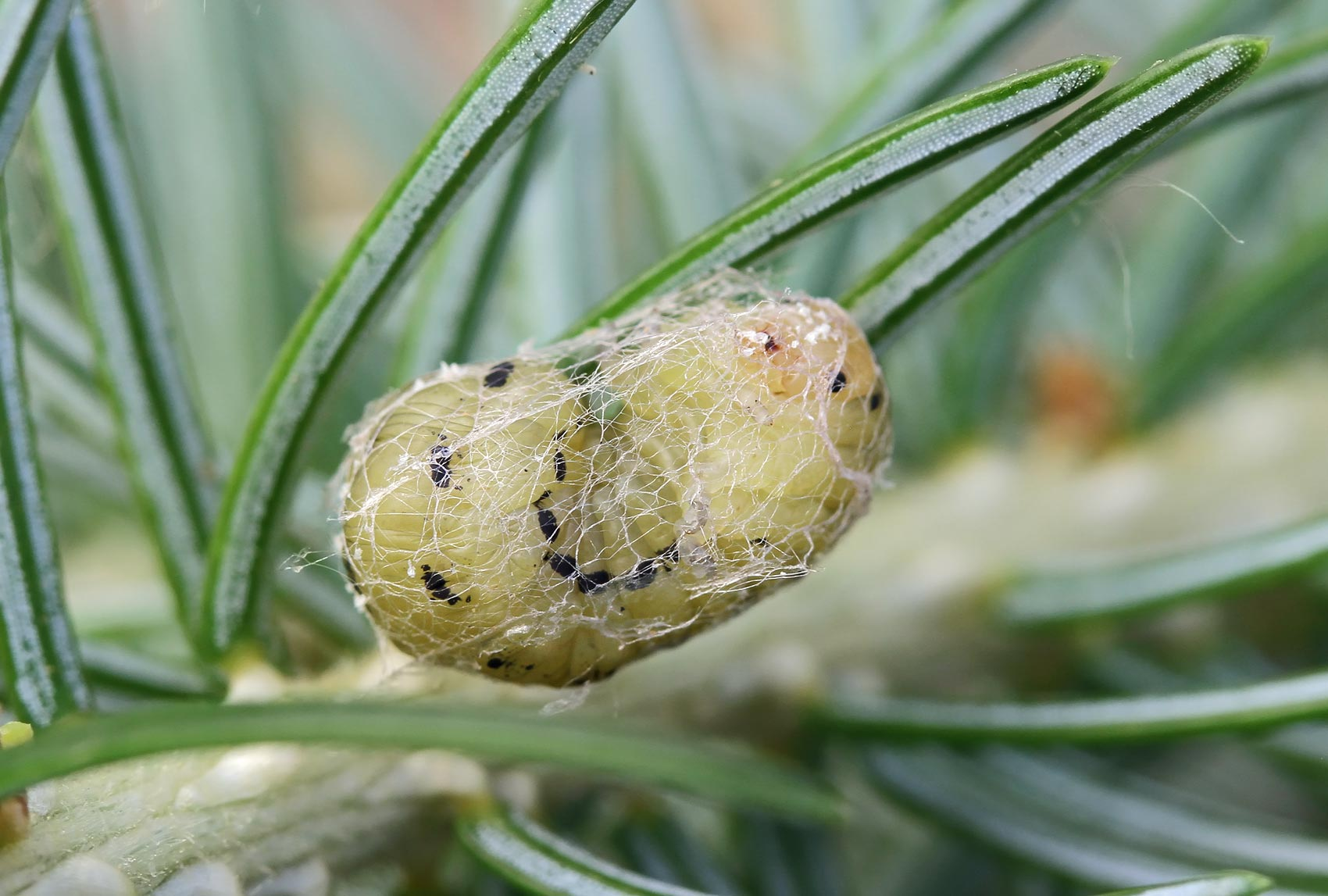
Larva forming pupa in pine tree

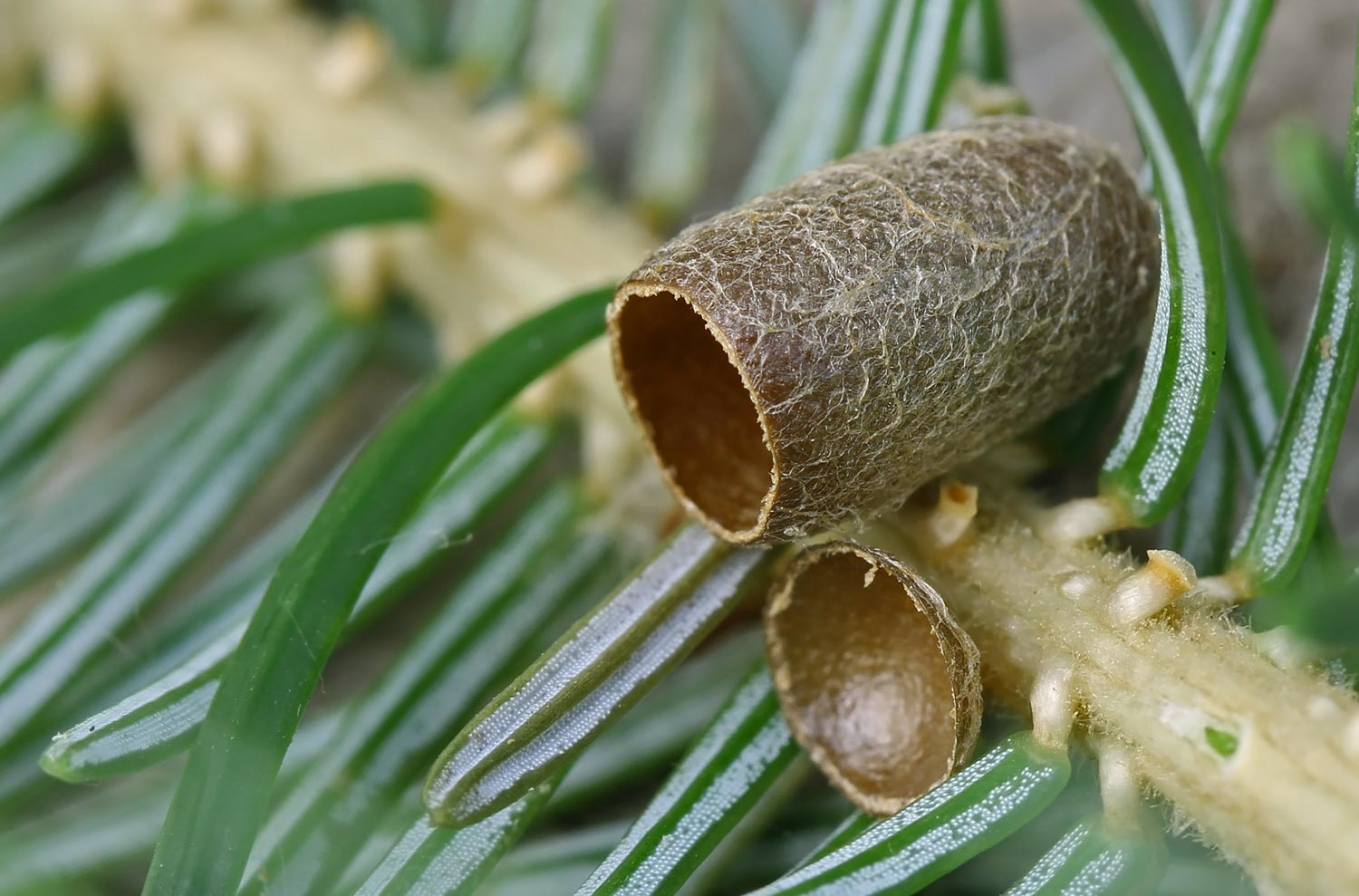
Opened cocoon

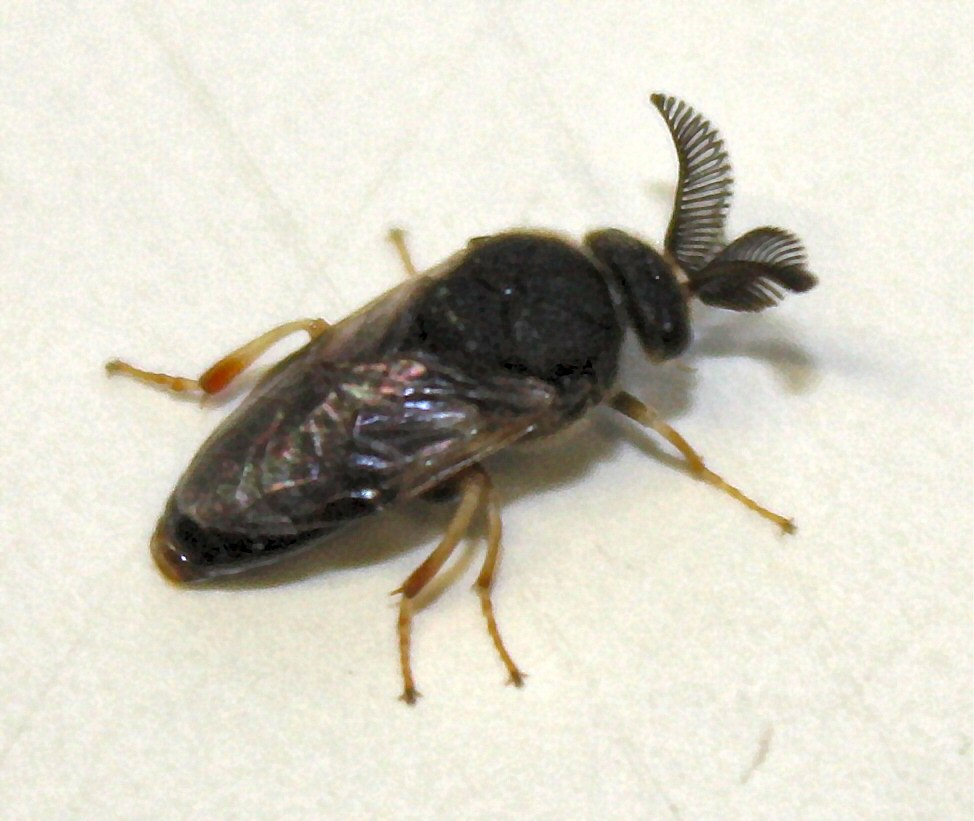
Male imago

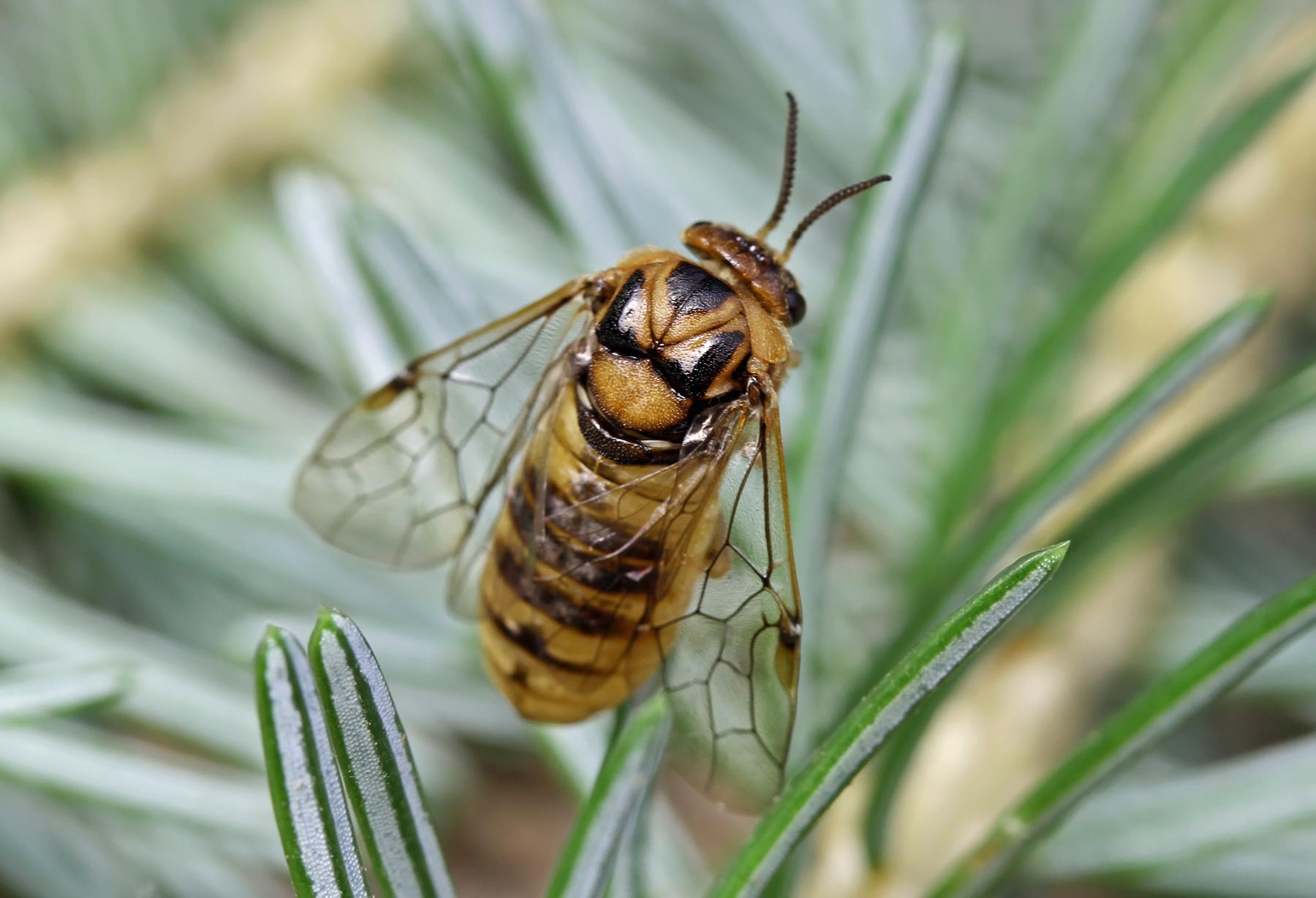
Female imago

== Taxonomy ==
The species was first described as Tenthredo pini by Carl Linnaeus in 1758. In 1781, Johan Christian Fabricius described it as Tenthredo dorsata; in 1782, Franz von Paula Schrank called it Tenthredo eques; in 1783, the Swedish chemist Anders Jahan Retzius called it Tenthredo pectinata major; in 1802, Pierre André Latreille placed it in the genus Lophyrus; in 1805, the German naturalists Johann Matthäus Bechstein and Georg Ludwig Scharfenberg called it Tenthredo pineti; and in 1807, the Swedish botanist and entomologist Carl Fredrik Fallén created the synonym Hylotoma nemorum. In 1916, the German entomologist Eduard Enslin moved the species to the genus Diprion as D. pini, describing varieties D. pini var klugi, D. pini var nigristernis, and D. pini var nigroscutellatum. In 1967, the Swedish entomologist Karl-Johan Hedqvist described the synonym D. butovitschi.

== Distribution and ecology ==
The species is widely distributed across Europe and Russia, and is present in Algeria, Siberia, and Turkey. Climate and pine species including the Scots pine are suitable for the pest across much of the United States, so the species is a potential threat there. Most (84%) of the genetic variation is within populations, but there is some reproductive isolation of upland populations, implying reduced altitudinal gene flow.

The pine sawfly's host plants are species of pine including Pinus banksiana (jack pine), P. cembra (arolla pine), P. contorta (lodgepole pine), P. mugo (mountain pine), P. nigra (black pine), P. pinaster (maritime pine), P. radiata (radiata pine), P. strobus (eastern white pine), P. sylvestris (Scots pine), P. uncinata (mountain pine), and P. wallichiana (blue pine). Feeding experiments on ten pine species show large variations in food suitability, heavily affecting larval growth and mortality; the Scots pine is the best food, while the maritime pine is the worst.

The species is not a vector of plant pathogens, but sawfly damage can weaken pine trees, making them more likely to suffer secondary attacks such as from the pine shoot beetle Tomicus piniperda.

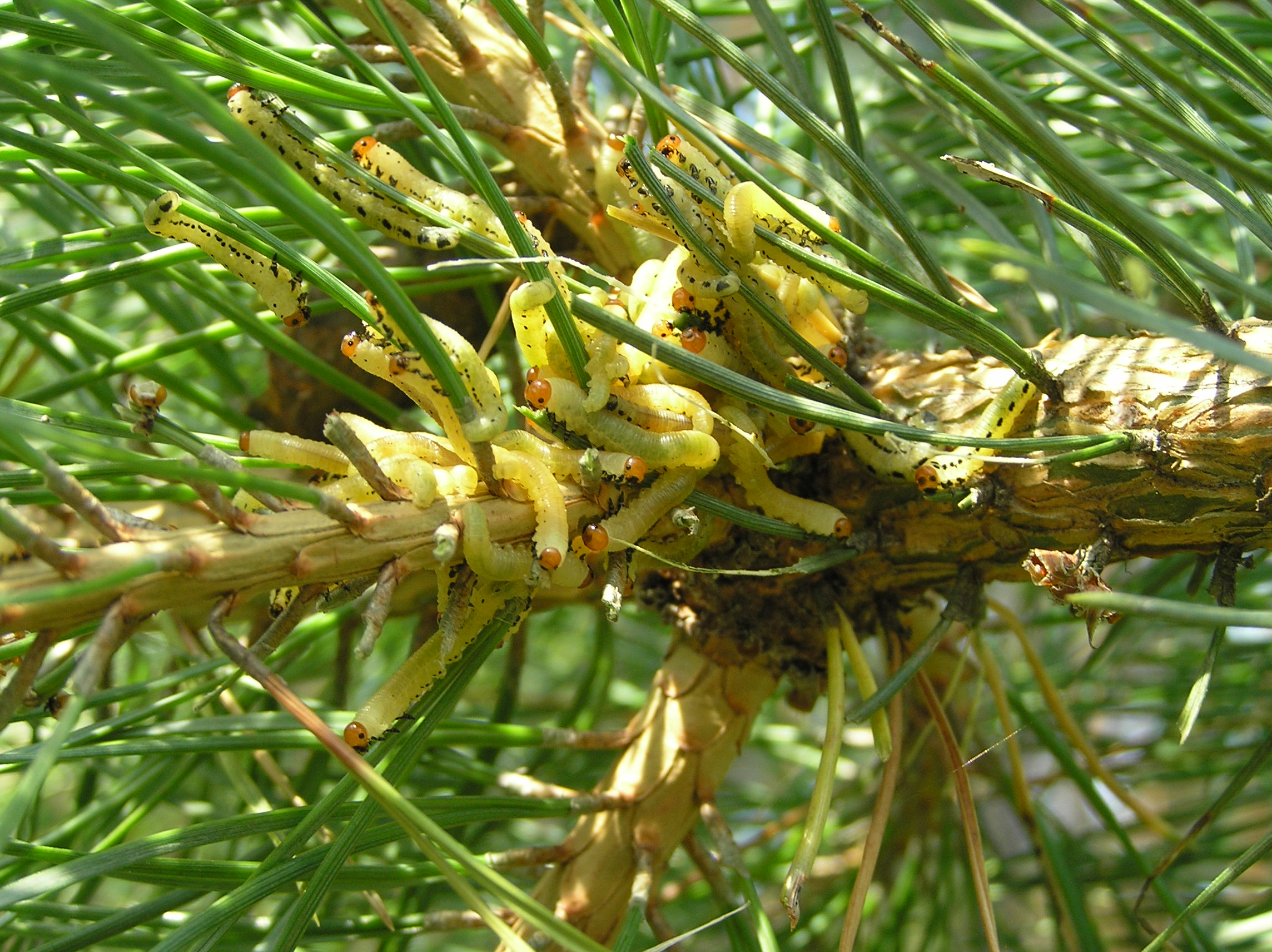
Mass of larvae on pine tree

Deimatic behaviour: group of larvae waving their heads simultaneously

== Forestry pest ==
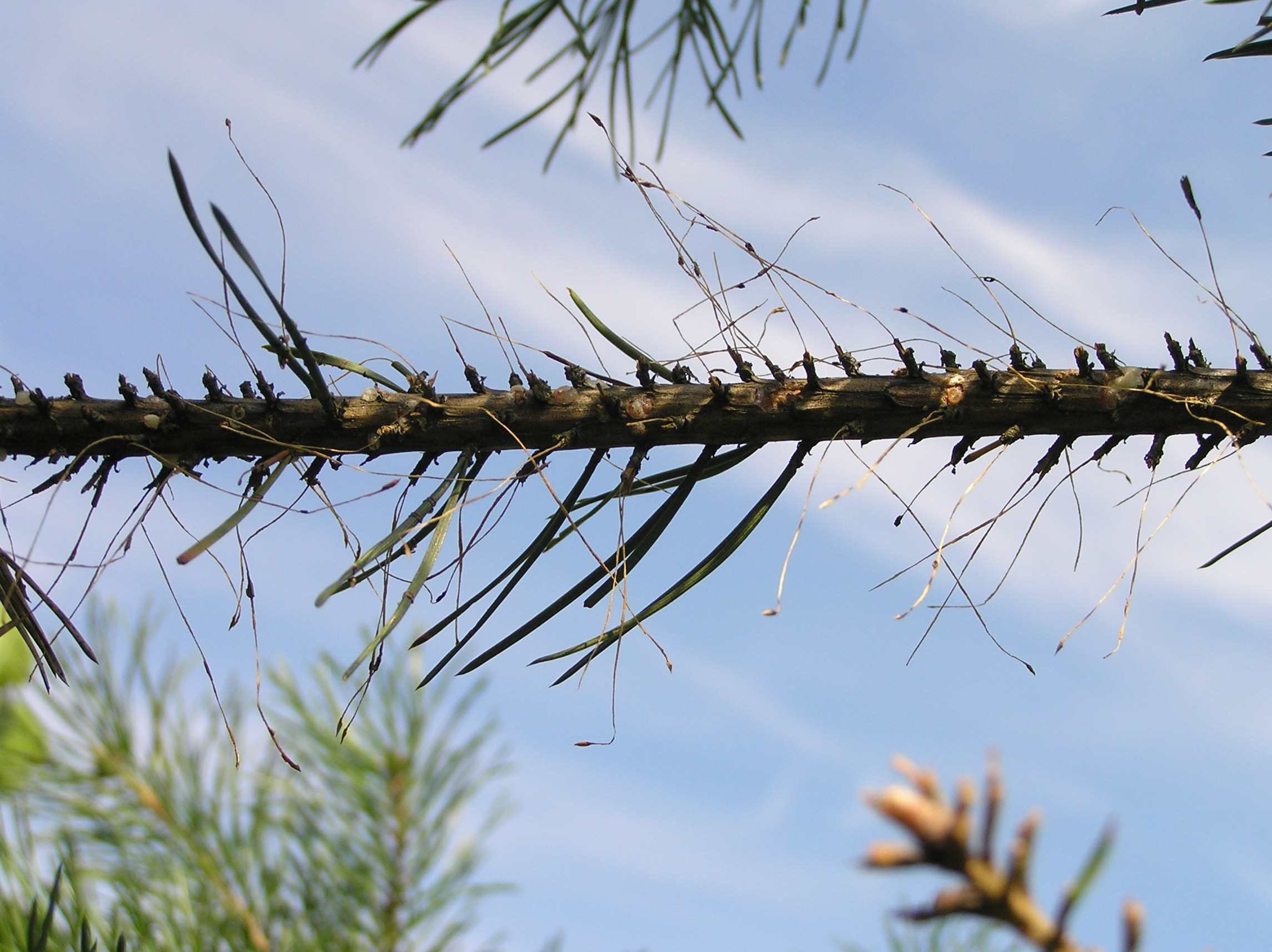
Larval damage to pine

Diprion pini is rated as among the most serious pests of pine, especially Scots pines (Pinus sylvestris), in Belarus, Russia, and Ukraine. Outbreaks are eruptive, rising rapidly to large infestations after long latent periods; this makes monitoring difficult. Outbreaks in Russia tend to happen after a hot dry summer, at intervals of roughly 3–6 years. Defoliation can reduce timber growth by as much as 94%; heavy defoliation during an outbreak has killed 30% of Scots pines in a stand in Finland. The complex population dynamics of the pest make prediction difficult, but climate variables (precipitation, temperature, and current and last year's evapotranspiration) offer a guide to likely attack sites.

Scots pines are not generally killed by a single defoliation, but weakened trees may suffer increased attack by bark beetles, buprestid beetles, and pine weevils, which can kill trees, as can repeated defoliation. Scots pines are primed to defend themselves against D. pini eggs by the insects' sex pheromones. The tree's defences include raised levels of hydrogen peroxide in pine needles.

Climate change appears to be allowing the pest to damage forests increasingly far north, such as in Scandinavia. Since it feeds until late in the autumn, affected trees are weakened and often die in the subsequent winter.

The presence of D. pini can be monitored with pheromone traps. Serious infestations are treated by aerial spraying with insecticides such as diflubenzuron or pyrethroids. Biological control with the wasp Dahlbominus fuscipennis, a parasitoid of sawfly pupae, has been used effectively. The planting of mixtures of species of tree has been proposed to reduce pest damage. The entomopathogenic fungus Beauveria pseudobassiana has been proposed as a biological control agent.

== Genomics ==
A near chromosome-level genome assembly of the species was published in 2026. The assembly spans approximately 268 Mb organized into mostly chromosome-sized sequences. The assembly has a BUSCO completeness score of 97.2%. Gene prediction identified 26,335 protein-coding genes, of which 12,769 were functionally annotated. 2,472 proteins were unique to D. pini, some potentially associated with the processing of plant secondary metabolites.
