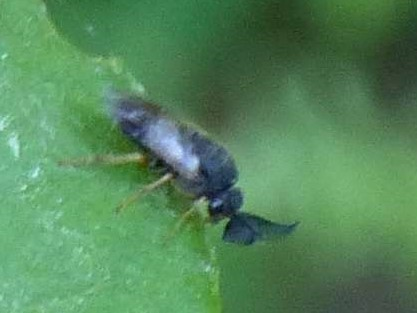

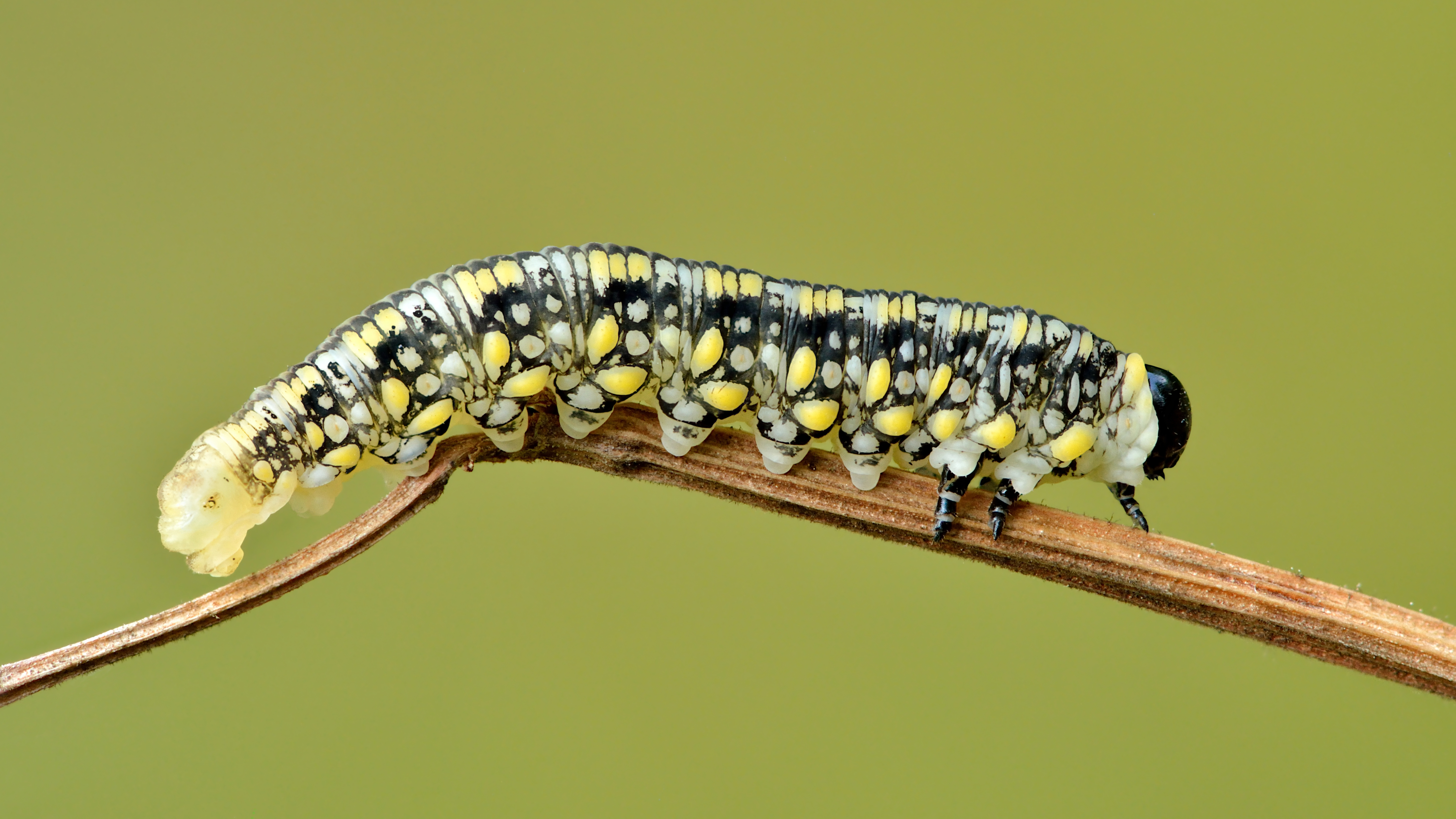
- Adult (top) and larva (bottom)

Scientific classification
- Kingdom: Animalia
- Phylum: Arthropoda
- Clade: Pancrustacea
- Class: Insecta
- Order: Hymenoptera
- Suborder: Symphyta
- Family: Diprionidae
- Genus: Diprion
- Species: D. similis

Binomial name
- Diprion similis (Hartig, 1834)

Synonyms
- Diprion eremita (Thomson); Diprion simile (Hartig); Diprion similes (Hartig); Diprion similis (Hartig); Lophyrus dorsatus (Fabricius); Lophyrus eremita Thomson; Lophyrus simile Hartig; Lophyrus similis Hartig; Neodiprion simile (Hartig); Neodiprion similis (Hartig); Tenthredo dorsata Fabricius; Tenthredo eques Schrank

= Diprion similis =

Species of sawfly

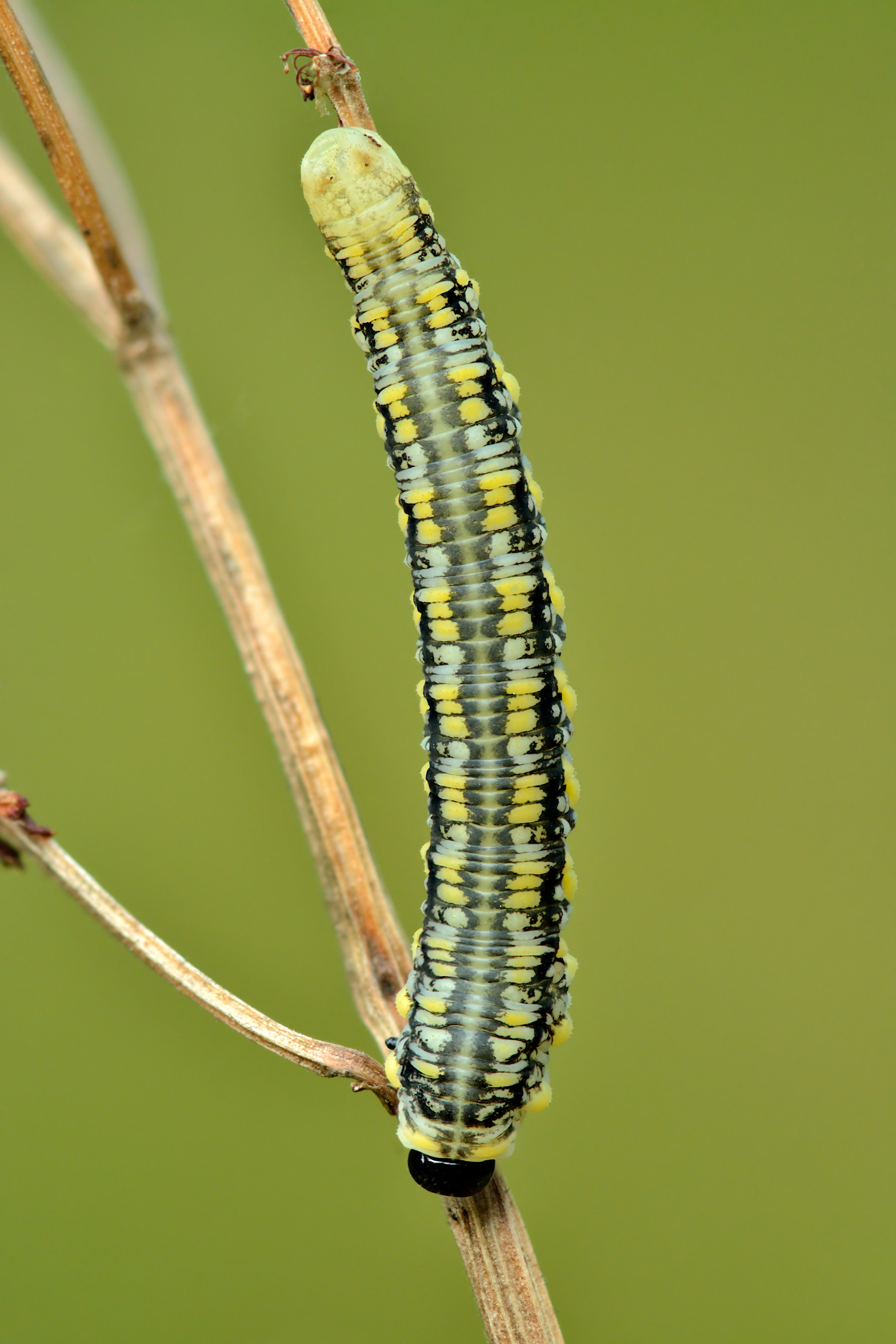
Larva (top view)

Diprion similis is a species of sawfly in the family Diprionidae. It is native to central and northern Europe and Asia but was accidentally introduced into North America where it has become invasive. The larvae feed on the needles of pine trees, especially those of the white pine (Pinus strobus). In North America it is known as the introduced pine sawfly or the imported pine sawfly. It is also known as the white pine sawfly because of its preference for feeding on the white pine, but this name is confusing because another sawfly, Neodiprion pinetum, whose larvae also feed on this tree, is itself known as the "white pine sawfly".

== Description ==
The adult male is between 7 and 9 mm (0.28 and 0.35 in) in length, black apart from the underside of the abdomen which is sometimes reddish-brown. Antennae are black and bipectinate (feather-like), and legs are yellow except for the trochanters and the base of the femora which are brownish-black. The female is between 7.5 and 10 mm (0.3 and 0.4 in) long, with a black head and thorax and usually a yellow and black abdomen, although some individuals are dark. Antennae are black and serrate (saw-like), and legs are yellow with dusky bases.

Larvae have black heads and resemble the caterpillars of lepidopterans. Females have six instars and males have five. The first three instars are yellowish-green, and the later instars have black longitudinal stripes with patches of yellow and white on a bluish and black background.

== Distribution ==
D. similis is native to central and northern Europe (including Fennoscandia), Russian Siberia (as far as the Lake Baikal region), and China. It was first detected in North America in 1914 in Connecticut and has since spread to much of the eastern United States and Canada, wherever Pinus strobus is to be found. It feeds on other species of pine, but seems to favour P. strobus where it is available.

== Hosts ==
In its natural range, the larvae feed on several species of pine including Pinus sylvestris, Pinus mugo, Pinus cembra and Pinus sibirica as well as such introduced species as Pinus strobus and Pinus contorta. In North America, as well as Pinus strobus, it feeds on Pinus resinosa, Pinus banksiana and P. sylvestris.

== Ecology ==
Diprion similis is arrhenotokous, that is it exhibits a form of parthenogenesis in which unfertilized eggs develop into male offspring. Fertilised eggs develop in the normal way into male and female offspring, n = 14 for haploid males and 2n = 28 for diploid females. Adults emerge in spring or later in the year and are active for most of the summer. The female makes a slit in a pine needle with her ovipositor and lays about ten eggs. Unmated females can lay viable eggs and these develop into male offspring. Newly hatched larvae are gregarious but later stages live independently. They feed on the needles of the pine until ready to pupate. The first generation spin cocoon in July and emerge in August. The second generation tends to drop to the ground and spend the winter in a cocoon as a prepupa, pupating in the spring. Some may remain in a prepupal state for a longer period of up to three years.

Sawflies such as this species that have been introduced into North America have found little competition from native sawfly species and become invasive pests. They have few predators or parasites in the New World and their parthenogenetic abilities have allowed them to thrive.

Sawflies employ pheromones to attract the opposite sex and facilitate breeding. It has been found that the pheromone emitted by D. similis contains the (2S,3R,7R)-propionate form of the isomer of 3,7-dimethylpentadecan-2-yl as its main component, while Neodiprion pinetum, which also feeds on white pines, uses the (2S,3S,7S)-acetate isomer as its main constituent.
