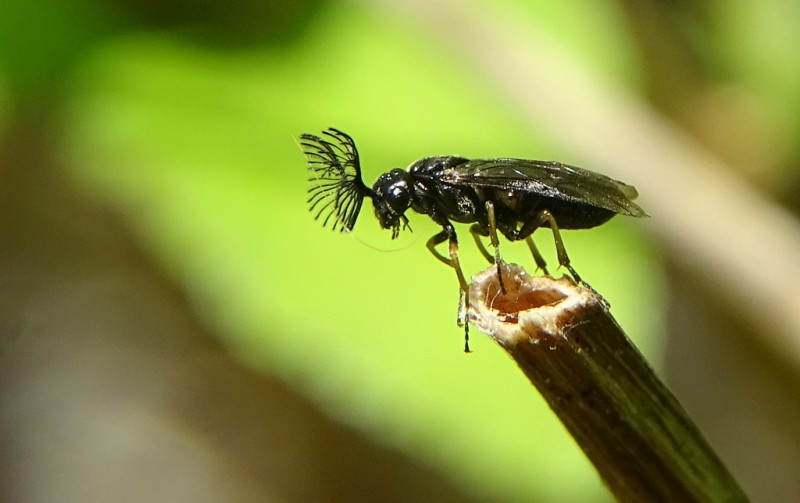
- Monoctenus juniperi

Scientific classification
- Domain: Eukaryota
- Kingdom: Animalia
- Phylum: Arthropoda
- Class: Insecta
- Order: Hymenoptera
- Suborder: Symphyta
- Superfamily: Tenthredinoidea
- Family: Diprionidae

= Diprionidae =

Family of sawflies

Gilpinia video

The Diprionidae are a small family of conifer-feeding sawflies (thus the common name conifer sawflies, though other Symphyta also feed on conifers) restricted to the Northern Hemisphere, with some 140 species in 13 genera. Larvae are often gregarious, and sometimes there can be major outbreaks, thus these sawflies can be major forest pests at times. These sawflies have the ability to compromise the health and ecological balance of forests. When the temperatures begin to rise, the sawflies become strengthened pests to these conifers. In doing so, they cause damage to a certain extent.

The family has distinctive antennae with about 20 flagellomeres. Males have pectinate antennae and females have serrate antennae.

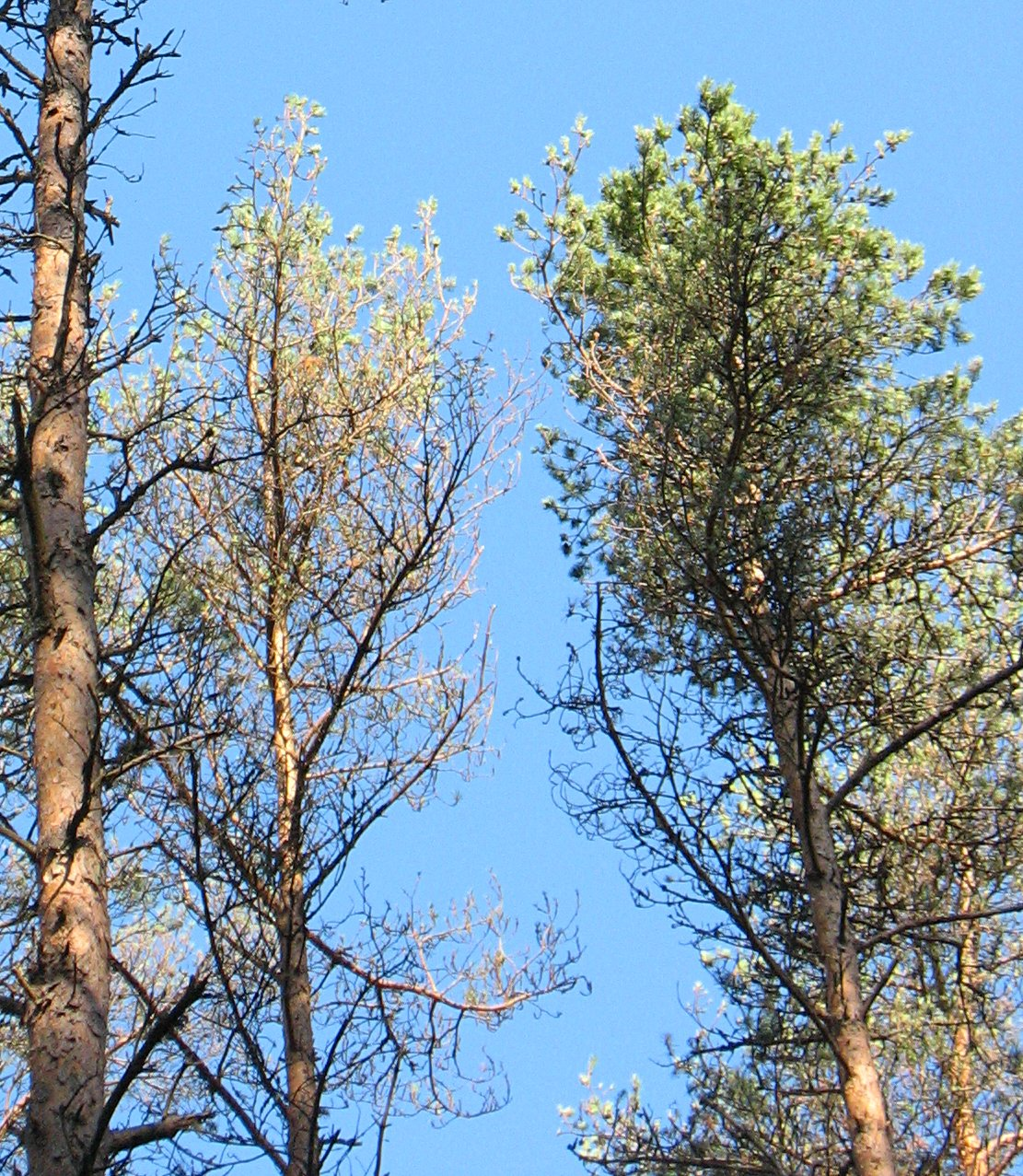
Sawfly infestation in Scots pines

== Genera ==
These 13 genera belong to the family Diprionidae:

- Augomonoctenus Rohwer, 1918
- Diprion Schrank, 1802
- Gilpinia Benson, 1939
- Macrodiprion Enslin, 1914
- Microdiprion Enslin, 1914
- Monoctenus Dahlbom, 1835
- Neodiprion Rohwer, 1918
- Nesodiprion Rohwer, 1910
- Prionomeion Benson, 1939
- Rhipidoctenus Benson, 1954
- Zadiprion Rohwer, 1918
- † Eodiprion Schedl, 2007
- † Paleomonoctenus Nel, 2004
