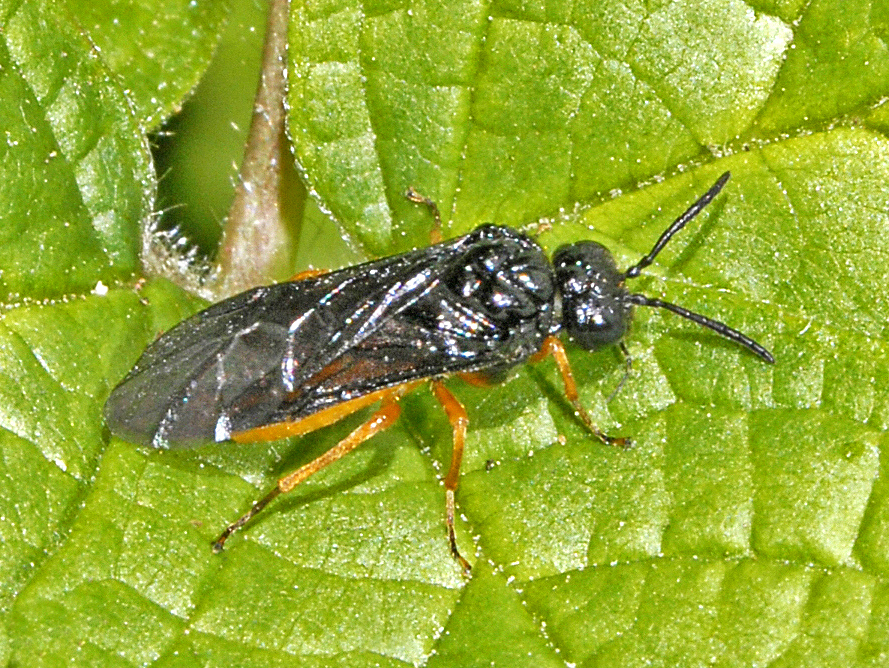
- Eutomostethus luteiventris

Scientific classification
- Domain: Eukaryota
- Kingdom: Animalia
- Phylum: Arthropoda
- Class: Insecta
- Order: Hymenoptera
- Suborder: Symphyta
- Family: Tenthredinidae
- Genus: Eutomostethus
- Species: E. luteiventris

Binomial name
- Eutomostethus luteiventris (Klug, 1814)

Synonyms
- Tenthredo luteiventris Klug, 1816

= Eutomostethus luteiventris =

Species of sawfly

Eutomostethus luteiventris is a species of sawfly belonging to the family Tenthredinidae, subfamily Blennocampinae.

== Distribution and habitat ==
This species is present in the Nearctic realm and in most of Europe, with exception of the Balkan and Iberian Peninsula. It mainly inhabits wet meadows and hedge rows.

== Description ==
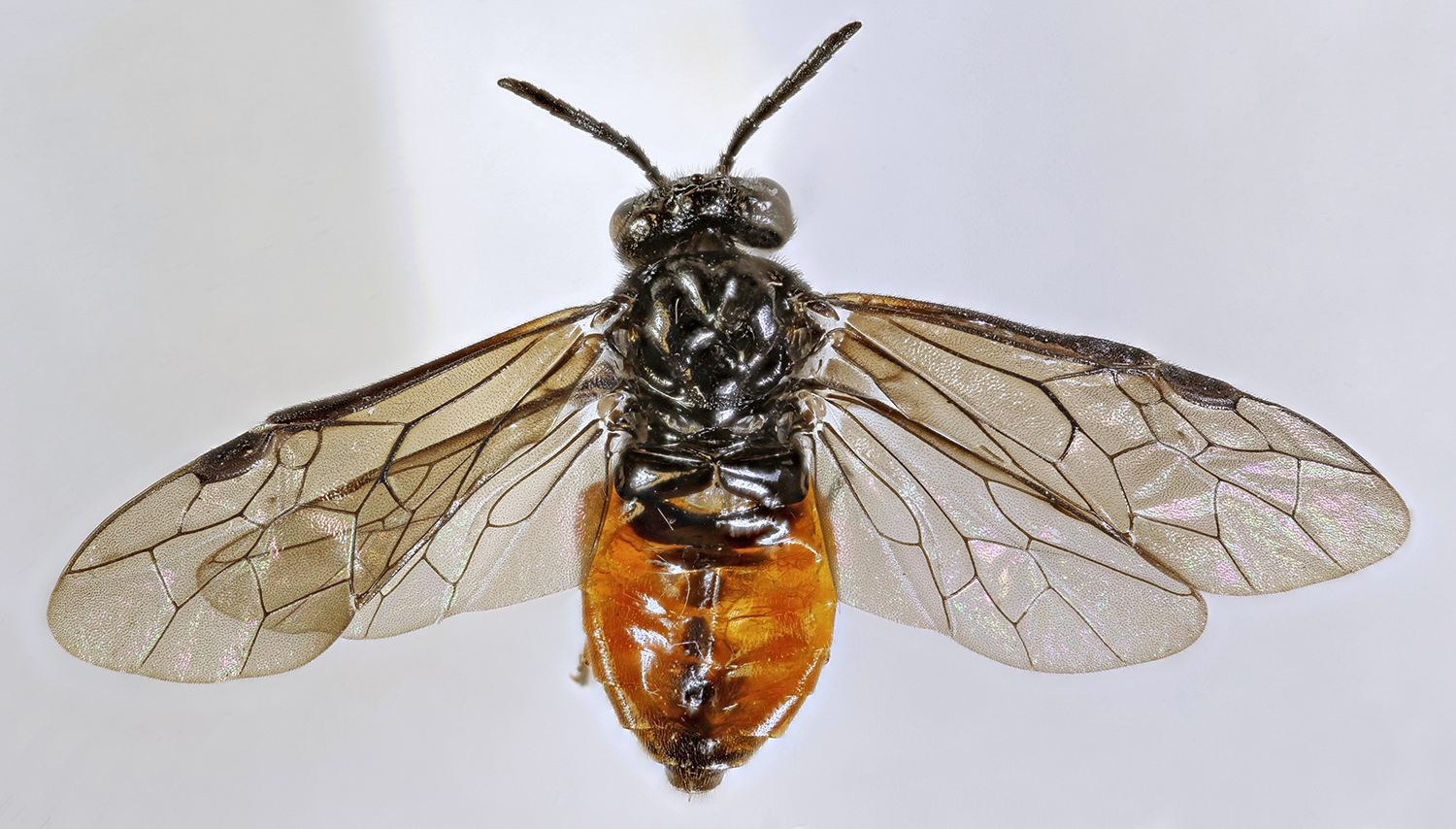
Mounted specimen

Eutomostethus luteiventris can reach a length of 5–7 millimetres (0.20–0.28 in). Head, antennae and thorax are shining black. Abdomen is orange, with black basal plates and apical segments. Wings are rather infuscate. Legs are mainly orange, but the apical half of the forefemurs are black.

== Biology ==
Adults can be found in May and July, while larvae are present in July and August. Adults feed on nectar of Anthriscus sylvestris, while larvae are monophagous, feeding only on Juncaceae (Juncus articulatus, Juncus conglomeratus and Juncus effusus).
