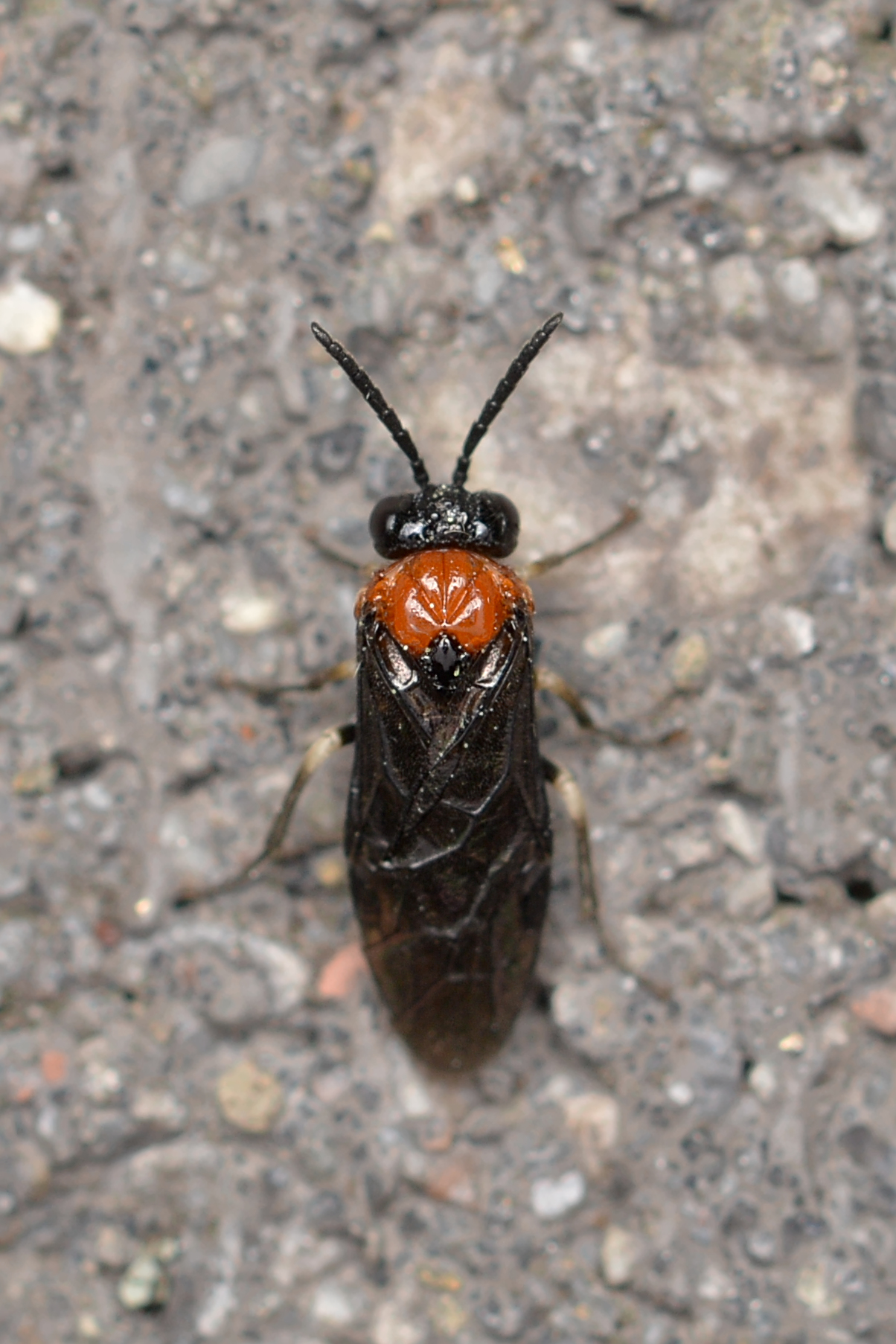
- Eutomostethus ephippium

Scientific classification
- Domain: Eukaryota
- Kingdom: Animalia
- Phylum: Arthropoda
- Class: Insecta
- Order: Hymenoptera
- Suborder: Symphyta
- Family: Tenthredinidae
- Subfamily: Blennocampinae

= Blennocampinae =

Subfamily of sawflies

Blennocampinae is a subfamily of common sawflies in the family Tenthredinidae. There are more than 100 genera and 600 described species in Blennocampinae.

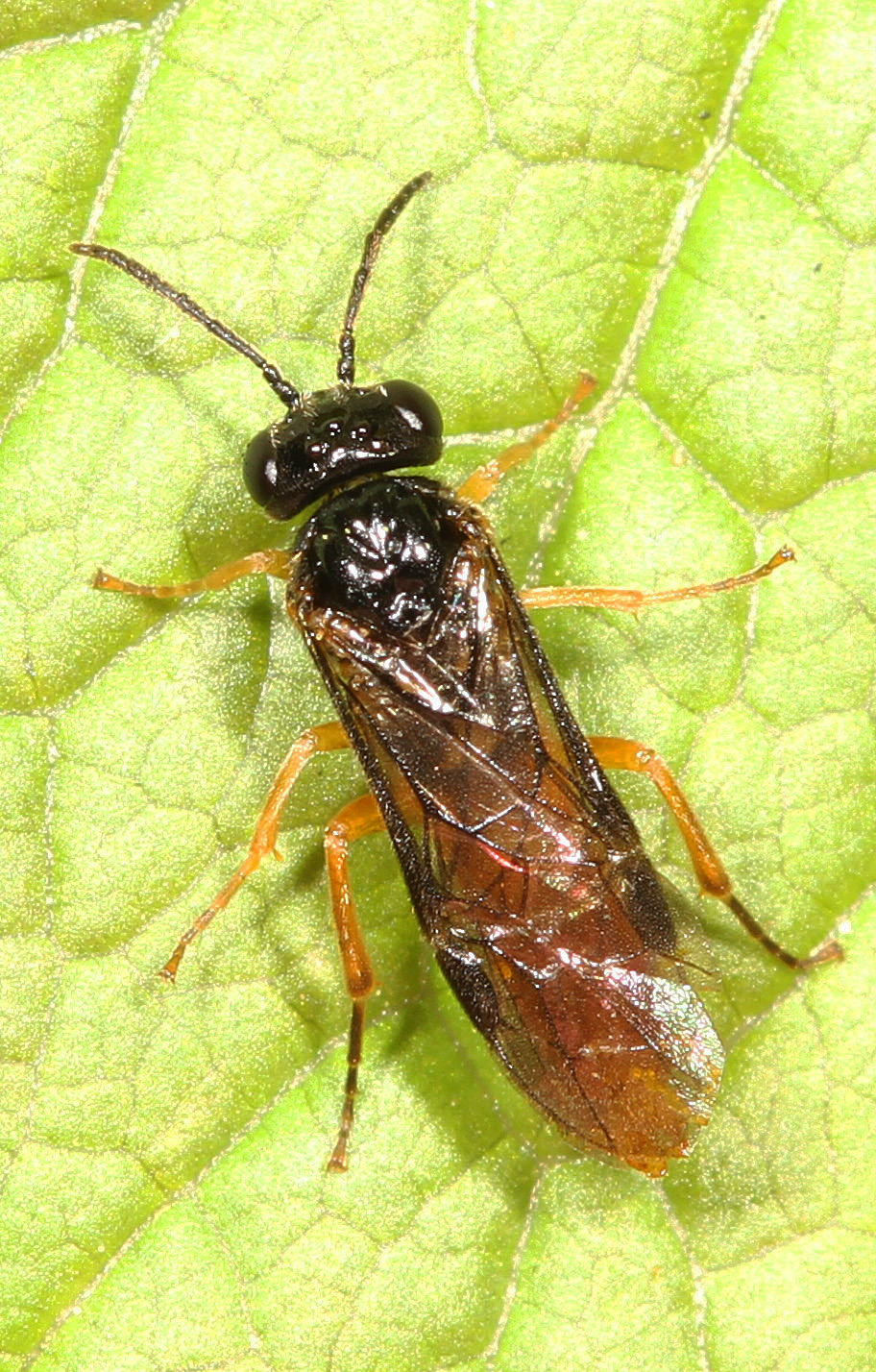
Halidamia affinis

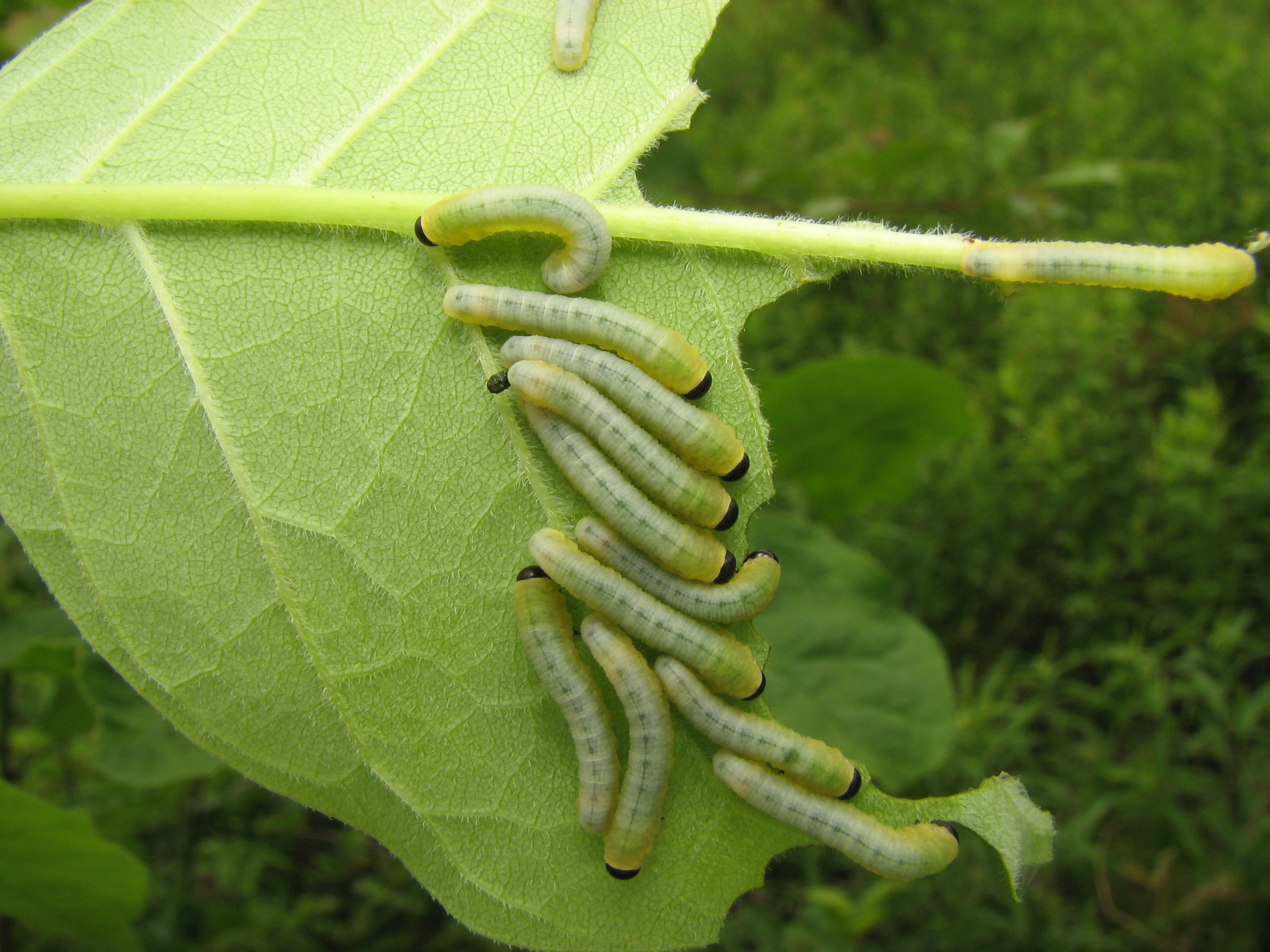
Tethida barda larvae

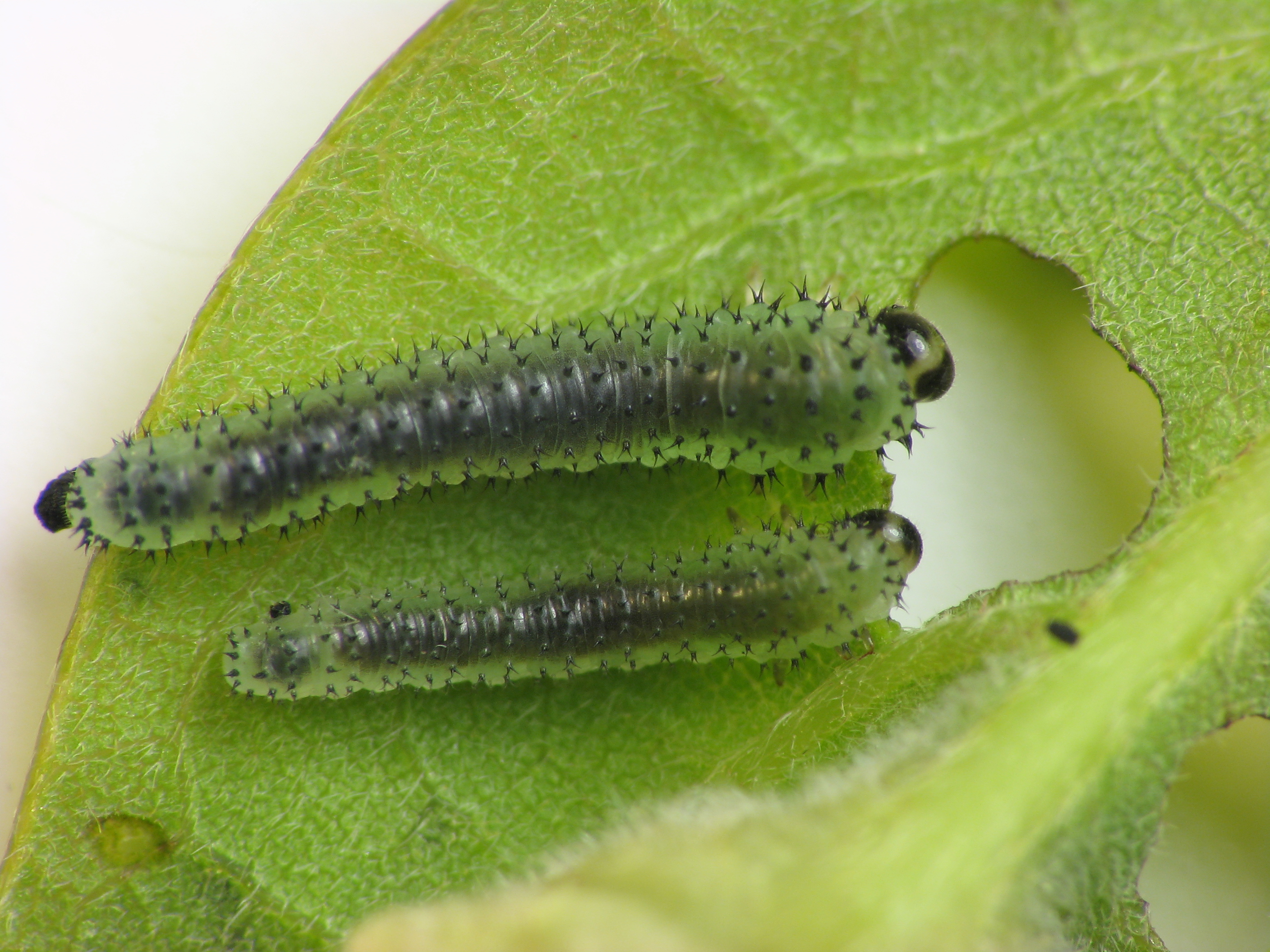
Periclista larvae

== Genera ==
These genera belong to the subfamily Blennocampinae:

- Aethiocampa Pasteels, 1949
- Amonophadnus Rohwer, 1921
- Anisoarthra Cameron, 1876
- Apareophora Sato, 1928
- Aphymatocera Sato, 1928
- Ardis Konow, 1886
- Astethomostus Wei, 1997
- Bavonia Pesarini, 2004
- Belesempria Wei, 1997
- Beleses Cameron, 1877
- Bensoniana Malaise, 1942
- Blennia Malaise, 1964
- Blennocampa Hartig, 1837
- Blennogeneris MacGillivray, 1923
- Borgenia Togashi, 2009
- Brykella Malaise, 1943
- Bua Wei & Nie, 1998
- Ceratulus Macgillivray, 1908
- Cheilophleps Benson, 1938
- Chevinia Lacourt, 2003
- Cladardis Benson, 1952
- Claremontia Rohwer, 1909
- Condeia Malaise, 1935
- Corcova Malaise, 1964
- Cornaria Malaise, 1964
- Corpilus Malaise, 1937
- Davida Saini & Vasu, 1996
- Dianstethus Wei & Nie, 1998
- Diranga Saini & Vasu, 1997
- Distega Konow, 1904
- Emegatomostethus Wei, 1997
- Esehabachia Togashi, 1984
- Eupareophora Enslin, 1914
- Eurhadinoceraea Enslin, 1920
- Eutomostethus Enslin, 1914
- Genatomostethus Wei & Nie, 2002
- Gussakovskia Malaise, 1935
- Habachia Takeuchi, 1952
- Halidamia Benson, 1939
- Hanumantus Saini, Singh, Singh & Singh, 1985
- Hoplocampoides Enslin, 1914
- Kivua Forsius, 1934
- Kompongia Malaise, 1937
- Lagonis Ross, 1937
- Liuacampa Wei & W. Xiao, 1997
- Loopica Saini & Vasu, 1998
- Lycaota Konow, 1903
- Malaisea Forsius, 1933
- Malkiatus Smith, 2006
- Masaakia Takeuchi, 1950
- Megatomostethus Takeuchi, 1933
- Meliniola Malaise, 1935
- Metaneura Malaise, 1950
- Metapedias Enderlein, 1920
- Monardis Benson, 1952
- Monardoides Wei Meicai & Wu Weiwen, 1998
- Monophadnoides Ashmead, 1898
- Monophadnus Hartig, 1837
- Neoclia Malaise, 1937
- Nervobeleses Wei, Nie & Taeger, 2006
- Nesotomostethus Rohwer, 1910
- Niea Wei, 1998
- Nipponocampa Okutani, 1972
- Nipponostethus Togashi, 1997
- Notodontidea Wei Meicai, 1996
- Obtusia Malaise, 1964
- Onychostethomostus Togashi, 1984
- Parabeleses Wei & Nie, 1998
- Paracharactus MacGillivray, 1908
- Paramasaakia Ermolenko, 1971
- Pareophora Konow, 1886
- Pasteelsia Malaise, 1964
- Pedicellidea Malaise, 1964
- Periclista Konow, 1886
- Phymatocera Dahlbom, 1835
- Phymatoceridea Rohwer, 1916
- Phymatoceriola Sato, 1928
- Phymatoceropsis Rohwer, 1916
- Pseudopareophora Wei & Nie, 1998
- Revatra Wei & Nie, 1998
- Rhadinoceraea Konow, 1886
- Rya Malaise, 1964
- Salatigia Enslin, 1911
- Selandriopsis Costa, 1875
- Senoclidea Rohwer, 1912
- Siniara Malaise, 1964
- Songyuna Wei Meicai & Nie Haiyan, 1998
- Stenocampa Wei & Nie, 1997
- Stethomostus Benson, 1939
- Tesslinia Pasteels, 1951
- Tethida Ross, 1937
- Tomostethus Konow, 1886
- Trichotaxonus Rohwer, 1910
- Tridentocampa Wei & Nie, 1998
- Trisodontophyes Pasteels, 1949
- Ulotomostethus Forsius, 1935
- Umegatomostethus Wei, 1997
- Ungulirhadina Wei Meicai, 1997
- Waldheimia Brullé, 1846
- Wuhongia Wei & Nie, 1998
- Yuccacia Wei Meicai & Nie Haiyan, 1998
- Zaphymatocera Sato, 1928
- Zhuana Wei, 1997
- † Durbadnus Pasteels, 1954
- † Synaptoneura Pruvost, 1920
- † Ucona Smith, 1973
