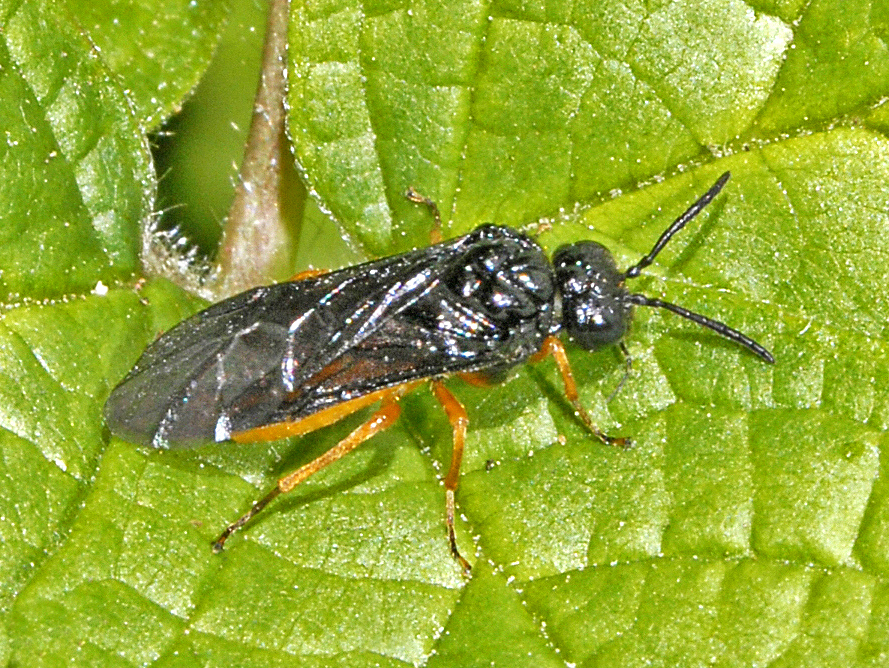
- Eutomostethus luteiventris

Scientific classification
- Domain: Eukaryota
- Kingdom: Animalia
- Phylum: Arthropoda
- Class: Insecta
- Order: Hymenoptera
- Suborder: Symphyta
- Family: Tenthredinidae
- Subfamily: Blennocampinae
- Tribe: Phymatocerini
- Genus: Eutomostethus; Enslin, 1914

= Eutomostethus =

Genus of sawflies

Eutomostethus is a genus of sawflies belonging to the family Tenthredinidae, subfamily Blennocampinae.

== Species ==
Species within this genus include:

- Eutomostethus ephippium (Panzer, 1798)
- Eutomostethus gagathinus (Klug, 1814)
- Eutomostethus luteiventris (Klug, 1814)
- Eutomostethus nigrans Blank & Taeger, 1998
- Eutomostethus punctatus (Konow, 1887)
