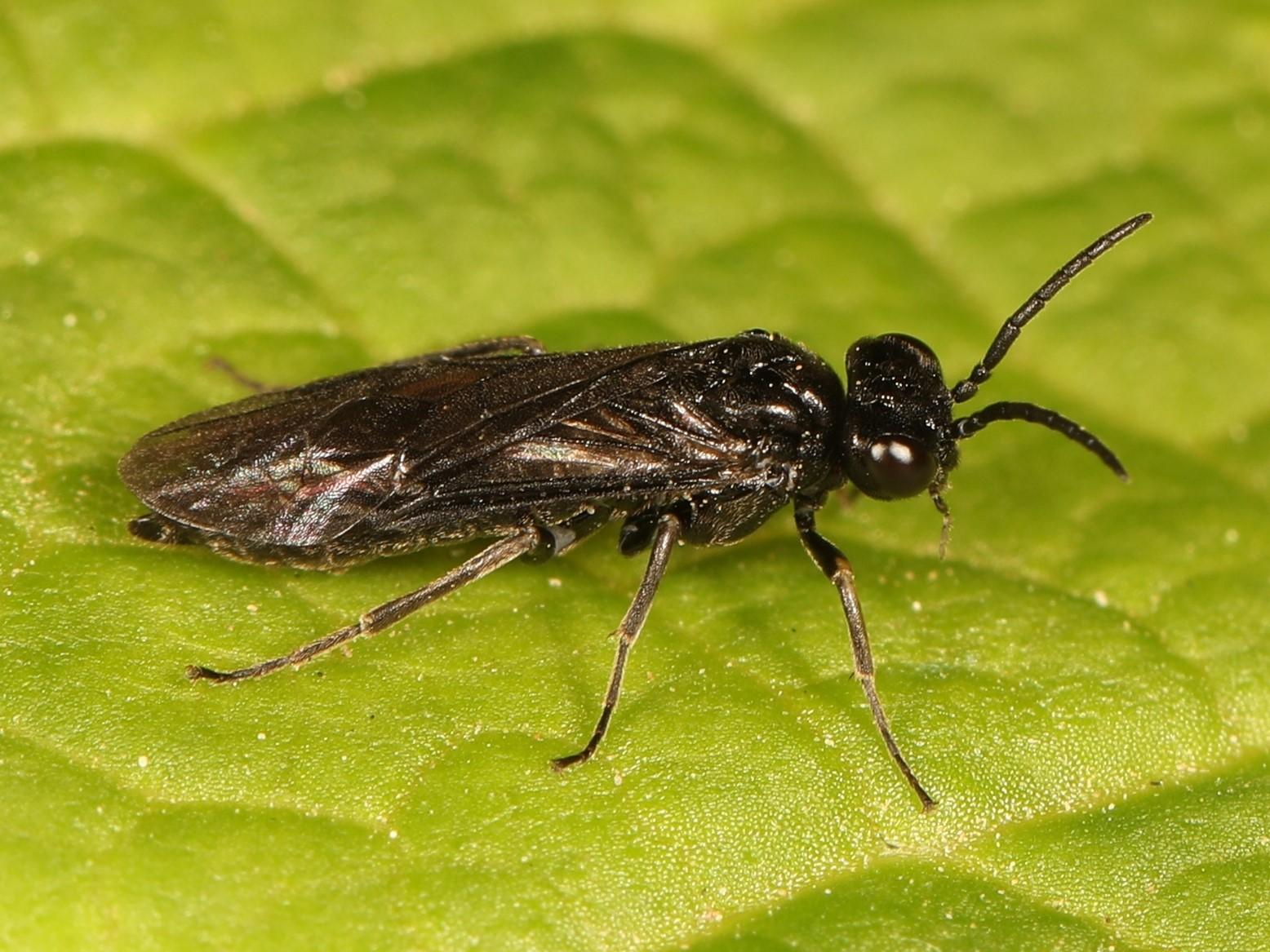
- Cladardis elongatula

Scientific classification
- Kingdom: Animalia
- Phylum: Arthropoda
- Class: Insecta
- Order: Hymenoptera
- Suborder: Symphyta
- Family: Tenthredinidae
- Subfamily: Blennocampinae
- Genus: Cladardis; Benson, 1952

= Cladardis =

Genus of sawflies

Cladardis is a genus of sawflies belonging to the family Tenthredinidae.

== Species ==
The following species are recognised in the genus Cladardis:

- Cladardis elongatula
- Cladardis hartigi
