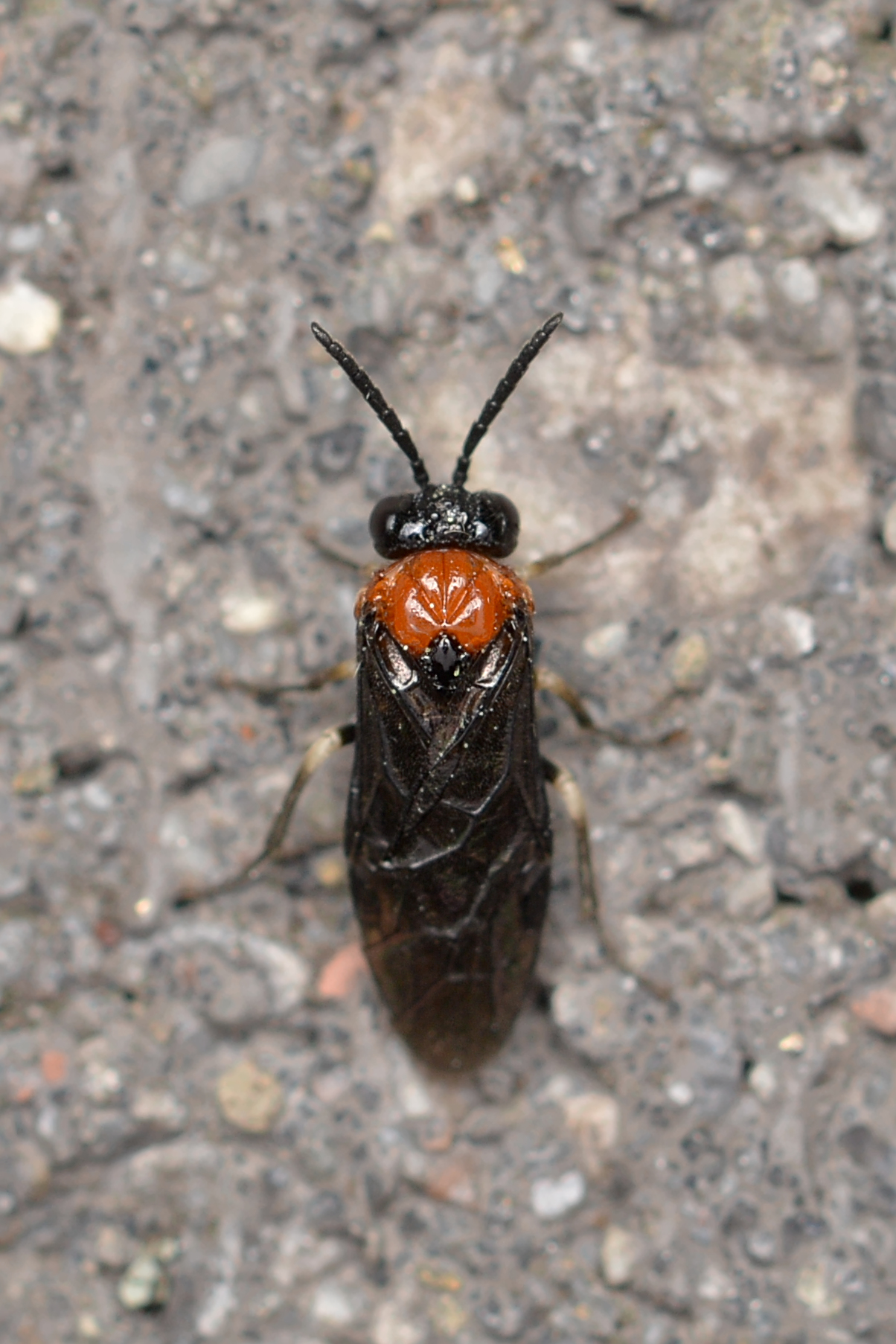

Scientific classification
- Domain: Eukaryota
- Kingdom: Animalia
- Phylum: Arthropoda
- Class: Insecta
- Order: Hymenoptera
- Suborder: Symphyta
- Family: Tenthredinidae
- Genus: Eutomostethus
- Species: E. ephippium

Binomial name
- Eutomostethus ephippium (Panzer, 1798)

= Eutomostethus ephippium =

Species of sawfly

Eutomostethus ephippium is a species of common sawfly in the family Tenthredinidae.

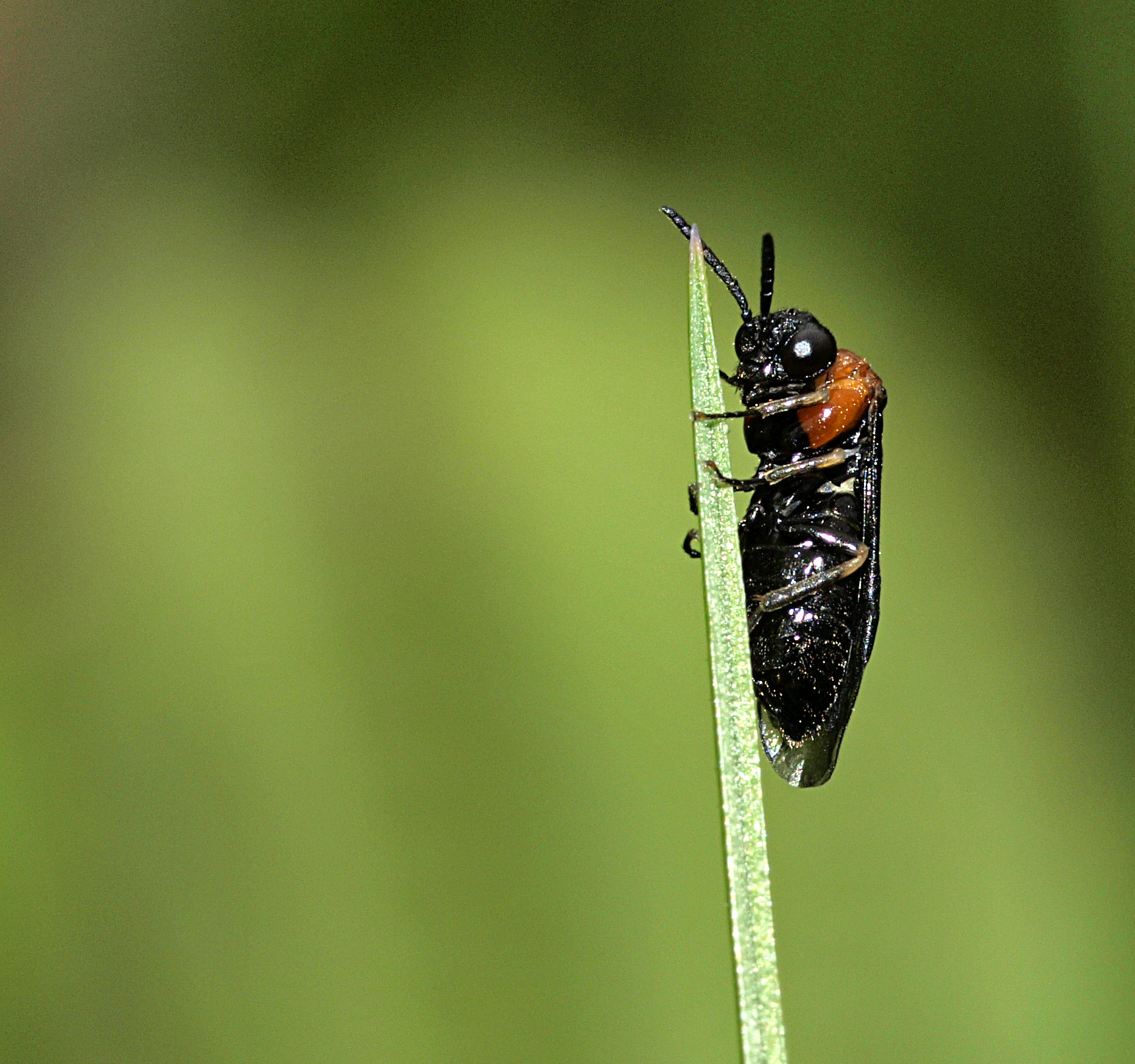

== Subspecies ==
These two subspecies belong to the species Eutomostethus ephippium:

- Eutomostethus ephippium ephippium (Panzer, 1798)^{g}
- Eutomostethus ephippium vopiscus (Konow, 1899)^{g}

Data sources: g = GBIF,

== Ecology ==
Eutomostethus ephippium has been recorded on various grasses including species of Poa.
