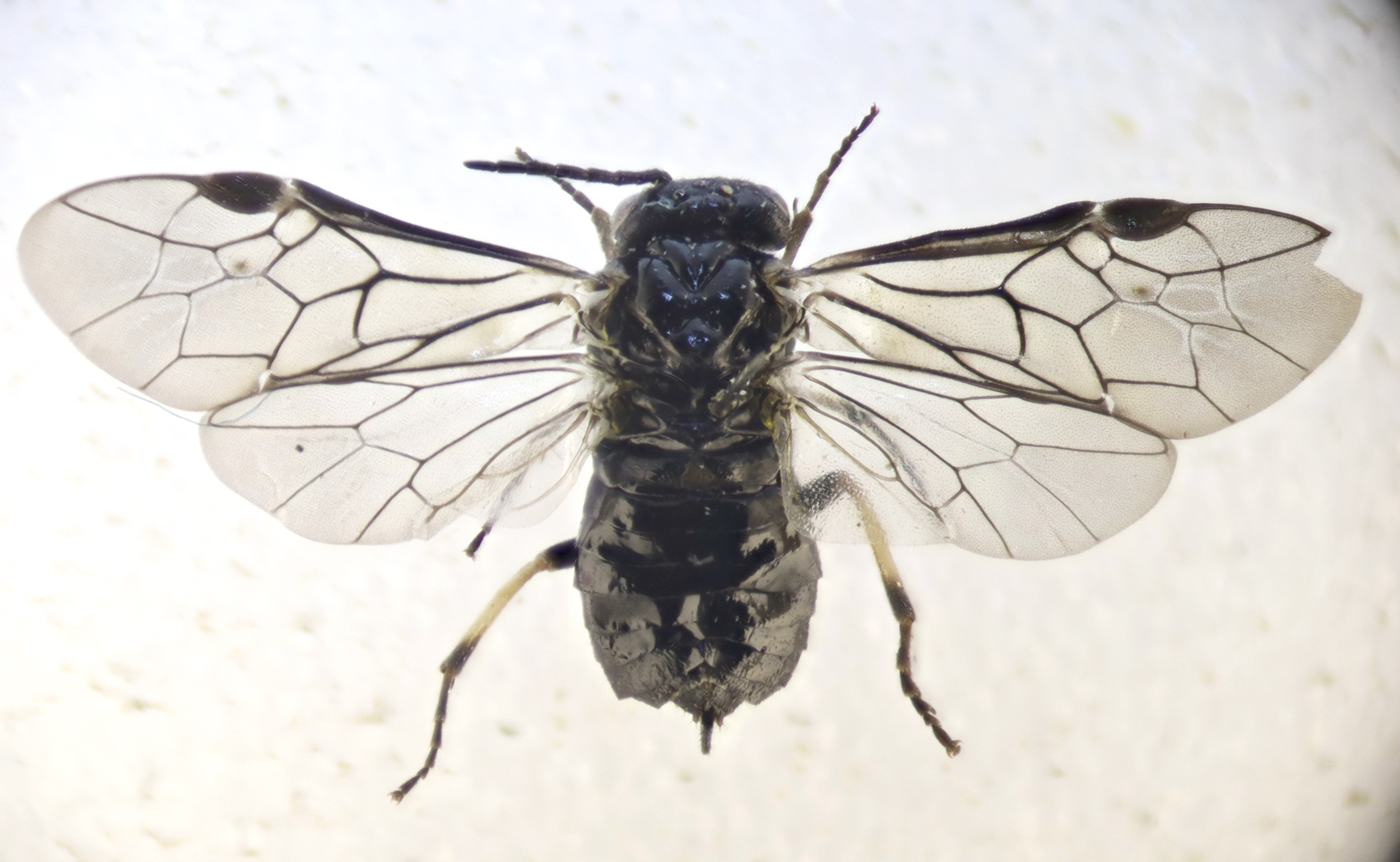
- Female Claremontia hispanica

Scientific classification
- Domain: Eukaryota
- Kingdom: Animalia
- Phylum: Arthropoda
- Class: Insecta
- Order: Hymenoptera
- Suborder: Symphyta
- Family: Tenthredinidae
- Subfamily: Blennocampinae
- Genus: Claremontia; Rohwer, 1909

= Claremontia =

Genus of sawflies

Claremontia is a genus of insects belonging to the family Tenthredinidae.

The genus was first described by Rohwer in 1909.

The species of this genus are found in Europe.

Species:

- Claremontia alternipes
- Claremontia brevicornis
- Claremontia hispanica
- Claremontia tenuicornis
- Claremontia uncta
- Claremontia waldheimii
