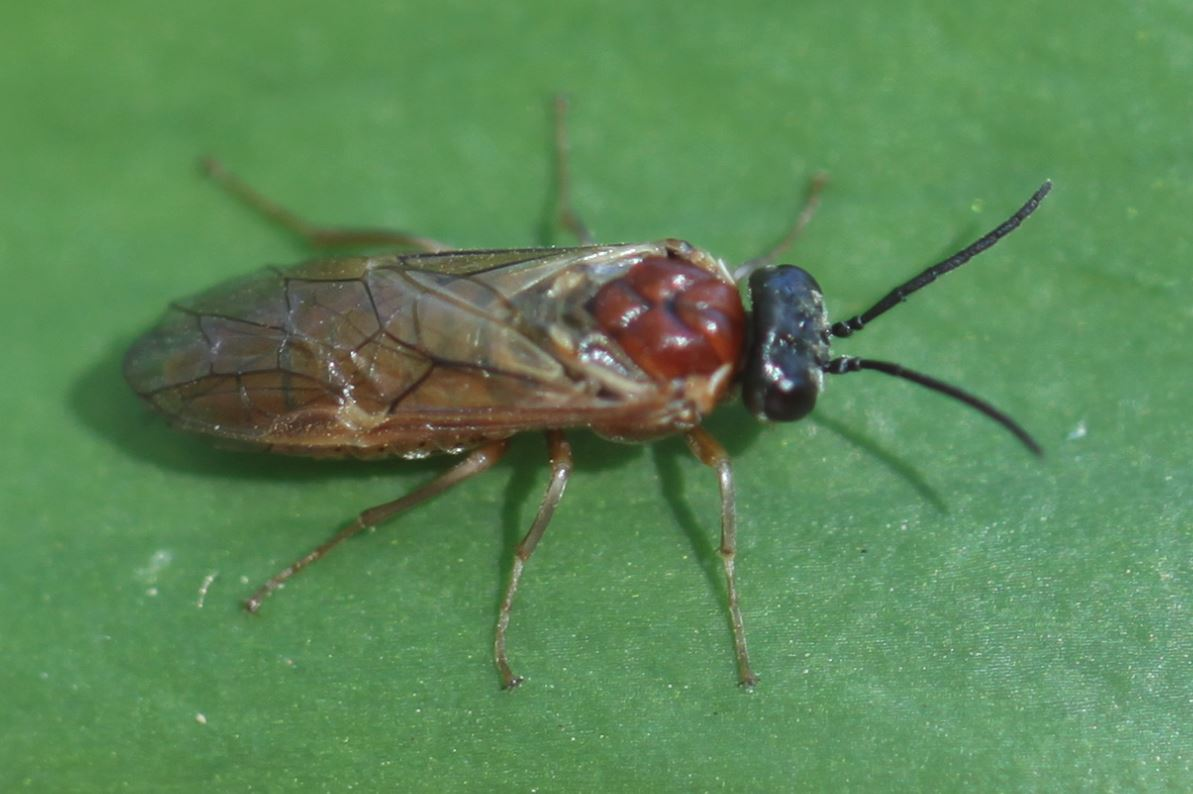
- Periclista albida Germany

Scientific classification
- Domain: Eukaryota
- Kingdom: Animalia
- Phylum: Arthropoda
- Class: Insecta
- Order: Hymenoptera
- Suborder: Symphyta
- Family: Tenthredinidae
- Genus: Periclista
- Species: P. albida

Binomial name
- Periclista albida (Klug, 1816)

= Periclista albida =

Species of sawfly

Periclista albida is a Palearctic species of sawfly.
