= Tomostethus multicinctus =

Scientific classification
- Kingdom: Animalia
- Phylum: Arthropoda
- Clade: Pancrustacea
- Class: Insecta
- Order: Hymenoptera
- Suborder: Symphyta
- Family: Tenthredinidae
- Genus: Tomostethus
- Species: T. multicinctus

Binomial name
- Tomostethus multicinctus (Rohwer, 1909)

Species of sawfly

Tomostethus multicinctus, the brownheaded ash sawfly, is a species of sawfly in the family Tenthredinidae that is native to southern Canada and the eastern United States. Adults of this species resemble wasps and the larvae feed on the leaves of ash trees.

== Description ==
The brownheaded ash sawfly is commonly found in the eastern United States and southern Canada. It is a pest to green or red ash and white ash trees although any species of ash is vulnerable; female insects lay groups of eggs in slits in the leaflets of emerging leaves in late spring. The larvae are greenish or yellow-white, and they grow to between 14 and 20 mm (0.6 and 0.8 in) long. At first the larvae eat the central part of the leaflets, making pinpoint holes, but they feed voraciously and grow rapidly, eating all the leaf tissue except for the veins. A heavy infestation can cause complete defoliation of the tree in a week, but there is only one generation of larvae each year and new leaves soon grow. High winds can detach the larvae from the leaves. When the larvae shed their skin for the final time, the skin stays attached to the leaves, while the larvae fall to the ground, where they create cocoons in the topsoil and spend the winter as prepupae. They pupate in the cocoon in early spring, emerging as adult insects when the ash leaves begin to unfurl. Large numbers of the insects are often seen swarming around ash trees at this time.

The adults are black and do not sting, like other sawfly species. Sawflies receive their name because the females have a structure that resembles a saw on the tip of their abdomen.

== Predators and control ==
Parasitic wasps are known to eat the larvae. Two red-eyed vireo were witnessed bashing the larvae against a twig up to eighteen times, and then consuming them with multiple swallows without any noise. Other birds observed consuming the larvae in the study were a rose-breasted grosbeak, an English sparrow, and two catbirds.

A hose or soapy water can be used to loosen the larvae from a tree. Most insecticides for use in a garden can kill the larvae. Practices to get rid of the larvae must be completed in the beginning of their infestation.
