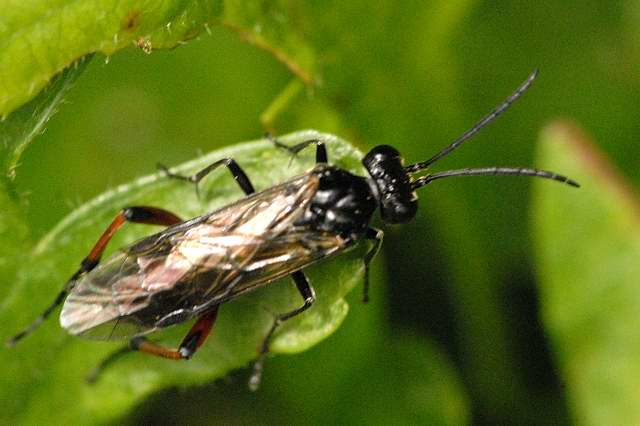
- Tomostethus nigritus

Scientific classification
- Kingdom: Animalia
- Phylum: Arthropoda
- Class: Insecta
- Order: Hymenoptera
- Suborder: Symphyta
- Family: Tenthredinidae
- Subfamily: Blennocampinae
- Genus: Tomostethus; Konow, 1886

= Tomostethus =

Genus of sawflies

Tomostethus is a genus of sawflies. It includes the species Tomostethus multicinctus, Tomostethus nigritus, and others. It was first described in 1886.
