= Blennocampa =

Scientific classification
- Kingdom: Animalia
- Phylum: Arthropoda
- Clade: Pancrustacea
- Class: Insecta
- Order: Hymenoptera
- Suborder: Symphyta
- Family: Tenthredinidae
- Subfamily: Blennocampinae
- Genus: Blennocampa; Hartig, 1837

Genus of sawflies

Blennocampa is a genus of insects belonging to the family Tenthredinidae.

The genus was first described by Theodor Hartig in 1837.

Species:

- Blennocampa gusenleitneri
- Blennocampa phyllocolpa
