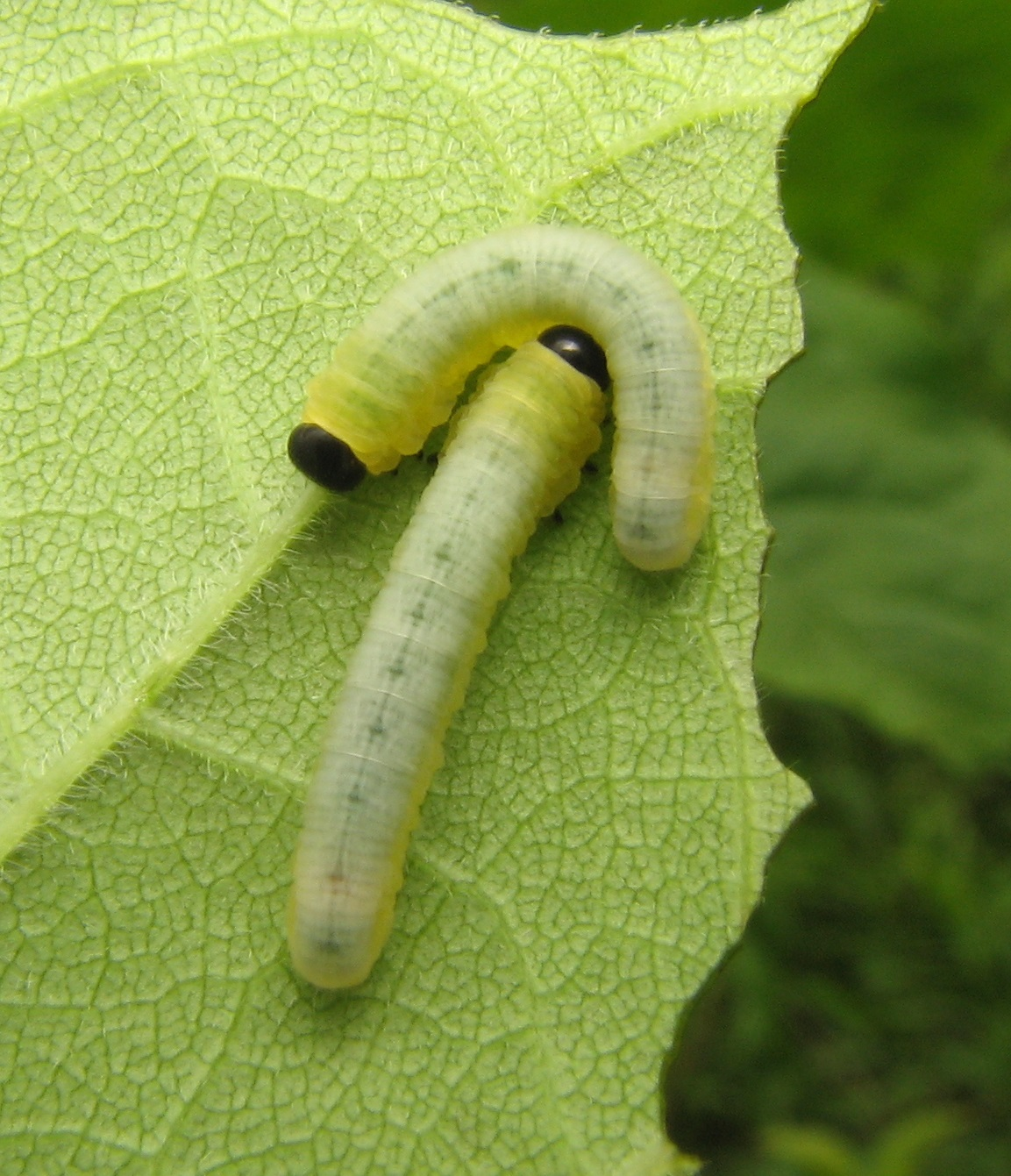
- Tethida barda larvae

Scientific classification
- Domain: Eukaryota
- Kingdom: Animalia
- Phylum: Arthropoda
- Class: Insecta
- Order: Hymenoptera
- Suborder: Symphyta
- Family: Tenthredinidae
- Tribe: Tomostethini
- Genus: Tethida; Ross, 1937

= Tethida =

Genus of sawflies

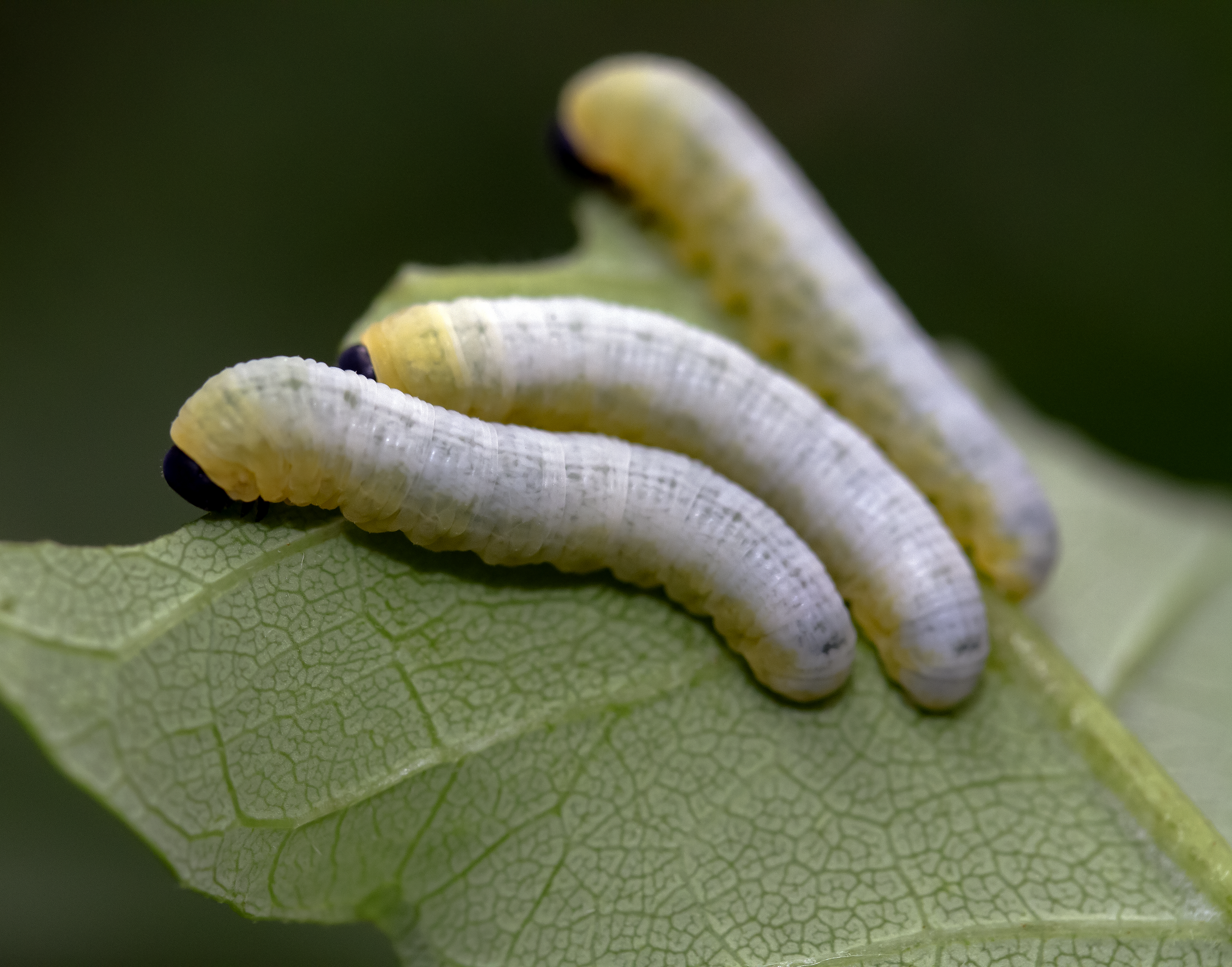
Black-headed Ash Sawfly (Tethida barda) larvae

Tethida is a genus of common sawflies in the family Tenthredinidae. There is one described species in Tethida, T. barda.
