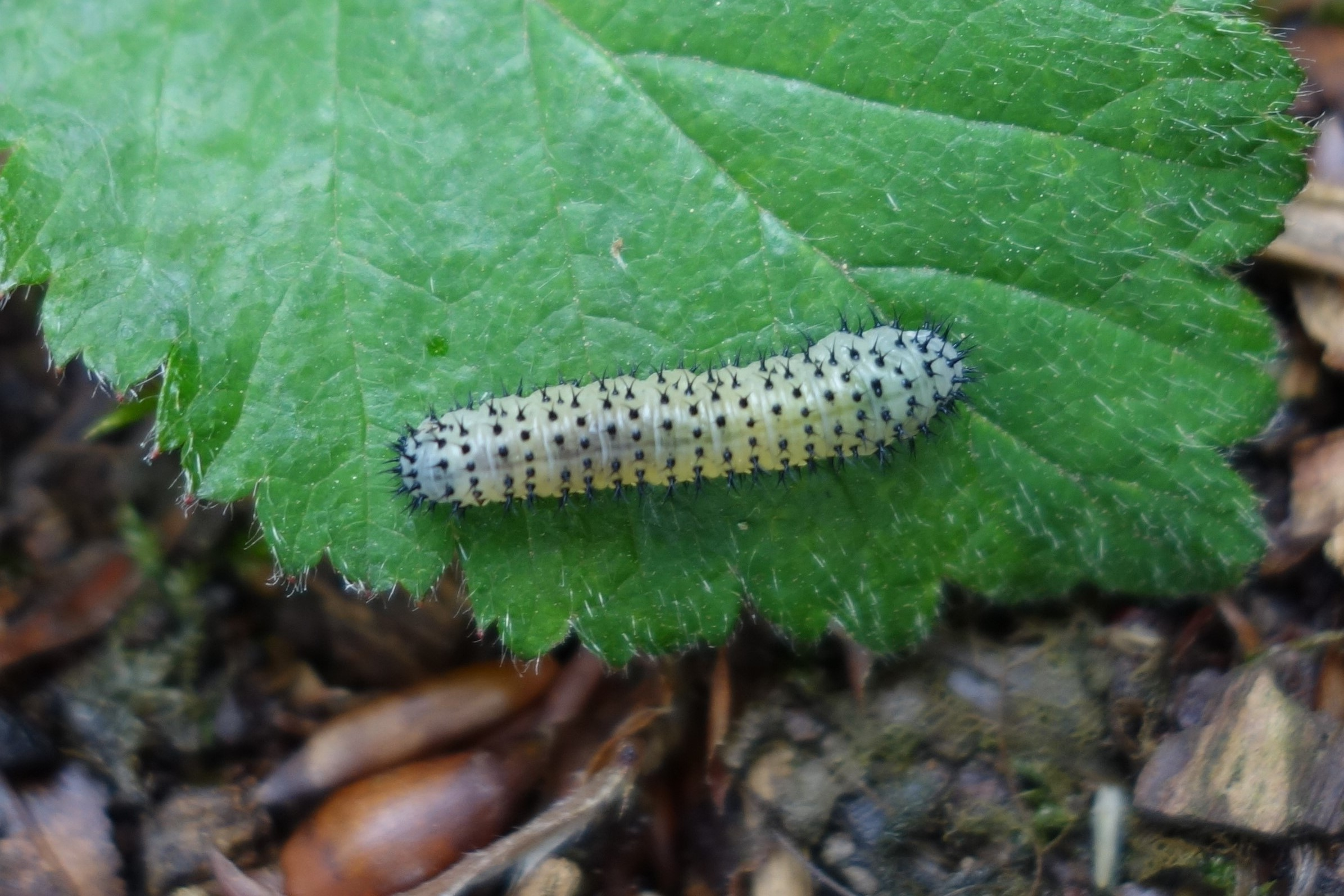

Scientific classification
- Domain: Eukaryota
- Kingdom: Animalia
- Phylum: Arthropoda
- Class: Insecta
- Order: Hymenoptera
- Suborder: Symphyta
- Family: Tenthredinidae
- Tribe: Blennocampini
- Genus: Periclista; Konow, 1886

= Periclista =

Genus of sawflies

Periclista is a genus of common sawflies in the family Tenthredinidae. There are at least 20 described species in Periclista.

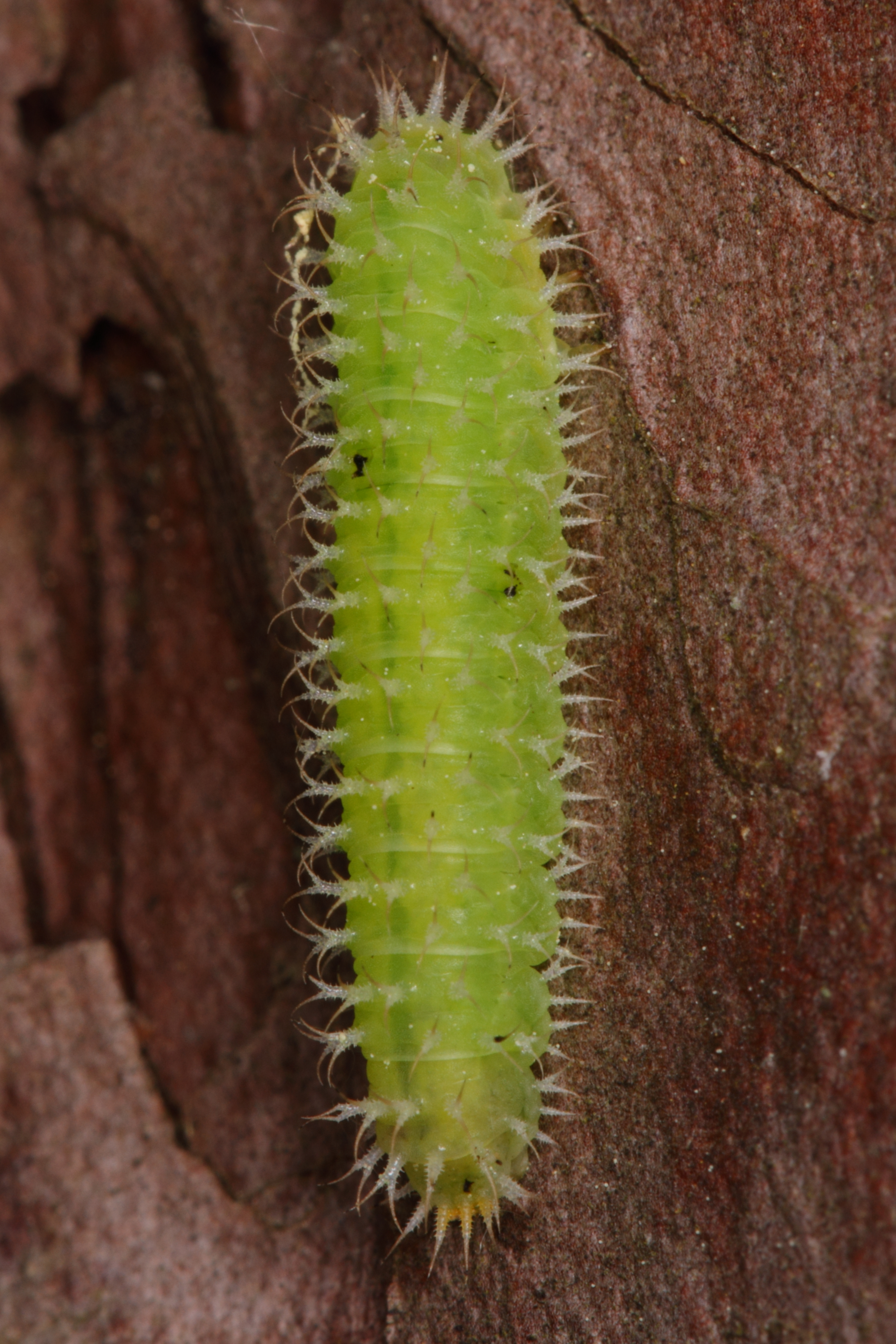

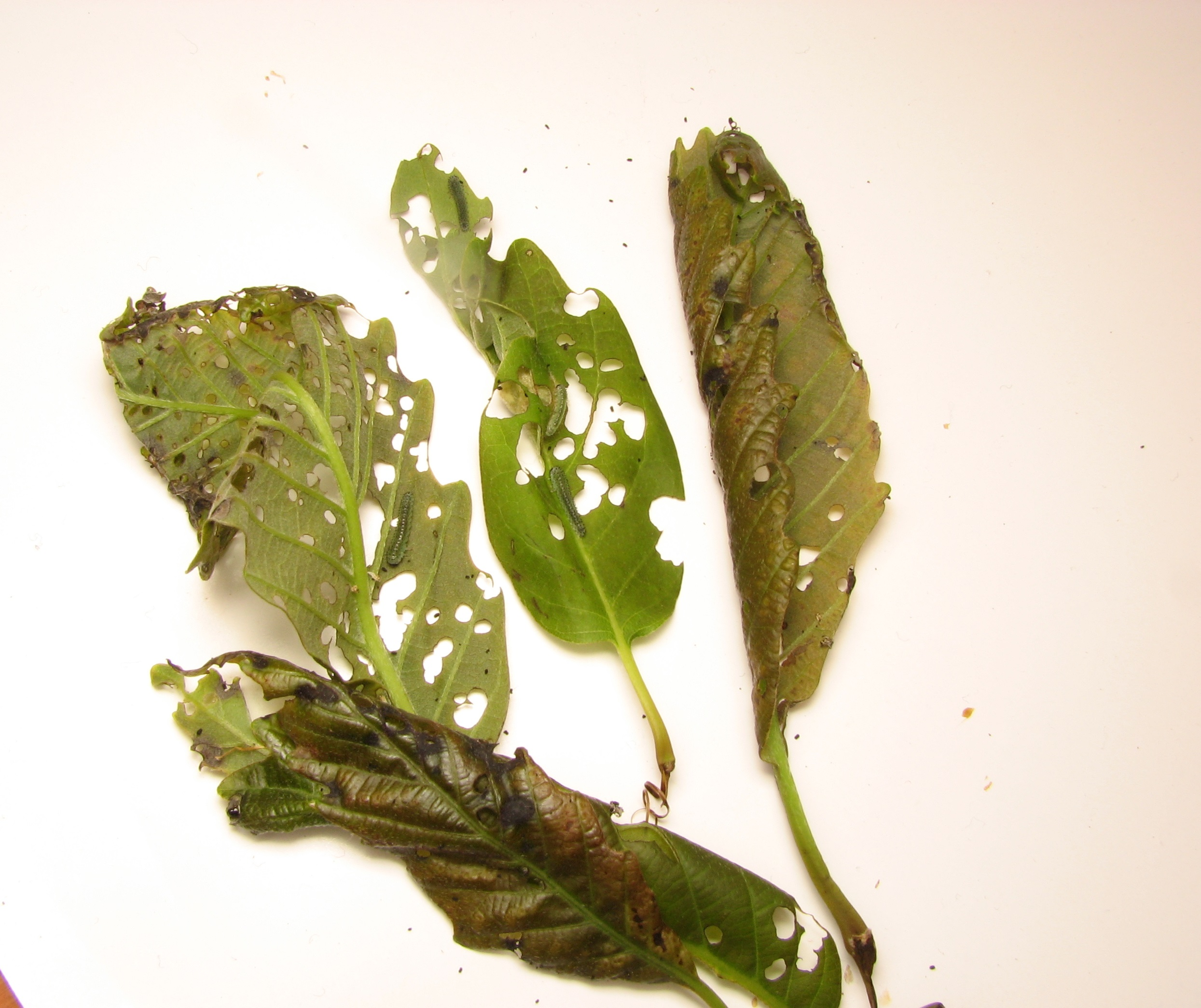
Periclista larvae leaf damage

== Species ==
These 23 species belong to the genus Periclista:

- Periclista albicollis Norton, 1872^{b}
- Periclista albida (Klug, 1816)^{g}
- Periclista albipennis (Zaddach, 1859)^{g}
- Periclista albiventris (Klug, 1816)^{g}
- Periclista analis Konow, 1886^{g}
- Periclista andrei Konow, 1906^{g}
- Periclista coiffaiti Chevin, 1980^{g}
- Periclista cretica (W.Schedl, 1981)^{g}
- Periclista diluta Cresson, 1880^{b}
- Periclista dusmeti Konow, 1907^{g}
- Periclista freidbergi D.R.Smith, 1982^{g}
- Periclista hermonensis D.R.Smith, 1982^{g}
- Periclista lenta Konow, 1903^{g}
- Periclista lineolata (Klug, 1816)^{g}
- Periclista major (Neocharactus) major Smith, 2012^{b}
- Periclista media Norton, 1864^{b}
- Periclista osellai F.Pesarini & Turrisi, 2003^{g}
- Periclista pilosa Chevin, 1971^{g}
- Periclista pubescens (Zaddach, 1859)^{g}
- Periclista rufiventris Zombori, 1979^{g}
- Periclista sicelis F.Pesarini & Turrisi, 2003^{g}
- Periclista vernalis Lacourt, 1985^{g}
- Periclista wittmeri Zombori, 1979^{g}

Data sources: i = ITIS, c = Catalogue of Life, g = GBIF, b = Bugguide.net
