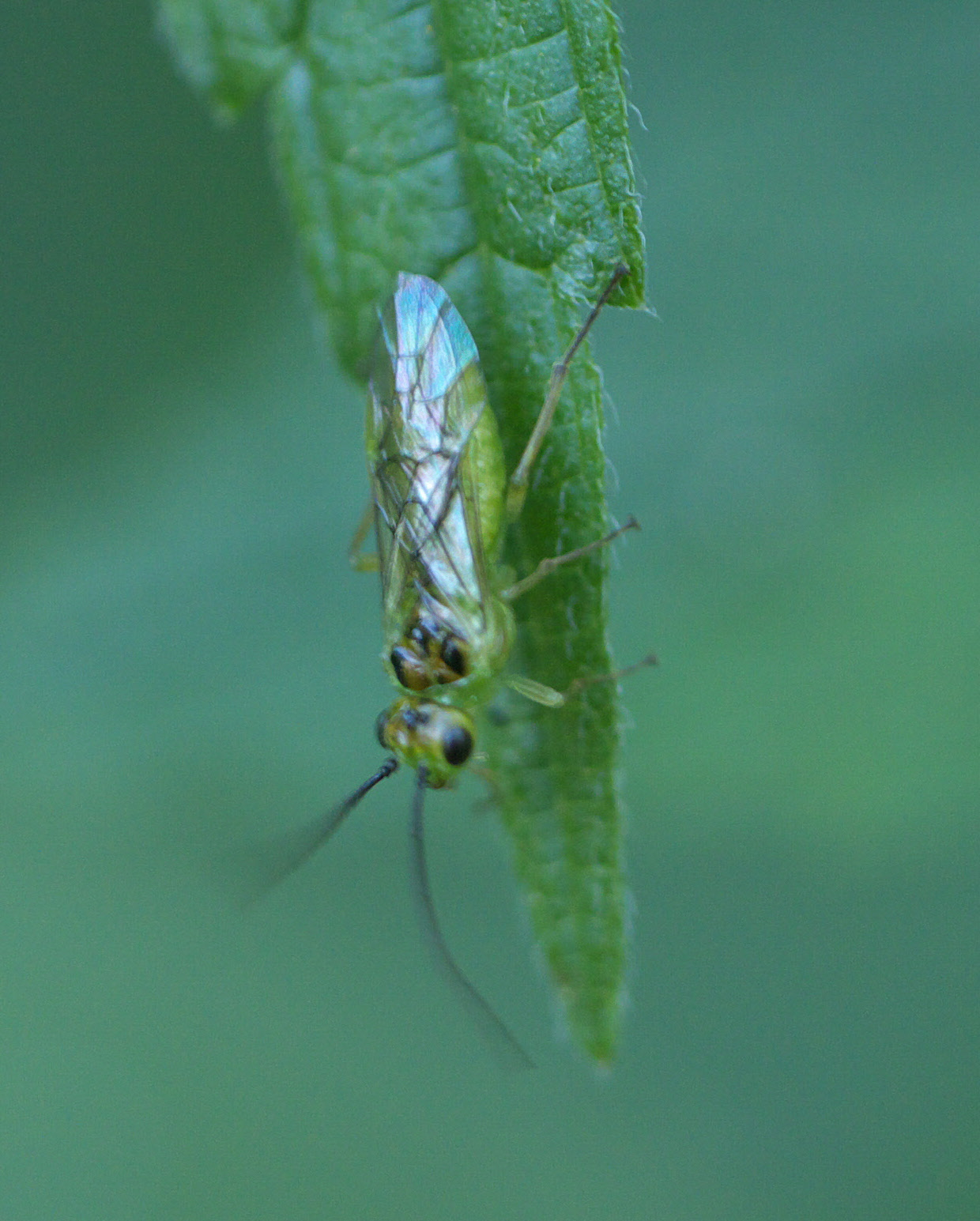
- Nematus

Scientific classification
- Domain: Eukaryota
- Kingdom: Animalia
- Phylum: Arthropoda
- Class: Insecta
- Order: Hymenoptera
- Suborder: Symphyta
- Family: Tenthredinidae
- Subfamily: Nematinae
- Tribe: Nematini

= Nematini =

Tribe of sawflies

Nematini is a tribe of common sawflies in the family Tenthredinidae. There are about 14 genera and at least 30 described species in Nematini.

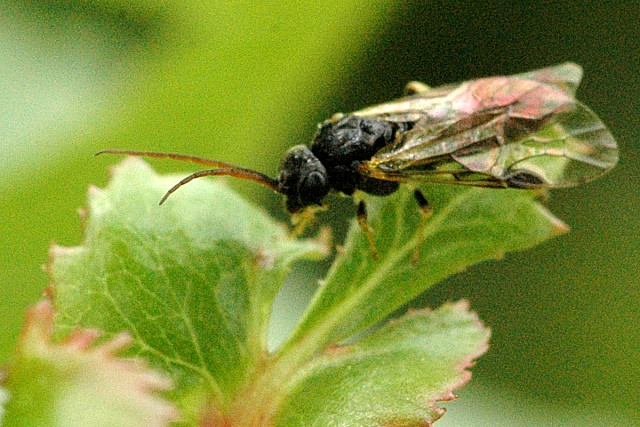
Pristiphora geniculata

== Genera ==
These 14 genera belong to the tribe Nematini:

- Amauronematus Konow, 1890^{g b}
- Anoplonyx Marlatt, 1896^{g b}
- Craesus Leach, 1817^{g b}
- Craterocercus Rohwer, 1911^{g b}
- Euura Newman, 1837^{g b}
- Hemichroa Stephens, 1835^{i c g b}
- Hoplocampa Hartig, 1837^{i c g b}
- Nematus Panzer, 1801^{i c g b} (willow sawflies)
- Neopareophora^{b}
- Pachynematus Konow, 1890^{i c g b}
- Phyllocolpa Benson, 1960^{i c g b}
- Pikonema Ross, 1937^{i c g b}
- Pontania Costa, 1859^{i c g b}
- Pristiphora Latreille, 1810^{i c g b}

Data sources: i = ITIS, c = Catalogue of Life, g = GBIF, b = Bugguide.net
