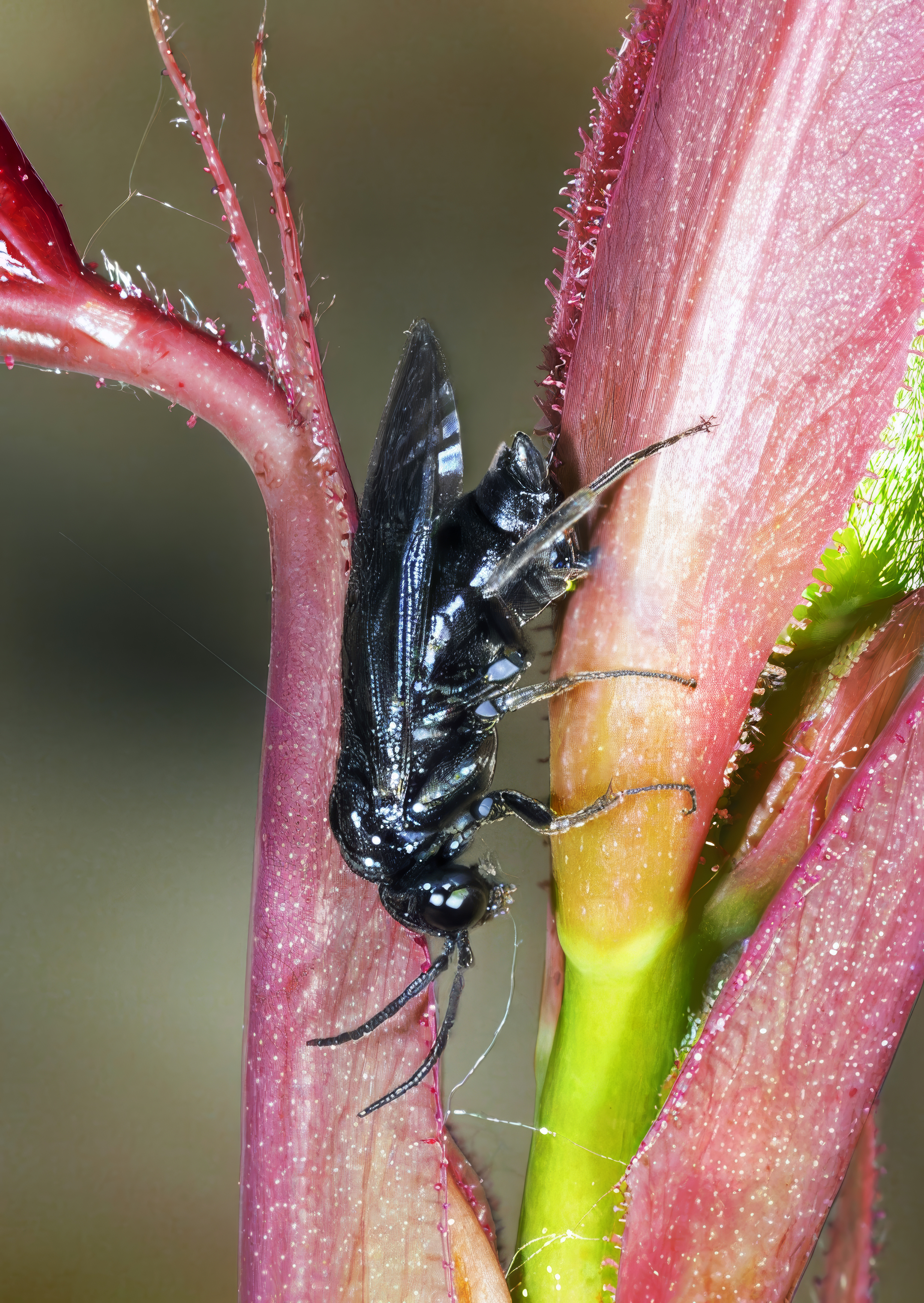
- Caliroa cerasi

Scientific classification
- Domain: Eukaryota
- Kingdom: Animalia
- Phylum: Arthropoda
- Class: Insecta
- Order: Hymenoptera
- Suborder: Symphyta
- Family: Tenthredinidae
- Subfamily: Heterarthrinae; Benson, 1952

= Heterarthrinae =

Subfamily of sawflies

Heterarthrinae is a subfamily of sawflies under the family Tenthredinidae. It is primarily found in Eurasia and North America, with several species also in Africa and South America.

== Taxonomy ==
This subfamily contains the following genera, split between tribes:

- Tribe Caliroini Benson, 1938
  - Caliroa Costa, 1859
  - Endelomyia Ashmead, 1898
- Tribe Fenusini MacGillivray, 1906
  - Fenella Westwood, 1839
  - Fenusa Leach, 1817
  - Fenusella Enslin, 1912
  - Metallus Forbes, 1885
  - Parna Benson, 1936
  - Profenusa MacGillivray, 1914
  - Scolioneura Konow, 1890
- Tribe Heterarthrini Benson, 1952
  - Heterarthrus Stephens, 1835
- Other, incertae sedis, or unknown
  - Hinatara Benson, 1936
  - Neomessa Koch, 1990
  - Silliana Malaise, 1949
