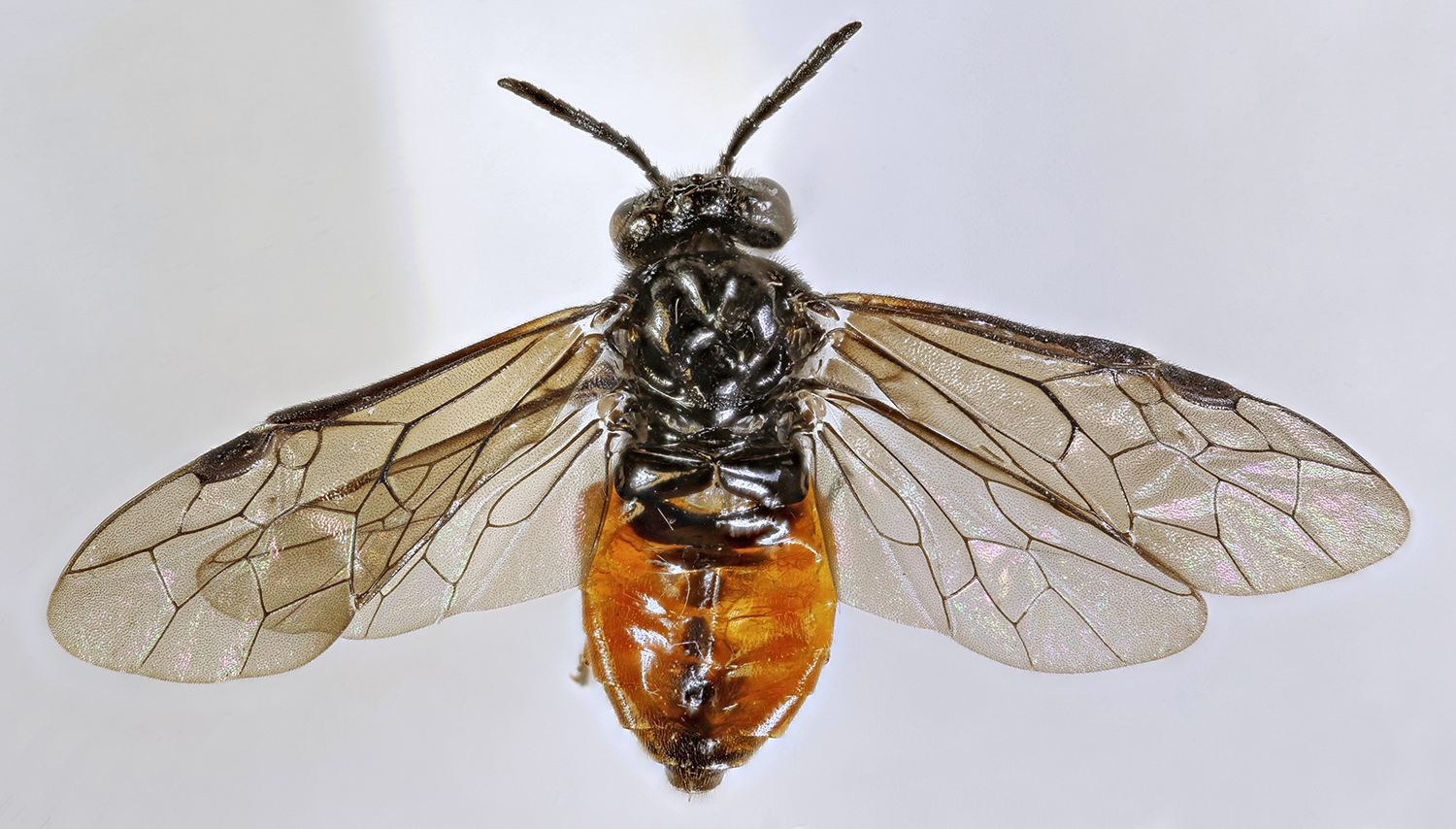
- Eutomostethus luteiventris

Scientific classification
- Domain: Eukaryota
- Kingdom: Animalia
- Phylum: Arthropoda
- Class: Insecta
- Order: Hymenoptera
- Suborder: Symphyta
- Family: Tenthredinidae
- Subfamily: Blennocampinae
- Tribe: Phymatocerini

= Phymatocerini =

Tribe of sawflies

Phymatocerini is a tribe of common sawflies in the family Tenthredinidae.

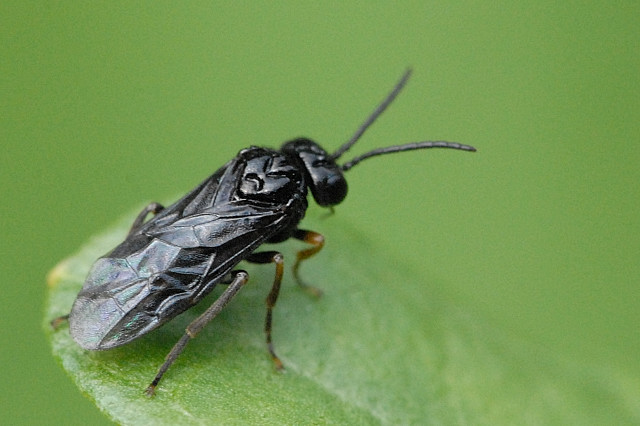
Stethomostus fuliginosus

== Genera ==
These genera belong to the tribe Phymatocerini:

- Ceratulus Macgillivray, 1908^{g b}
- Eutomostethus Enslin, 1914^{g b}
- Monophadnus Hartig, 1837^{g b}
- Niea Wei, 1998
- Paracharactus MacGillivray, 1908^{g b}
- Phymatocera Dahlbom, 1835^{g b}
- Rhadinoceraea Konow, 1886^{g b}
- Stethomostus Benson, 1939^{g b}

Data sources: i = ITIS, c = Catalogue of Life, g = GBIF, b = Bugguide.net
