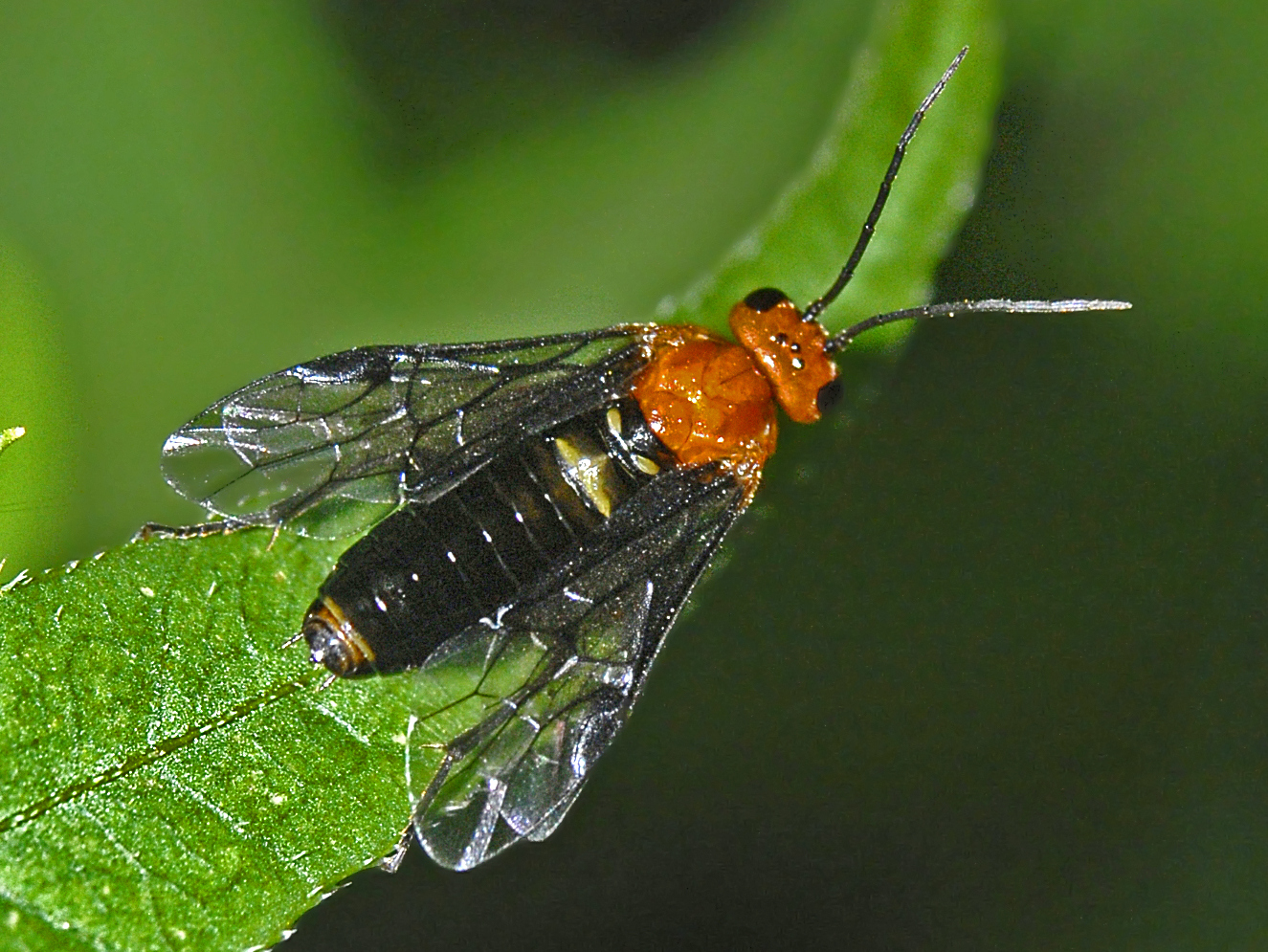
- Hemichroa australis

Scientific classification
- Domain: Eukaryota
- Kingdom: Animalia
- Phylum: Arthropoda
- Class: Insecta
- Order: Hymenoptera
- Suborder: Symphyta
- Superfamily: Tenthredinoidea
- Family: Tenthredinidae
- Subfamily: Nematinae

= Nematinae =

Subfamily of sawflies

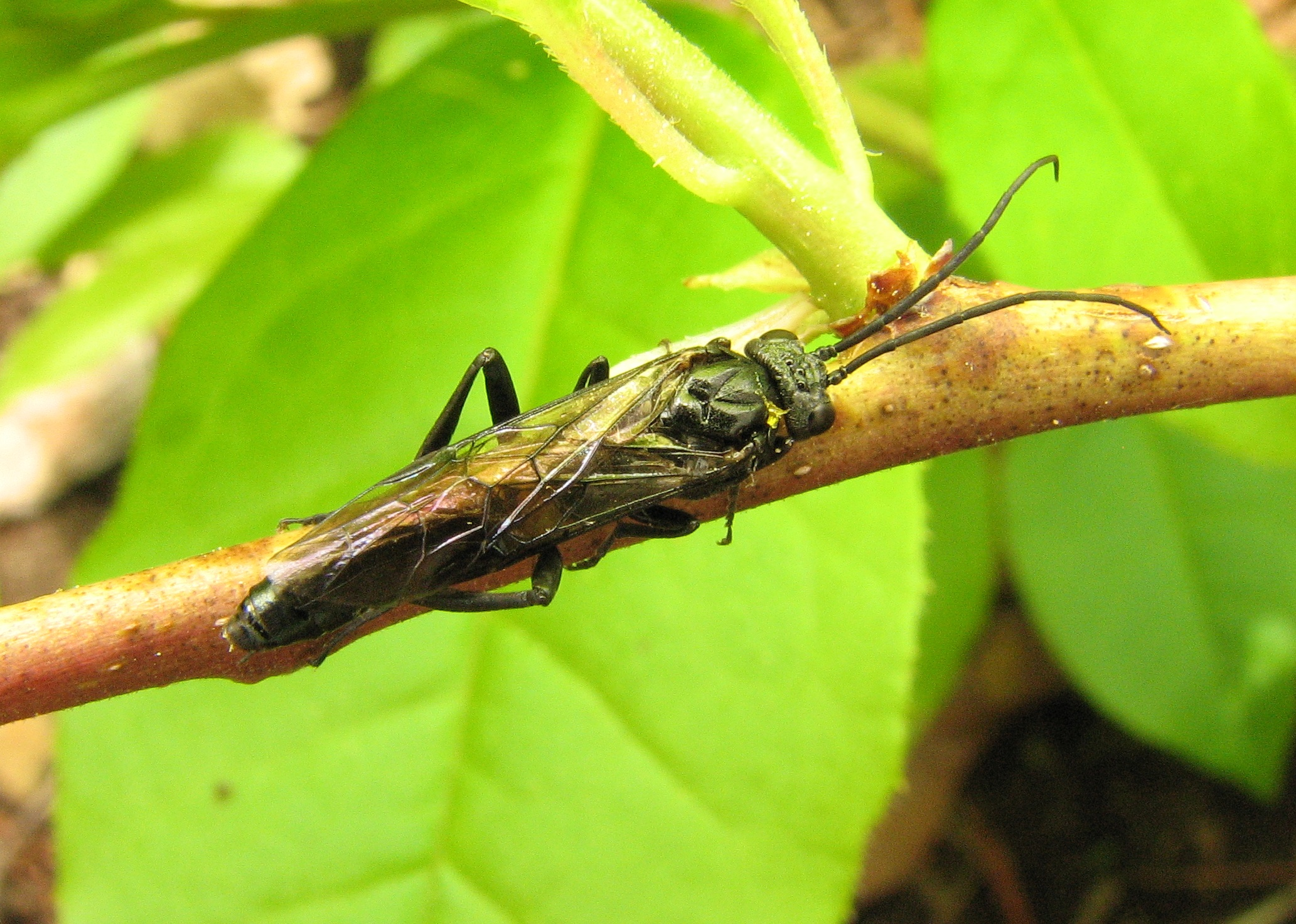
Nematus abbotii

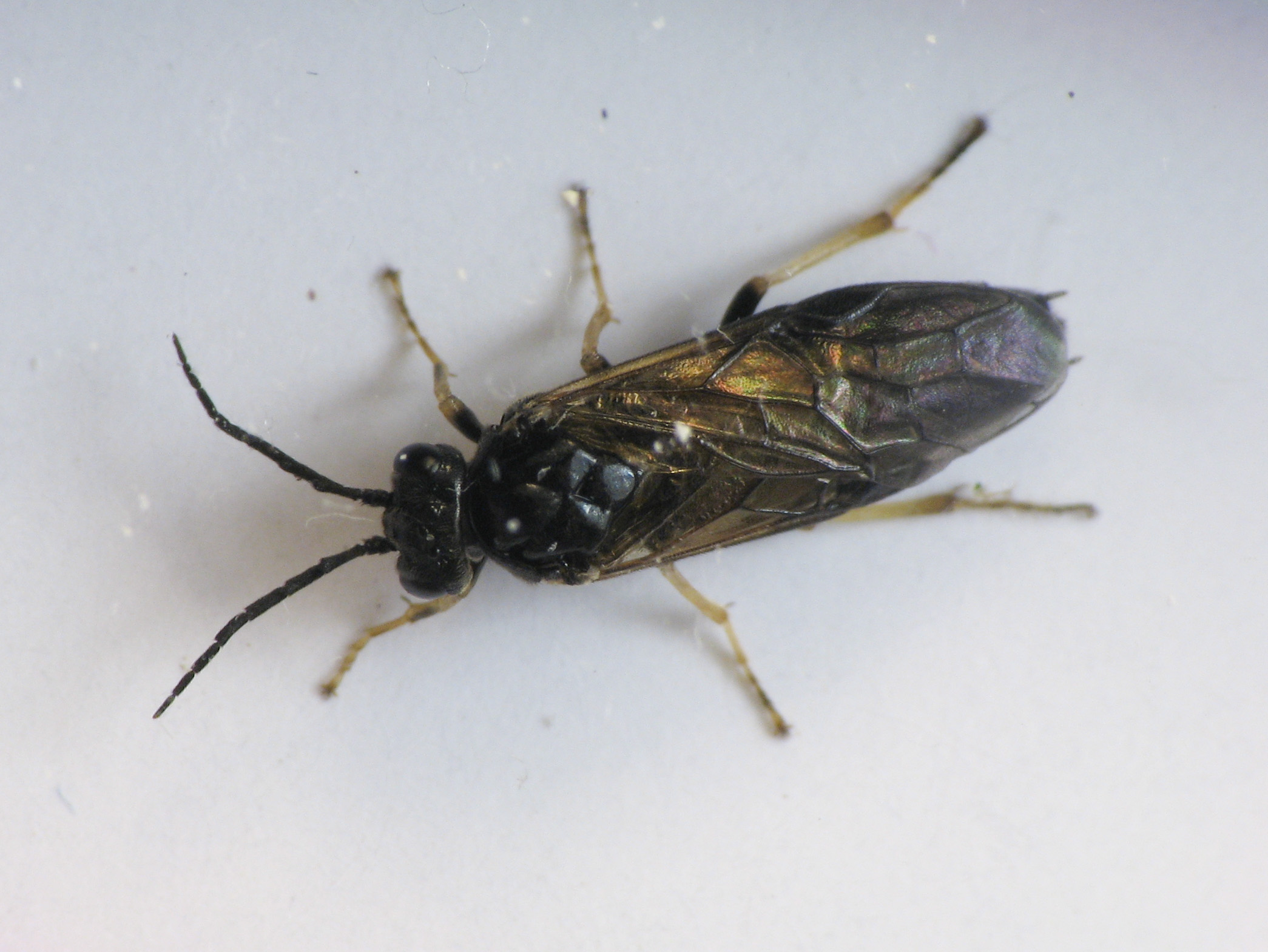
Cladius difformis female

Nematinae is a subfamily of sawflies belonging to the family Tenthredinidae. It contains over 1250 described species in ~40 genera. Members of this subfamily feed on a wide range of plants (over twenty plant families have been recorded as hosts) and employ a wide range of feeding habits, both internally and externally, on their host plants.

Most groups of insects tend to have maximum numbers of species in the tropics and decrease towards the poles. The Nematinae reverse this trend, with the highest number probably occurring in the boreal forest zone. The reason is not fully understood but could be because of the abundance of species of willow (Salix species) in the region. In 2014, species feeding on willow, in the genera Eupontania, Phyllocolpa, Pontania and Tubpontania, were placed in the genus Euura, reflecting advances in the understanding of their phylogeny.

== Genera ==
Genera include:

- Adelomos Ross, 1935
- Anhoplocampa Wei, 1998
- Anoplonyx Marlatt, 1896
- Armenocampus Zinovjev, 2000
- Caulocampus Rohwer, 1912
- Cladius Illiger, 1807
- Craterocercus Rohwer, 1911
- Dinematus Lacourt, 2006
- Dineura Dahlbom, 1835
- Endophytus Hering, 1934
- Euura Newman, 1837
- Fagineura Vikberg & Zinovjev, 2000
- Fallocampus Wong, 1977
- Hemichroa Stephens, 1835
- Hoplocampa Hartig, 1837
- Katsujia Togashi, 1964
- Kerita Ross, 1937
- Megadineura Malaise, 1931
- Mesoneura Hartig, 1837
- Monocellicampa Wei, 1998
- Moricella Rohwer, 1916
- Nematinus Rohwer, 1911
- Nematus Panzer, 1801 (willow sawflies)
- Neodineura Taeger, 1989
- Nescianeura Lacourt, 2006
- Pachynematus Konow, 1890
- Platycampus Schiødte, 1839
- Pristiphora Latreille, 1810
- Pseudodineura Konow, 1885
- Renonerva Wei & Nie, 1998
- Stauronematus Benson, 1953
- Susana Rohwer & Middleton, 1932
- Zhuangzhoua Liu, Niu & Wei 2017
- † Driocampus Zhang & Zhang, 1990
- † Emprionopsis Zhang Junfeng, Sun Bo & Zhang Xiyu, 1994
- † Eohemichroa Zhelochovtzev & Rasnitsyn, 1973
- † Florissantinus Zhelochovtzev & Rasnitsyn, 1973
- † Leptocampus Zhang Junfeng, Sun Bo & Zhang Xiyu, 1994
- † Phthonocampus Zhang Junfeng, Sun Bo & Zhang Xiyu, 1994
