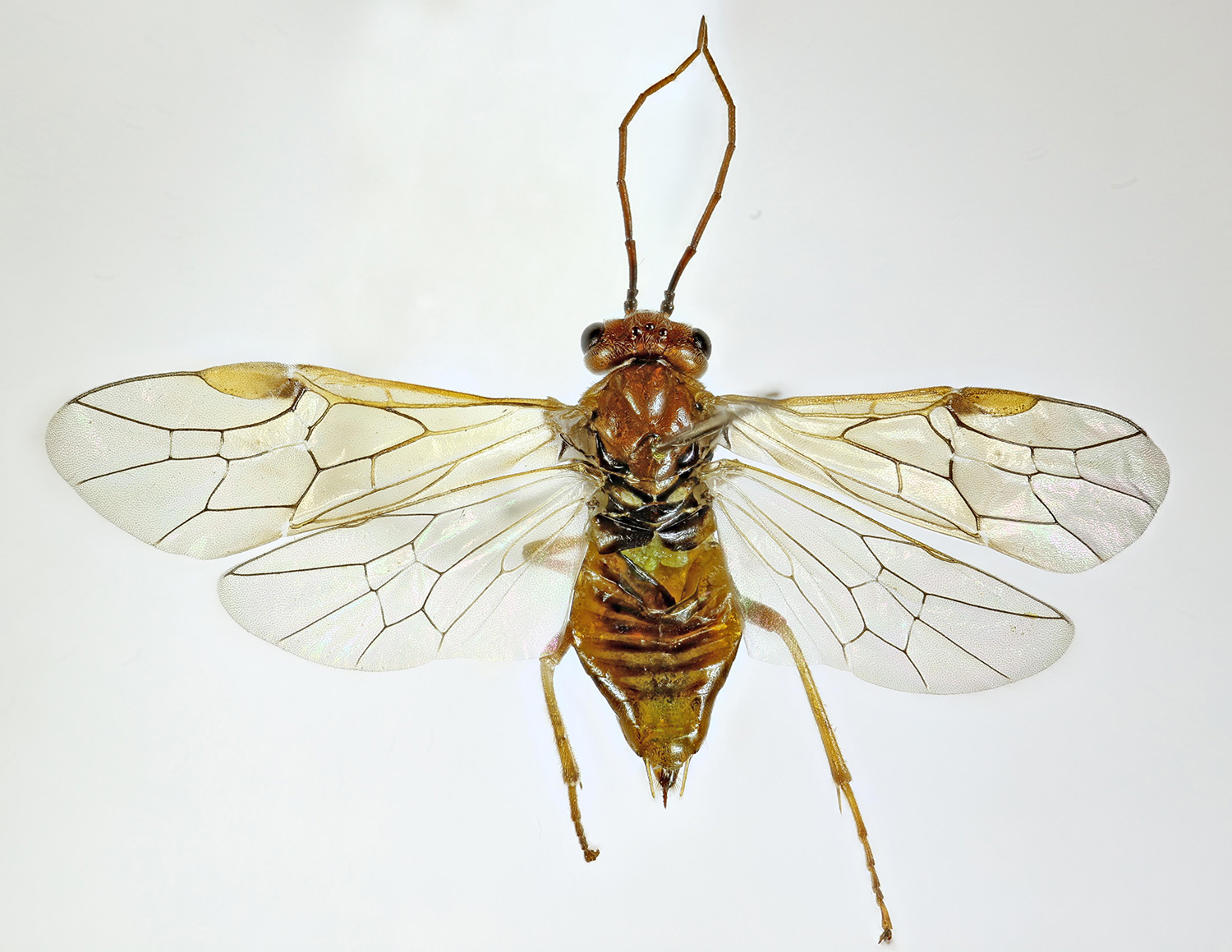
- Nematinus acuminatus, Trawscoed, North Wales

Scientific classification
- Domain: Eukaryota
- Kingdom: Animalia
- Phylum: Arthropoda
- Class: Insecta
- Order: Hymenoptera
- Suborder: Symphyta
- Family: Tenthredinidae
- Genus: Nematinus
- Species: N. acuminatus

Binomial name
- Nematinus acuminatus (Thomson, 1871)

= Nematinus acuminatus =

Species of sawfly

Nematinus acuminatus is a Palearctic species of sawfly.
