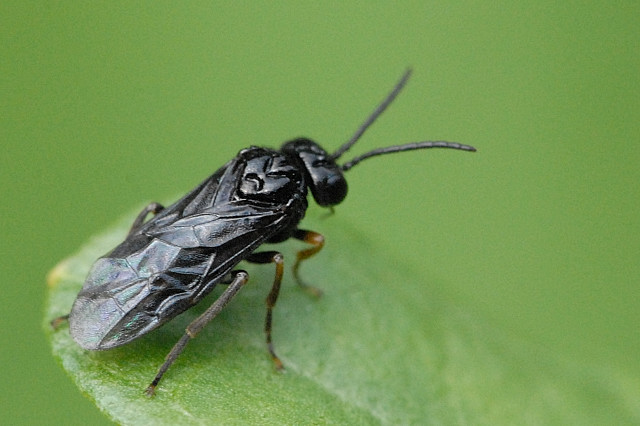

Scientific classification
- Domain: Eukaryota
- Kingdom: Animalia
- Phylum: Arthropoda
- Class: Insecta
- Order: Hymenoptera
- Suborder: Symphyta
- Family: Tenthredinidae
- Genus: Stethomostus
- Species: S. fuliginosus

Binomial name
- Stethomostus fuliginosus (Schrank, 1781)

= Stethomostus fuliginosus =

Species of sawfly

Stethomostus fuliginosus is a species of common sawfly in the family Tenthredinidae.
