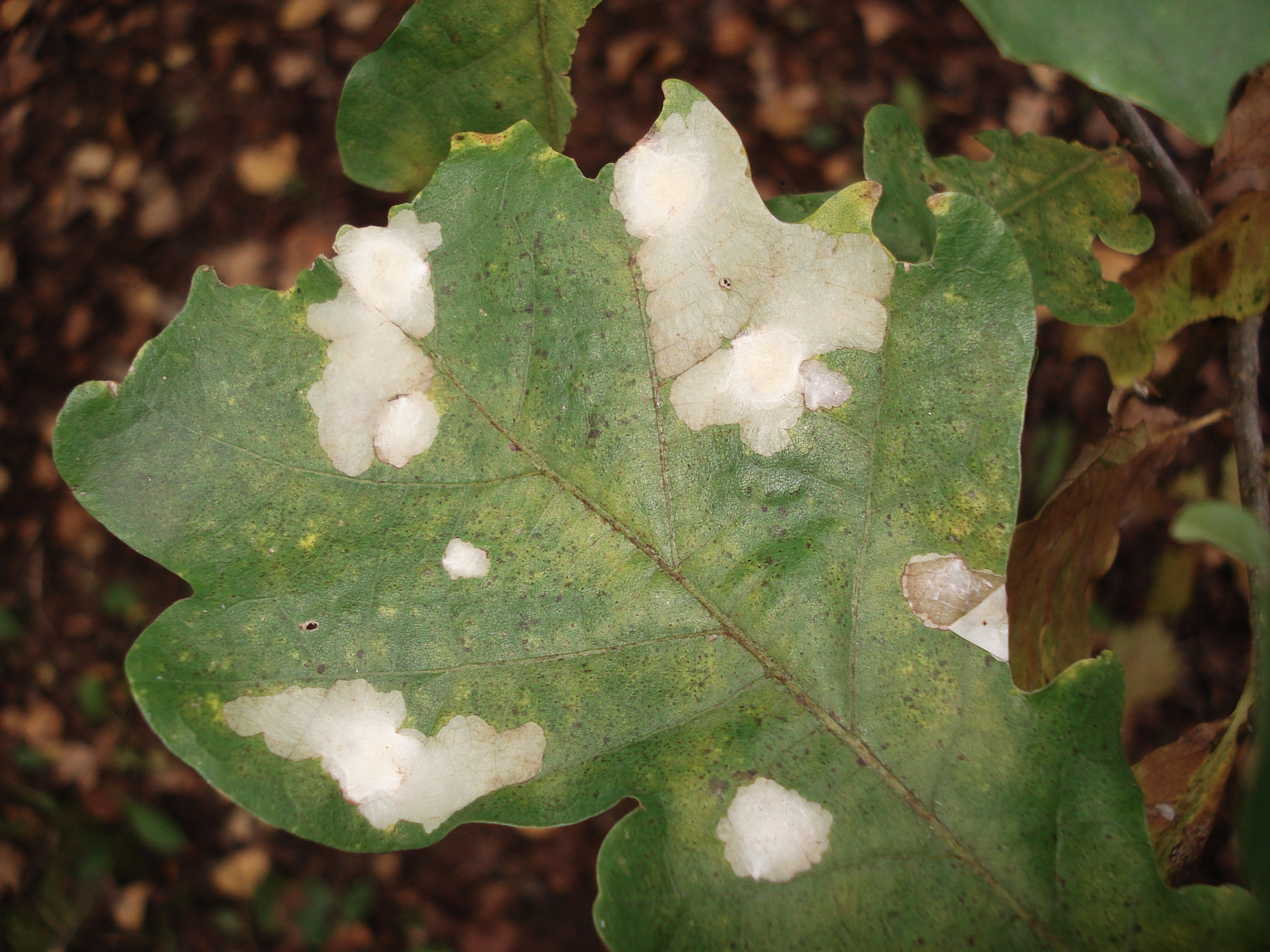
- Profenusa pygmaea leafmines Latvia

Scientific classification
- Domain: Eukaryota
- Kingdom: Animalia
- Phylum: Arthropoda
- Class: Insecta
- Order: Hymenoptera
- Suborder: Symphyta
- Family: Tenthredinidae
- Genus: Profenusa
- Species: P. pygmaea

Binomial name
- Profenusa pygmaea (Klug, 1816)

= Profenusa pygmaea =

Species of sawfly

Profenusa pygmaea is a Palearctic species of sawfly.
