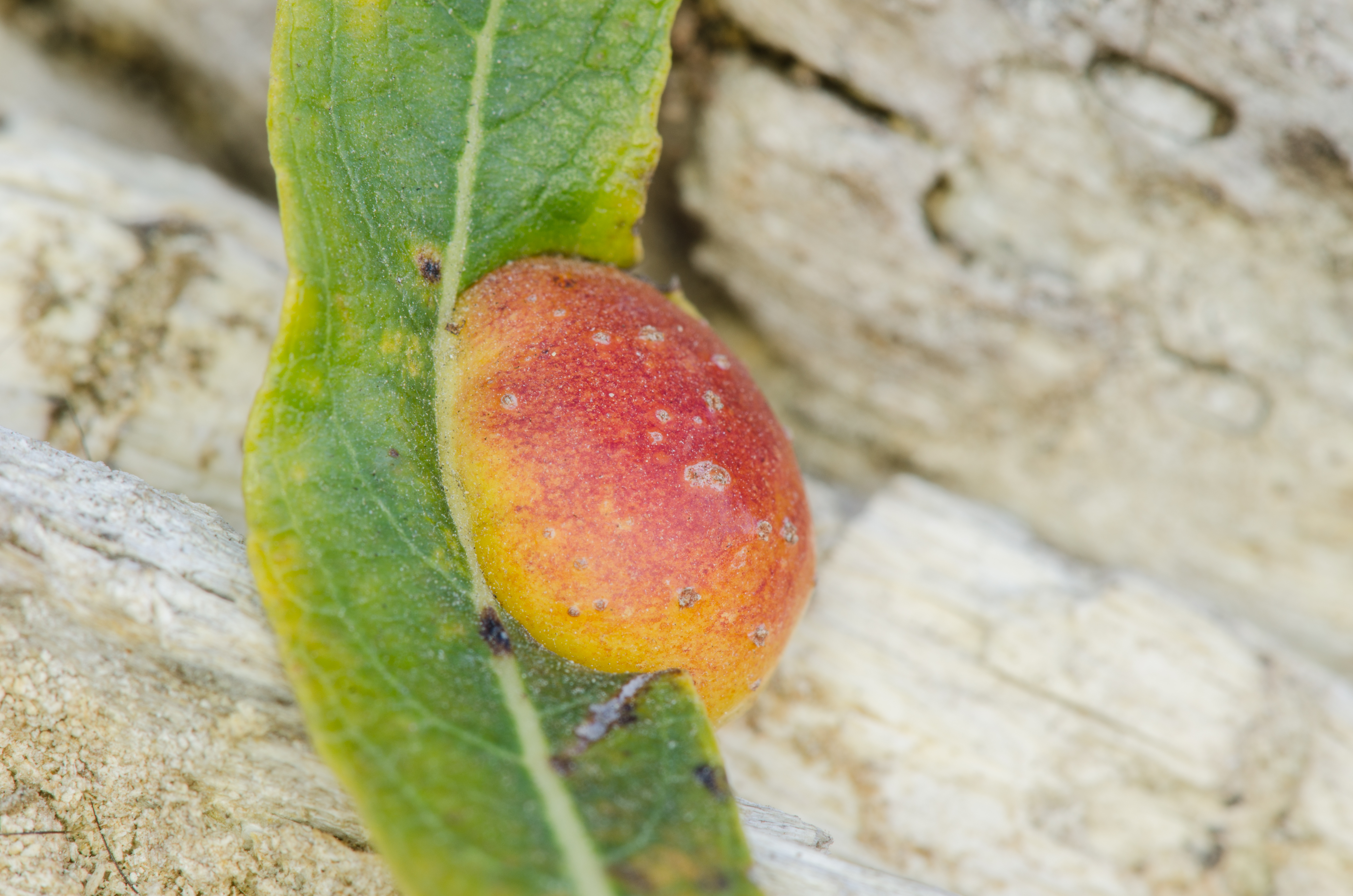
- Euura californica gall, California

Scientific classification
- Domain: Eukaryota
- Kingdom: Animalia
- Phylum: Arthropoda
- Class: Insecta
- Order: Hymenoptera
- Suborder: Symphyta
- Family: Tenthredinidae
- Subfamily: Nematinae
- Genus: Euura
- Species: E. californica

Binomial name
- Euura californica Marlatt

Synonyms
- Pontania californica

= Euura californica =

Species of sawfly

Euura californica, generally known as the willow apple gall sawfly, is a species of common sawfly in the family Tenthredinidae. The sawfly lays eggs within arroyo willow leaves; the gall that develops around the eggs serves as an insect nursery. At maturity, adult sawflies create an exit hole in the gall from which they emerge. This sawfly "breeds year-round, producing as many as six generations" in certain locations.
