= Harpiphorus =

Scientific classification
- Domain: Eukaryota
- Kingdom: Animalia
- Phylum: Arthropoda
- Class: Insecta
- Order: Hymenoptera
- Suborder: Symphyta
- Family: Tenthredinidae
- Genus: Harpiphorus; Hartig, 1837

Genus of insects

Harpiphorus is a genus of insects belonging to the family Tenthredinidae.

The species of this genus are found in Europe.

Species:

- Harpiphorus intermedius Dyar
- Harpiphorus lepidus (Klug, 1818)
