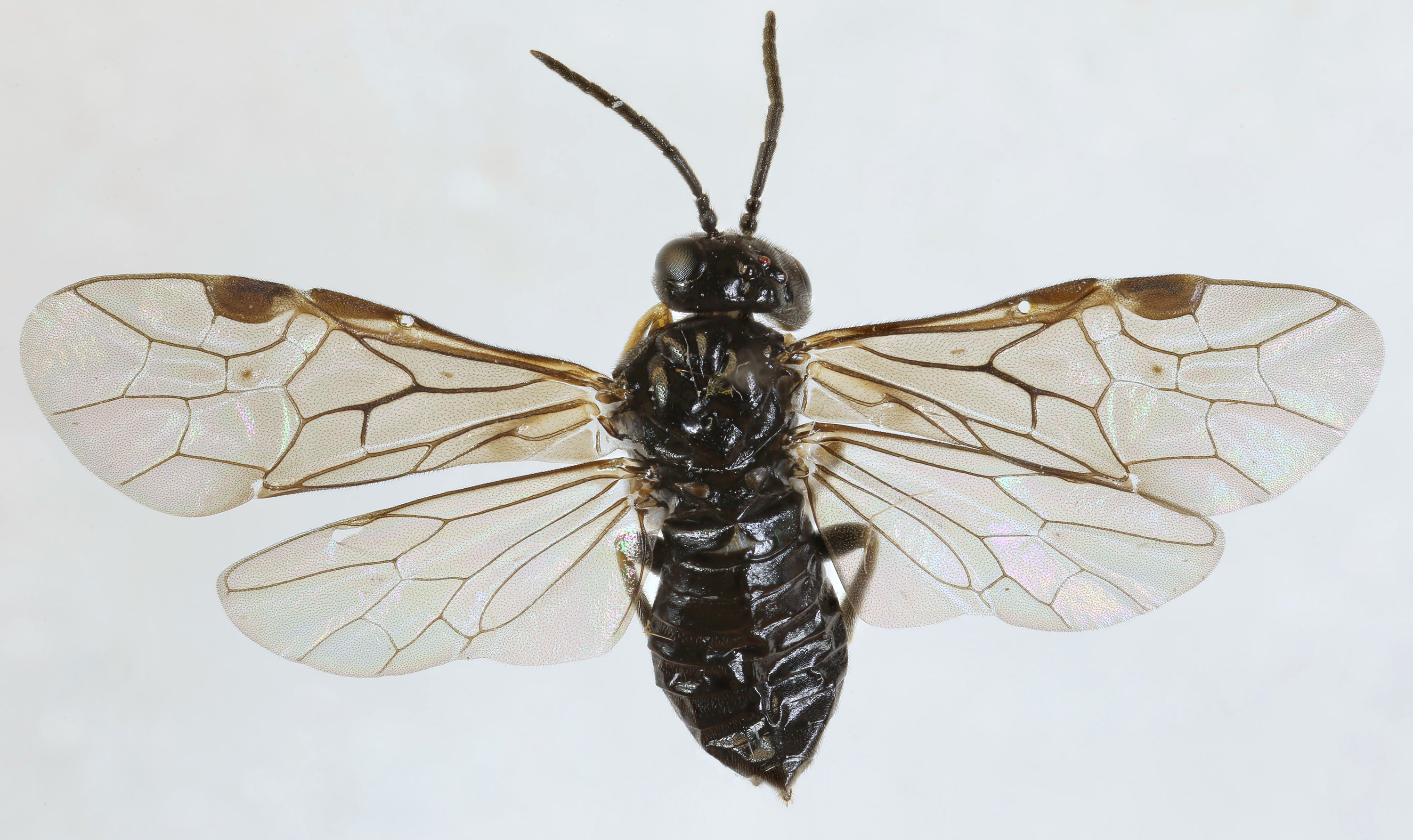

Scientific classification
- Domain: Eukaryota
- Kingdom: Animalia
- Phylum: Arthropoda
- Class: Insecta
- Order: Hymenoptera
- Suborder: Symphyta
- Family: Tenthredinidae
- Genus: Endelomyia
- Species: E. aethiops

Binomial name
- Endelomyia aethiops (Fabricius, 1781)

= Endelomyia aethiops =

Species of sawfly

Endelomyia aethiops, the roseslug, is a species of common sawfly in the family Tenthredinidae.
