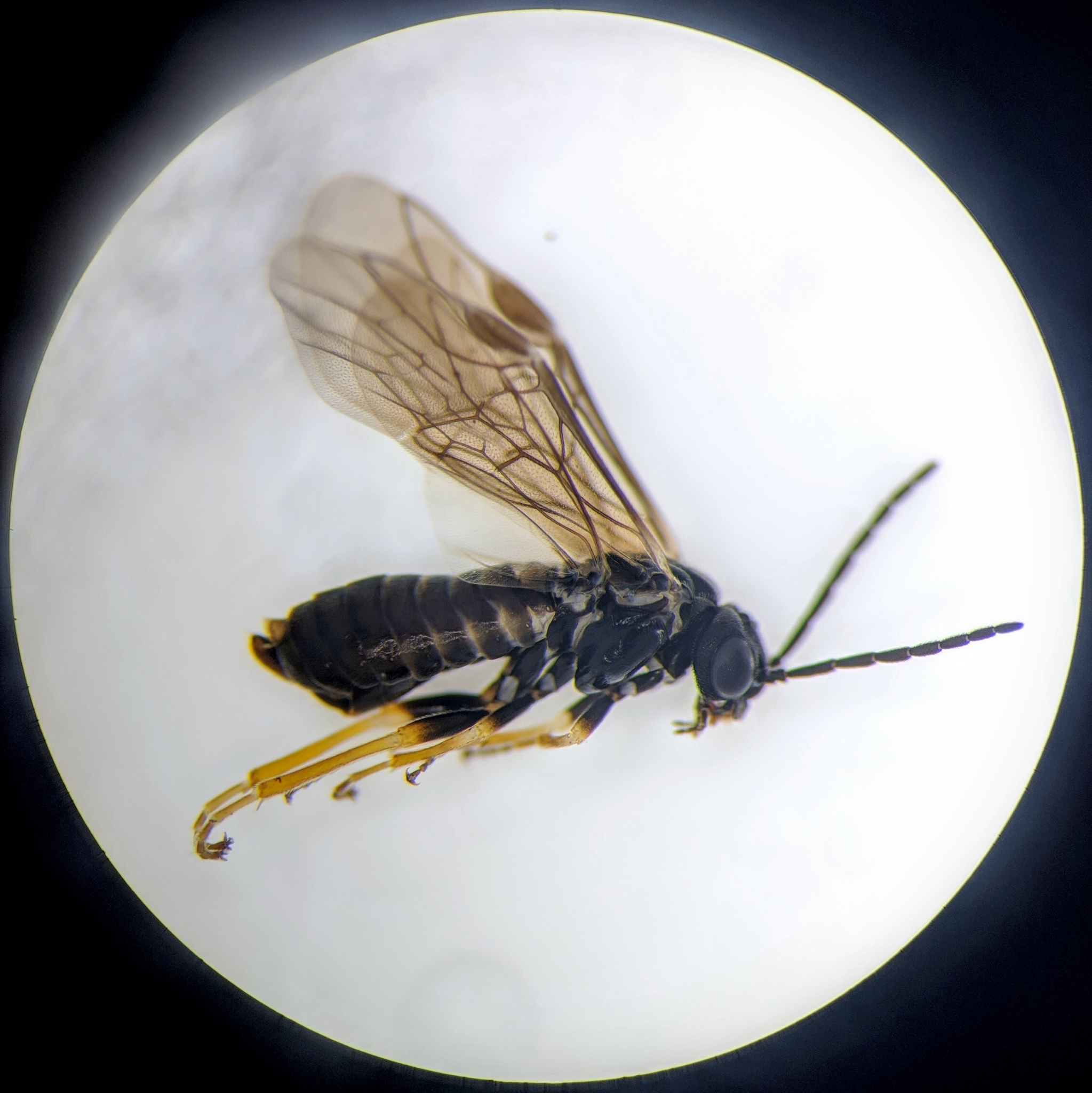

Scientific classification
- Kingdom: Animalia
- Phylum: Arthropoda
- Class: Insecta
- Order: Hymenoptera
- Suborder: Symphyta
- Family: Tenthredinidae
- Genus: Pseudodineura
- Species: P. fuscula

Binomial name
- Pseudodineura fuscula (Klug, 1816)

= Pseudodineura fuscula =

Species of sawfly

Pseudodineura fuscula is a Palearctic species of sawfly.
