= Anoplonyx =

Scientific classification
- Domain: Eukaryota
- Kingdom: Animalia
- Phylum: Arthropoda
- Class: Insecta
- Order: Hymenoptera
- Suborder: Symphyta
- Family: Tenthredinidae
- Subfamily: Nematinae
- Tribe: Nematini
- Genus: Anoplonyx; Marlatt, 1896

Genus of sawflies

Anoplonyx is a genus of insect belonging to the family Tenthredinidae.

The genus was first described by Marlatt in 1896.

Species:

- Anoplonyx destructor
