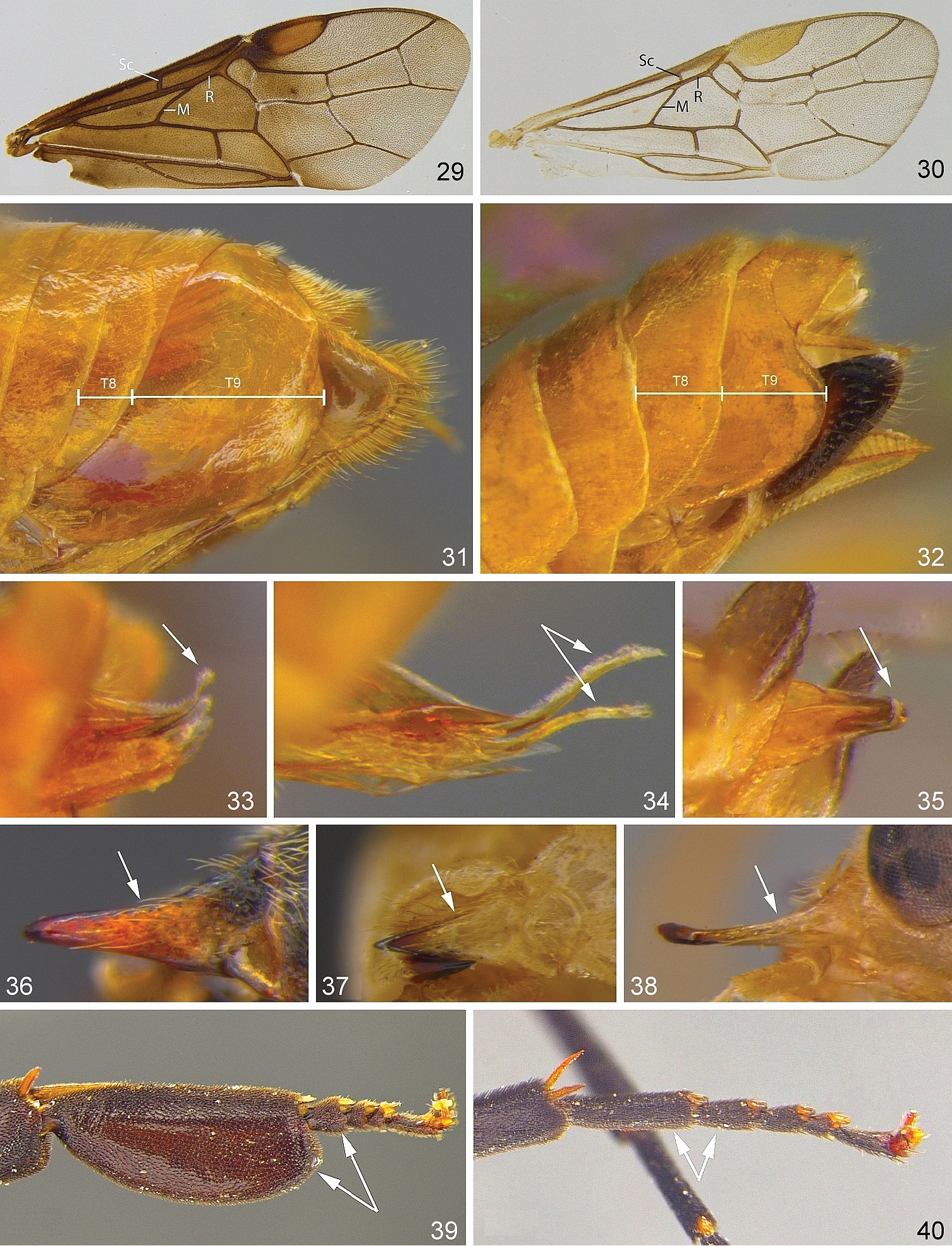

Scientific classification
- Kingdom: Animalia
- Phylum: Arthropoda
- Clade: Pancrustacea
- Class: Insecta
- Order: Hymenoptera
- Suborder: Symphyta
- Family: Tenthredinidae
- Subfamily: Nematinae
- Genus: Nematinus; Rohwer, 1911

= Nematinus =

Genus of sawflies

Nematinus is a genus of sawflies belonging to the family Tenthredinidae.

The species of this genus are found in Europe, Easternmost Asia and North America.

Species:

- Nematinus acuminatus (Thomson, 1871)
- Nematinus caledonicus (Cameron, 1882) - rarely found in Central Europe, including Slovakia
- Nematinus bilineatus (Klug, 1819)
- Nematinus ochreatus (Rohwer, 1910) - found in North America
- Nematinus parsebenus Smith 1986
- Nematinus pontanioides (Marlatt, 1896) - found in Alaska
- Nematinus unicolor (Dyar, 1895)
