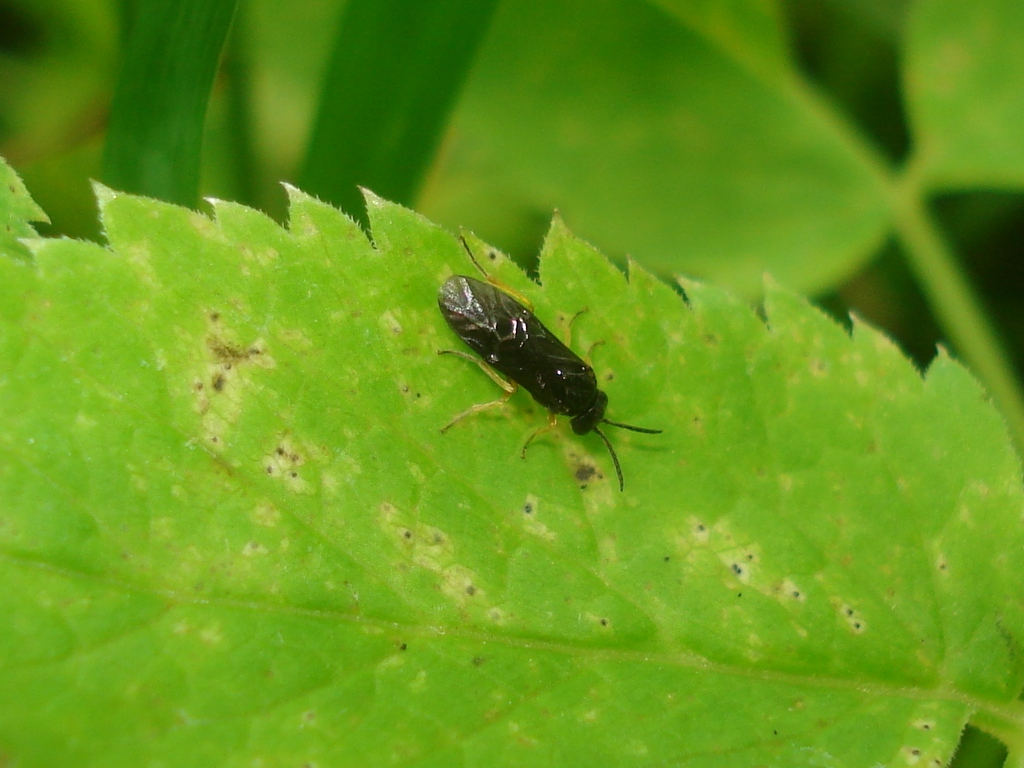
- Profenusa thomsoni

Scientific classification
- Domain: Eukaryota
- Kingdom: Animalia
- Phylum: Arthropoda
- Class: Insecta
- Order: Hymenoptera
- Suborder: Symphyta
- Family: Tenthredinidae
- Subfamily: Heterarthrinae
- Genus: Profenusa; MacGillivray, 1914

= Profenusa =

Genus of sawflies

Profenusa is a genus of sawflies belonging to the family Tenthredinidae.

Species:

- Profenusa pygmaea
- Profenusa thomsoni
