= Heptamelus =

Scientific classification
- Domain: Eukaryota
- Kingdom: Animalia
- Phylum: Arthropoda
- Class: Insecta
- Order: Hymenoptera
- Suborder: Symphyta
- Family: Tenthredinidae
- Genus: Heptamelus; Haliday, 1855

Genus of sawflies

Heptamelus is a genus of sawflies belonging to the family Tenthredinidae.

The species of this genus are found in Europe and Japan. Larvae feed within the petioles of ferns.

Species:

- Heptamelus dahlbomi (Thomson, 1870)
- Heptamelus ochroleucus (Stephens, 1835)
