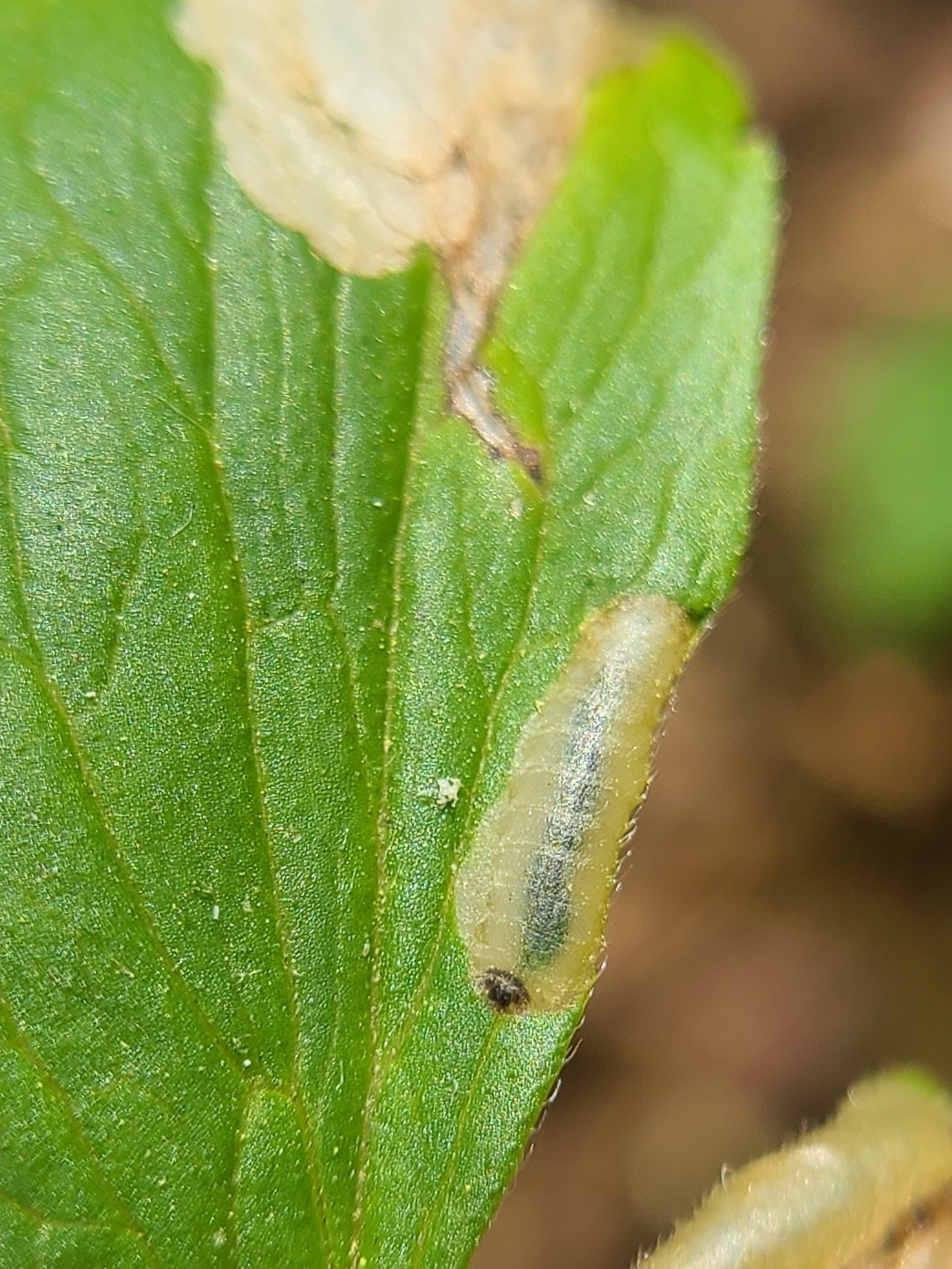
- Pseudodineura parva larva and leaf damage

Scientific classification
- Kingdom: Animalia
- Phylum: Arthropoda
- Class: Insecta
- Order: Hymenoptera
- Suborder: Symphyta
- Family: Tenthredinidae
- Subfamily: Nematinae
- Genus: Pseudodineura; Konow, 1885

= Pseudodineura =

Genus of sawflies

Pseudodineura is a genus of sawflies belonging to the family Tenthredinidae.

The species of this genus are found in Europe and North America.

== Species ==
The following species are recognised in the genus Pseudodineura:

- Pseudodineura clematidis (Hering, 1932)
- Pseudodineura clematidisrectae (Hering, 1935)
- Pseudodineura enslini (Hering, 1923)
- Pseudodineura epimedium
- Pseudodineura fuscula
- Pseudodineura kasatochi Smith, 2010
- Pseudodineura lehosa
- Pseudodineura rileda
