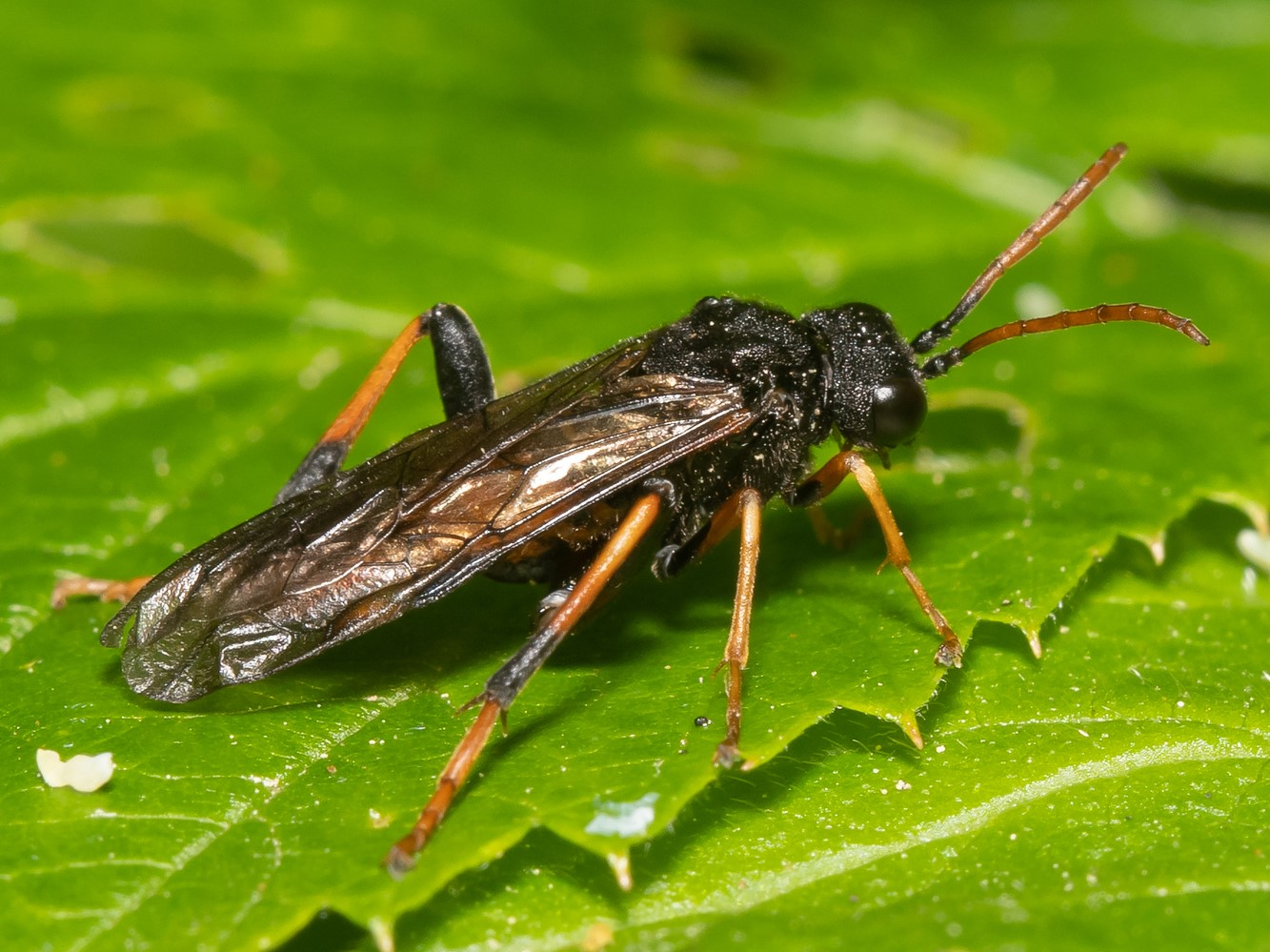
- Siobla sturmii

Scientific classification
- Domain: Eukaryota
- Kingdom: Animalia
- Phylum: Arthropoda
- Class: Insecta
- Order: Hymenoptera
- Suborder: Symphyta
- Family: Tenthredinidae
- Subfamily: Sioblinae
- Genus: Siobla; Cameron, 1877

Synonyms
- Encarsioneura Konow, 1890; Megasiobla Dovnar-Zapolskij, 1930

= Siobla =

Genus of sawflies

Siobla is a genus of insects belonging to the family Sioblinae.

== Species ==
The following species are recognised in the genus Siobla:

- Siobla acutiscutella Wei & Nie, 1999
- Siobla acutiserrula Niu & Wei, 2010
- Siobla annulicornis Niu & Wei, 2010
- Siobla apicalis Takeuchi, 1929
- Siobla atra Malaise, 1945
- Siobla dian Niu & Wei
- Siobla femorata
- Siobla ferox (Smith, 1874) Smith, 1874
- Siobla formosana Takeuchi, 1927
- Siobla fulva Takeuchi, 1927
- Siobla fumipennis Malaise, 1945
- Siobla hirasana Takeuchi, 1929
- Siobla infuscata Saini, Singh, Singh & Singh, 1985
- Siobla insularis Malaise, 1945
- Siobla japonica Shinohara, Wei & Niu
- Siobla jiangi Niu & Wei
- Siobla jucunda (Mocsáry, 1909) Mocsary, 1909
- Siobla leucocincta Niu & Wei, 2010
- Siobla listoni Niu & Wei, 2012
- Siobla metallica Takeuchi, 1929
- Siobla nigricruris Lee & Ryu, 1996
- Siobla obtusiscutellata Niu & Wei
- Siobla parallela Niu & Wei
- Siobla pulchra Shinohara, Wei & Niu
- Siobla reticulatia Wei, 1998
- Siobla ruficornis (Gimmerthal, 1834)
- Siobla rufipes
- Siobla rufopropodea Wei, 1998
- Siobla semipicta Malaise, 1945
- Siobla sheni Wei, 2002
- Siobla spec Malaise, 1945
- Siobla sturmii (Klug, 1817)
- Siobla szechuanica Malaise, 1934
- Siobla taiwanica Malaise, 1945
- Siobla takeuchii Shinohara, Wei & Niu, 2013
- Siobla turneri
- Siobla weiweii Niu & Wei
- Siobla weni Niu & Wei, 2010
- Siobla yunanensis
- Siobla zenaida (Dovnar-Zapolskij, 1930)
- Siobla zhangi Wei, 2005
- Siobla zuoae Wei, 2005
