= Hinatara =

Scientific classification
- Domain: Eukaryota
- Kingdom: Animalia
- Phylum: Arthropoda
- Class: Insecta
- Order: Hymenoptera
- Suborder: Symphyta
- Family: Tenthredinidae
- Genus: Hinatara; Benson, 1936

Genus of insects

Hinatara is a genus of insects belonging to the family Tenthredinidae.

Species:

- Hinatara excisa
- Hinatara nigripes
- Hinatara recta
