= Monardis =

Scientific classification
- Domain: Eukaryota
- Kingdom: Animalia
- Phylum: Arthropoda
- Class: Insecta
- Order: Hymenoptera
- Suborder: Symphyta
- Family: Tenthredinidae
- Genus: Monardis; Enslin, 1914

Genus of sawflies

Monardis is a genus of sawflies belonging to the family Tenthredinidae.

Species:

- Monardis plana
