= Brachythops =

Scientific classification
- Domain: Eukaryota
- Kingdom: Animalia
- Phylum: Arthropoda
- Class: Insecta
- Order: Hymenoptera
- Suborder: Symphyta
- Family: Tenthredinidae
- Genus: Brachythops; Haliday, 1839

Genus of sawflies

Brachythops is a genus of insects belonging to the family Tenthredinidae.

The genus was first described by Alexander Henry Haliday in 1839.

The species of this genus are found in Europe and North America.

Species:

- Brachythops flavens (Klug, 1816)
