= Hoplocampoides =

Scientific classification
- Domain: Eukaryota
- Kingdom: Animalia
- Phylum: Arthropoda
- Class: Insecta
- Order: Hymenoptera
- Suborder: Symphyta
- Family: Tenthredinidae
- Genus: Hoplocampoides; Enslin, 1914

Genus of sawflies

Hoplocampoides is a genus of sawflies belonging to the family Tenthredinidae.

Species:

- Hoplocampoides longiserrus
- Hoplocampoides xylostei
