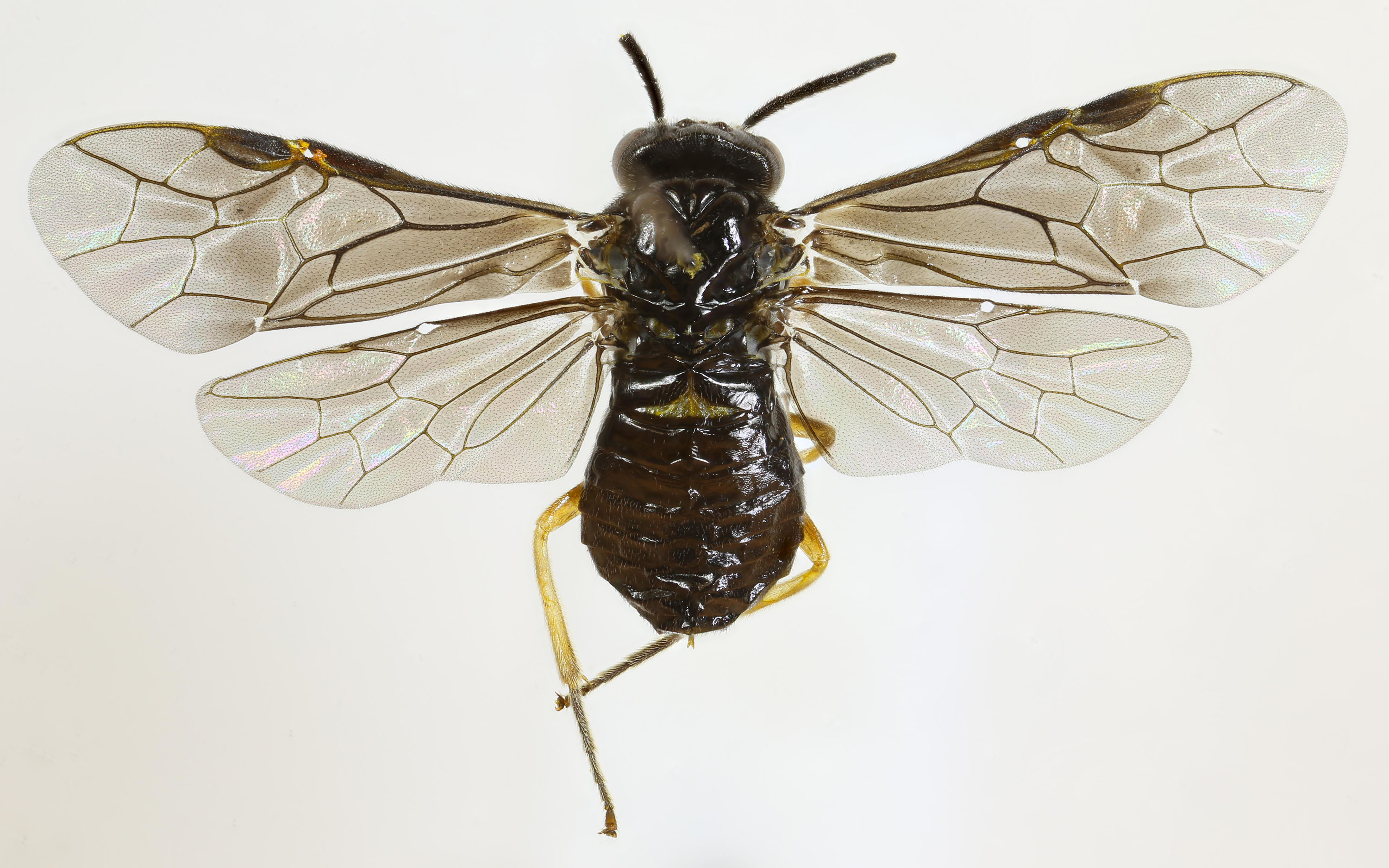
- Nesoselandria morio. Mounted specimen

Scientific classification
- Kingdom: Animalia
- Phylum: Arthropoda
- Class: Insecta
- Order: Hymenoptera
- Suborder: Symphyta
- Family: Tenthredinidae
- Genus: Nesoseladria; Rohwer, 1910
- Species: N. morio

Binomial name
- Nesoseladria morio (Fabricius, 1781)

Synonyms
- Dulophanes morio; Tenthredo morio Fabricius, 1781

= Nesoselandria =

Species of sawfly

Nesoselandria morio is a species of sawflies belonging to the family Tenthredinidae subfamily Tenthrediniinae. It is the only species of the genus Nesoselandria.

== Taxonomy ==
Some authors consider Dulophanes morio a valid name and Nesoselandria morio a synonym.

== Distribution ==
This species is present in the Nearctic realm and in most of Europe to Siberia and Japan.

== Description ==
Nesoseladria morio can reach a length of 4.3–4.5 millimetres (0.17–0.18 in). Head, antennae, thorax and abdomen are black. Legs arecompletely yellow-orange, except the basal segment. Wings are darkly infuscate.
