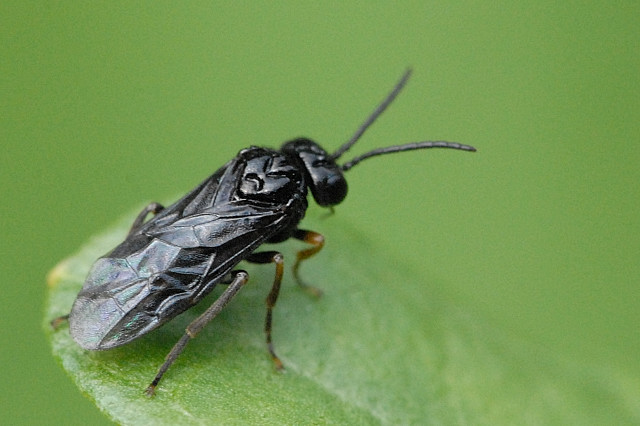
- Stethomostus fuliginosus

Scientific classification
- Domain: Eukaryota
- Kingdom: Animalia
- Phylum: Arthropoda
- Class: Insecta
- Order: Hymenoptera
- Suborder: Symphyta
- Family: Tenthredinidae
- Tribe: Phymatocerini
- Genus: Stethomostus; Benson, 1939

= Stethomostus =

Genus of sawflies

Stethomostus is a genus of common sawflies in the family Tenthredinidae. There are at least two described species in Stethomostus.

== Species ==
These two species belong to the genus Stethomostus:

- Stethomostus fuliginosus (Schrank, 1781)^{g b}
- Stethomostus funereus (Klug, 1816)^{g}

Data sources: i = ITIS, c = Catalogue of Life, g = GBIF, b = Bugguide.net
