= Monophadnus =

Scientific classification
- Kingdom: Animalia
- Phylum: Arthropoda
- Class: Insecta
- Order: Hymenoptera
- Suborder: Symphyta
- Family: Tenthredinidae
- Genus: Monophadnus; Hartig, 1837

Genus of sawflies

Monophadnus is a genus of sawflies belonging to the family Tenthredinidae.

Species:

- Monophadnus alpicola
- Monophadnus latus
- Monophadnus monticola
- Monophadnus pallescens
- Monophadnus spinolae
