= Pikonema =

Scientific classification
- Domain: Eukaryota
- Kingdom: Animalia
- Phylum: Arthropoda
- Class: Insecta
- Order: Hymenoptera
- Suborder: Symphyta
- Family: Tenthredinidae
- Genus: Pikonema; Ross, 1937

Genus of insects

Pikonema is a genus of sawflies belonging to the family Tenthredinidae.

The species of this genus are found in Europe and North America.

Species:

- Pikonema alaskensis (Rohwer)
- Pikonema dimmockii (Cresson)
- Pikonema fujiense Zinovjev, 1993
- Pikonema insigne (Hartig, 1840)
