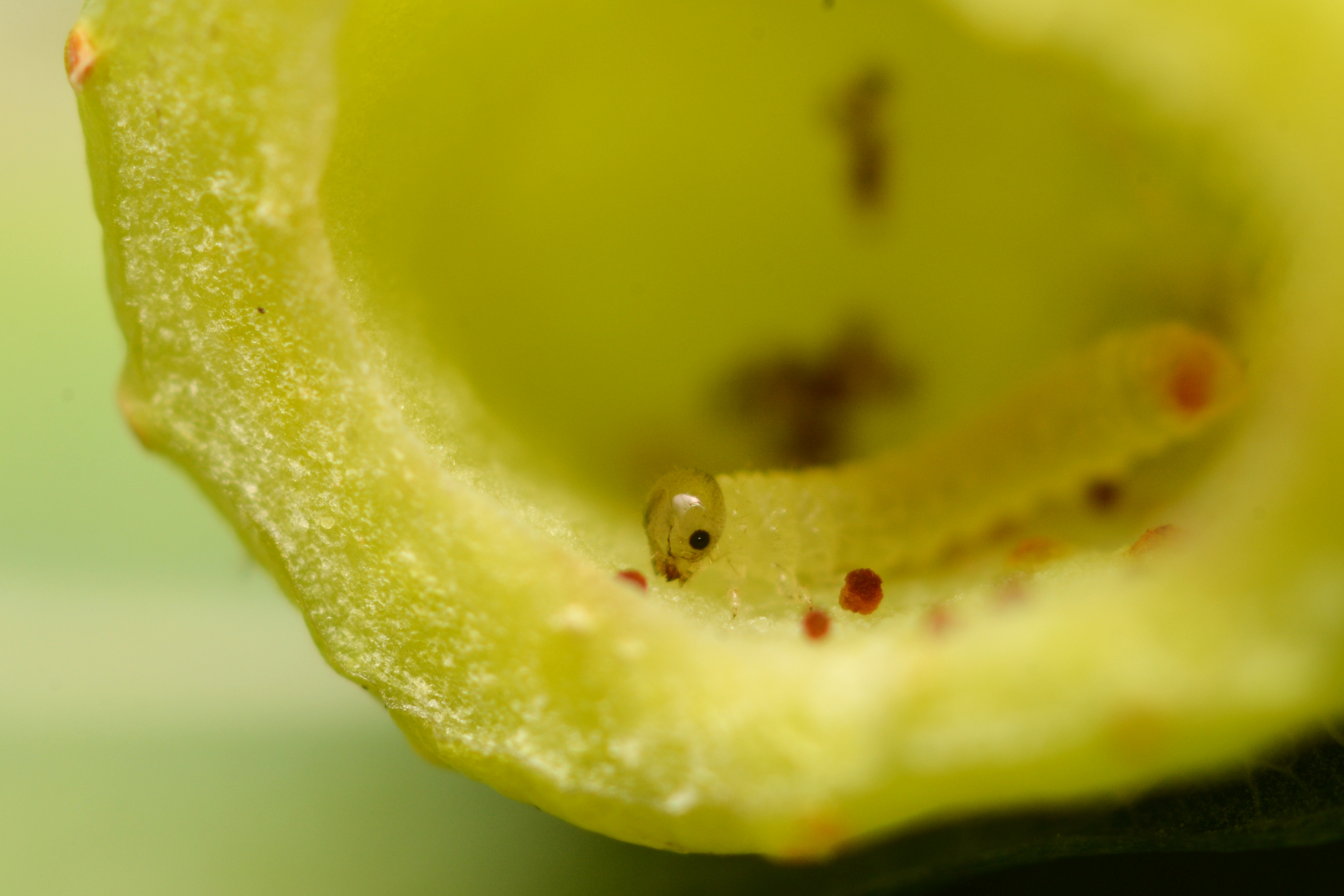
- Pontania viminalis

Scientific classification
- Domain: Eukaryota
- Kingdom: Animalia
- Phylum: Arthropoda
- Class: Insecta
- Order: Hymenoptera
- Suborder: Symphyta
- Family: Tenthredinidae
- Genus: Pontania; Costa, 1852

= Pontania =

Genus of sawflies

Pontania is a genus of common sawflies in the family Tenthredinidae. There are more than 80 described species in Pontania.

== Species ==
These 89 species belong to the genus Pontania:

- Pontania acuminata Marlatt
- Pontania acutifoliae Zinovjev, 1985
- Pontania agama Rohwer
- Pontania algida Benson, 1941
- Pontania alpinae (Vikberg, 2003)
- Pontania amentivora Rohwer
- Pontania anomaloptera (Foerster, 1854)
- Pontania aquilonis Benson, 1941
- Pontania arbusculae Benson, 1941
- Pontania arcticornis Konow, 1904
- Pontania articornis Konow, 1904
- Pontania bastatae Vikberg, 1970
- Pontania bella (Zaddach, 1876)
- Pontania borealis Marlatt
- Pontania brachycarpae Rohwer
- Pontania brevicornis (Foerster, 1854)
- Pontania breviserratae Kopelke, 1989
- Pontania bridgmanii (Cameron, 1883)
- Pontania bruneri Marlatt
- Pontania californica Marlatt
- Pontania collactanea (Foerster, 1854)
- Pontania collectanea (Förster, 1854)
- Pontania consors Marlatt
- Pontania crassicornis Rohwer
- Pontania crassipes (Thomson, 1871)
- Pontania cyrnea Liston, 2005
- Pontania dolichura (Thomson, 1871)
- Pontania elaeagnocola Kopelke, 1994
- Pontania foetidae Kopelke, 1989
- Pontania foveata Rohwer
- Pontania gallarum (Hartig, 1837)
- Pontania glabrifrons Benson, 1960
- Pontania glaucae Kopelke, 1994
- Pontania gracilis Marlatt
- Pontania hastata Vikberg, 1970
- Pontania hastatae Vikberg, 1970
- Pontania helveticae Kopelke, 1986
- Pontania herbaceae (Cameron, 1876)
- Pontania joergenseni Enslin, 1916
- Pontania kriechbaumeri Konow, 1901
- Pontania kukakiana Kincaid
- Pontania lapponicola Kopelke, 1994
- Pontania leavitti Rohwer
- Pontania leucostoma Rohwer
- Pontania lucidae Rohwer
- Pontania maculosa Kopelke, 1989
- Pontania marlatti Ross
- Pontania megacephala Rohwer
- Pontania melanosoma Rohwer
- Pontania montivaga Kopelke, 1991
- Pontania myrsiniticola Kopelke, 1991
- Pontania myrsinticola Kopelke, 1991
- Pontania myrtilloidica Kopelke, 1991
- Pontania nevadensis
- Pontania nigricantis Kopelke, 1986
- Pontania nigrita Marlatt
- Pontania nivalis Vikberg, 1970
- Pontania norvegica Kopelke, 1991
- Pontania nudipectus Vikberg, 1965
- Pontania obscura Kopelke, 2005
- Pontania ora Kincaid
- Pontania pedunculi (Hartig, 1837)
- Pontania peninsularis Kincaid
- Pontania petiolaridis Rohwer
- Pontania populi Marlatt
- Pontania proxima (Lepeletier)
- Pontania proxima (Serville, 1823)
- Pontania pumila Rohwer
- Pontania purpureae (Cameron, 1884)
- Pontania pustulator Forsius, 1923
- Pontania resinicola Marlatt
- Pontania reticulata Malaise, 1920
- Pontania reticulatae Malaise, 1920
- Pontania retusae Benson, 1960
- Pontania robusta Marlatt
- Pontania rotundidentata Zinovjev & Vikberg
- Pontania rugulosa Marlatt
- Pontania saliciscinereae (Retzius, 1783)
- Pontania saliscinereae (Retzius, 1783)
- Pontania samolad Malaise, 1920
- Pontania terminalis Marlatt
- Pontania triandrae Benson, 1941
- Pontania tuberculata (Benson, 1953)
- Pontania tundra Kincaid
- Pontania utensis Rohwer
- Pontania varia Kopelke, 1991
- Pontania vesicator (Bremi, 1849)
- Pontania viminalis (Linnaeus, 1758)
- Pontania virilis Zirngiebl, 1955
