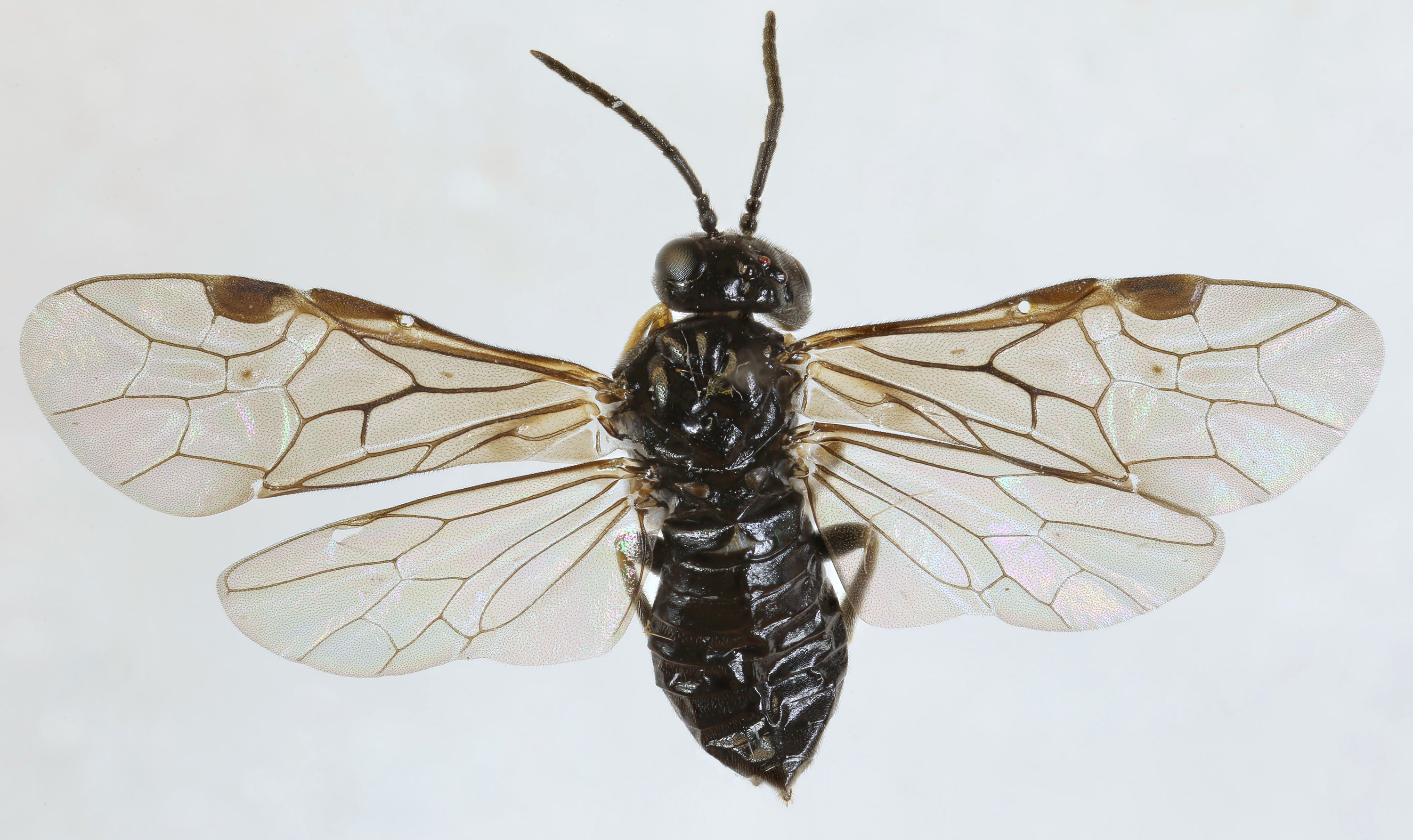
- Endelomyia aethiops

Scientific classification
- Kingdom: Animalia
- Phylum: Arthropoda
- Class: Insecta
- Order: Hymenoptera
- Suborder: Symphyta
- Family: Tenthredinidae
- Genus: Endelomyia; Ashmead, 1898

= Endelomyia =

Genus of sawflies

Endelomyia is a genus of common sawflies in the family Tenthredinidae. There are at least two described species in Endelomyia.

== Species ==
These two species belong to the genus Endelomyia:

- Endelomyia aethiops (Fabricius)^{i c g b} (roseslug)
- Endelomyia filipendulae Lacourt, 1998^{g}

Data sources: i = ITIS, c = Catalogue of Life, g = GBIF, b = Bugguide.net
