= Scolioneura =

Scientific classification
- Kingdom: Animalia
- Phylum: Arthropoda
- Class: Insecta
- Order: Hymenoptera
- Suborder: Symphyta
- Family: Tenthredinidae
- Genus: Scolioneura; Konow, 1890

Genus of sawflies

Scolioneura is a genus of sawflies belonging to the family Tenthredinidae.

The species of this genus are found in Europe and North America.

Species:

- Scolioneura betuleti (Klug, 1816)
- Scolioneura canadensis Marlatt
