= Endophytus =

Scientific classification
- Domain: Eukaryota
- Kingdom: Animalia
- Phylum: Arthropoda
- Class: Insecta
- Order: Hymenoptera
- Suborder: Symphyta
- Family: Tenthredinidae
- Genus: Endophytus; Hering, 1934

Genus of sawflies

Endophytus is a genus of sawflies belonging to the family Tenthredinidae.

The species of this genus are found in Europe.

Species:

- Endophytus anemones (Hering, 1924)
