= Dineura =

Scientific classification
- Kingdom: Animalia
- Phylum: Arthropoda
- Clade: Pancrustacea
- Class: Insecta
- Order: Hymenoptera
- Suborder: Symphyta
- Family: Tenthredinidae
- Genus: Dineura; Dahlbom, 1835

Genus of sawflies

Dineura is a genus of sawflies belonging to the family Tenthredinidae.

The species of this genus are found in Europe, Easternmost Asia and North America.

Species:

- Dineura cockerelli Rohwer, 1908
- Dineura fuscipennis Rohwer, 1908
- Dineura parcivalvis (Konow, 1901)
- Dineura stilata (Klug, 1816)
- Dineura testaceipes (Klug, 1816)
- Dineura virididorsata (Retzius, 1783)
