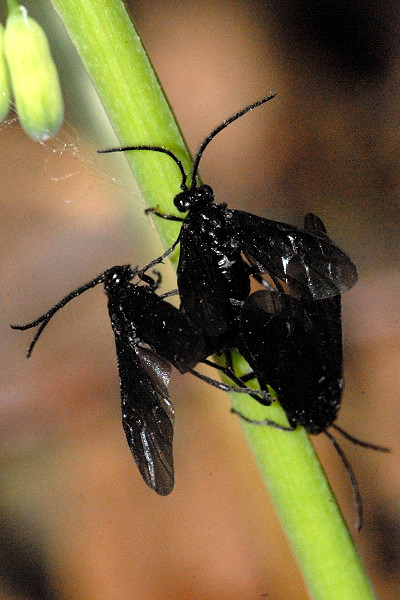
- Phymatocera aterrima

Scientific classification
- Kingdom: Animalia
- Phylum: Arthropoda
- Class: Insecta
- Order: Hymenoptera
- Suborder: Symphyta
- Family: Tenthredinidae
- Genus: Phymatocera; Dahlbom, 1835

= Phymatocera =

Genus of sawflies

Phymatocera is a genus of sawflies belonging to the family Tenthredinidae.

Species:

- Phymatocera aterrima
