= Platycampus =

Scientific classification
- Kingdom: Animalia
- Phylum: Arthropoda
- Class: Insecta
- Order: Hymenoptera
- Suborder: Symphyta
- Family: Tenthredinidae
- Genus: Platycampus; Schiødte, 1839

Genus of sawflies

Platycampus is a genus of sawflies belonging to the family Tenthredinidae.

The species of this genus are found in Europe, Easternmost Asia and Northern America.

Species:

- Platycampus amurensis
- Platycampus itascus Rohwer & Middleton
