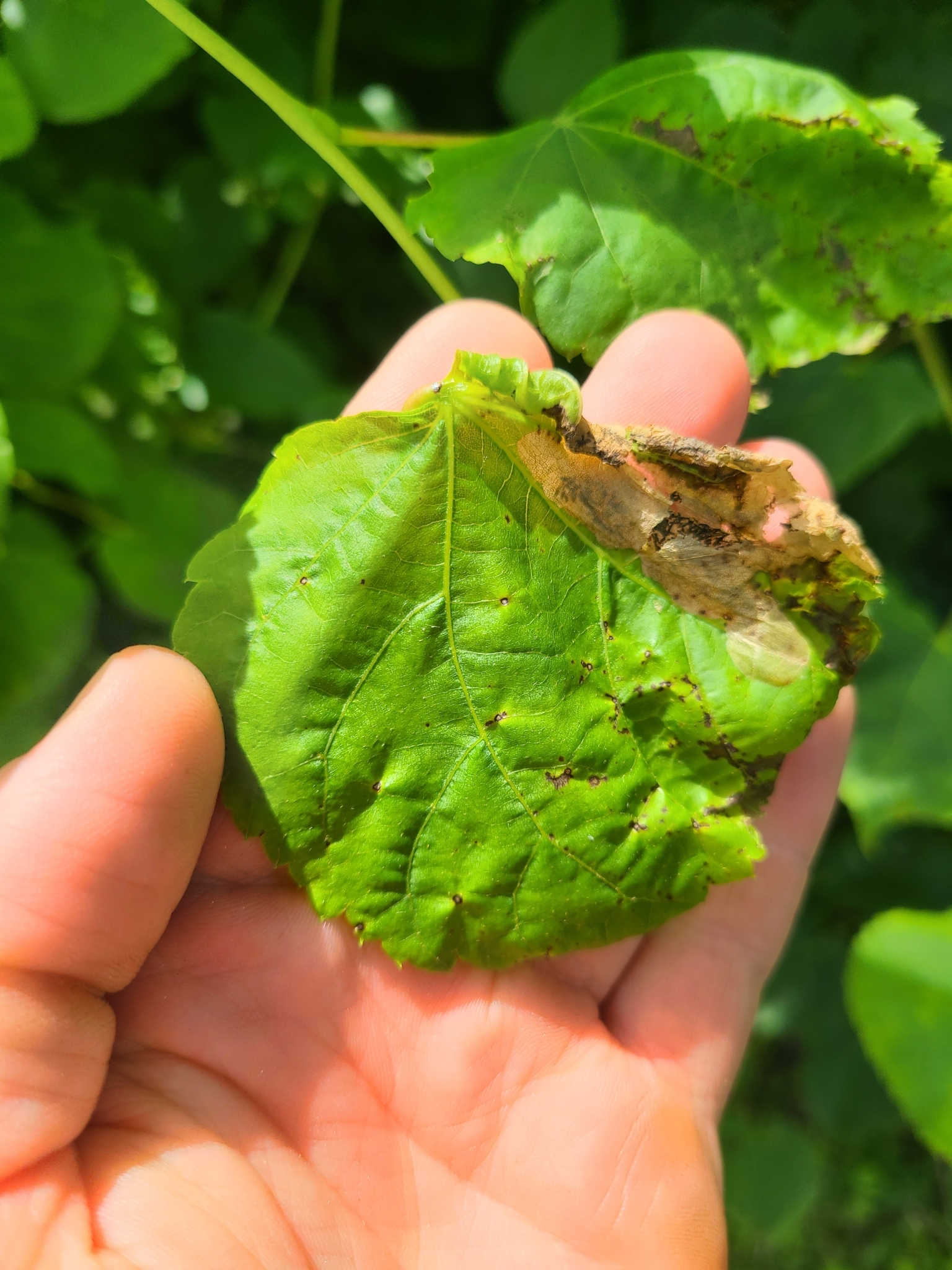
- Parna tenella on Tilia cordata, Austria

Scientific classification
- Domain: Eukaryota
- Kingdom: Animalia
- Phylum: Arthropoda
- Class: Insecta
- Order: Hymenoptera
- Suborder: Symphyta
- Family: Tenthredinidae
- Genus: Parna; Benson, 1936

= Parna (sawfly) =

Genus of sawflies

Parna is a genus of sawflies in the family Tenthredinidae. There are at least seven described species in Parna, found in Europe and Asia.

== Species ==
These seven species belong to the genus Parna:

- Parna apicalis (Brischke, 1888) (Europe)
- Parna babai Togashi, 1990 (Japan, Russia)
- Parna distincta Wei, 1997 (China)
- Parna kamijoi Togashi, 1980 (Japan, Russia)
- Parna parvitatis Lee & Ryu, 1996 (South Korea)
- Parna tenella (Klug, 1816) (Europe, Japan, Russia)
