= Phyllocolpa =

Scientific classification
- Kingdom: Animalia
- Phylum: Arthropoda
- Class: Insecta
- Order: Hymenoptera
- Suborder: Symphyta
- Family: Tenthredinidae
- Genus: Phyllocolpa; Benson, 1960

Genus of insects

Phyllocolpa is a genus of insects belonging to the family Tenthredinidae.

The species of this genus are found in Europe and Northern America.

Species:

- Phyllocolpa acutiserra (Lindqvist, 1949)
- Phyllocolpa alienata (Foerster, 1854)
