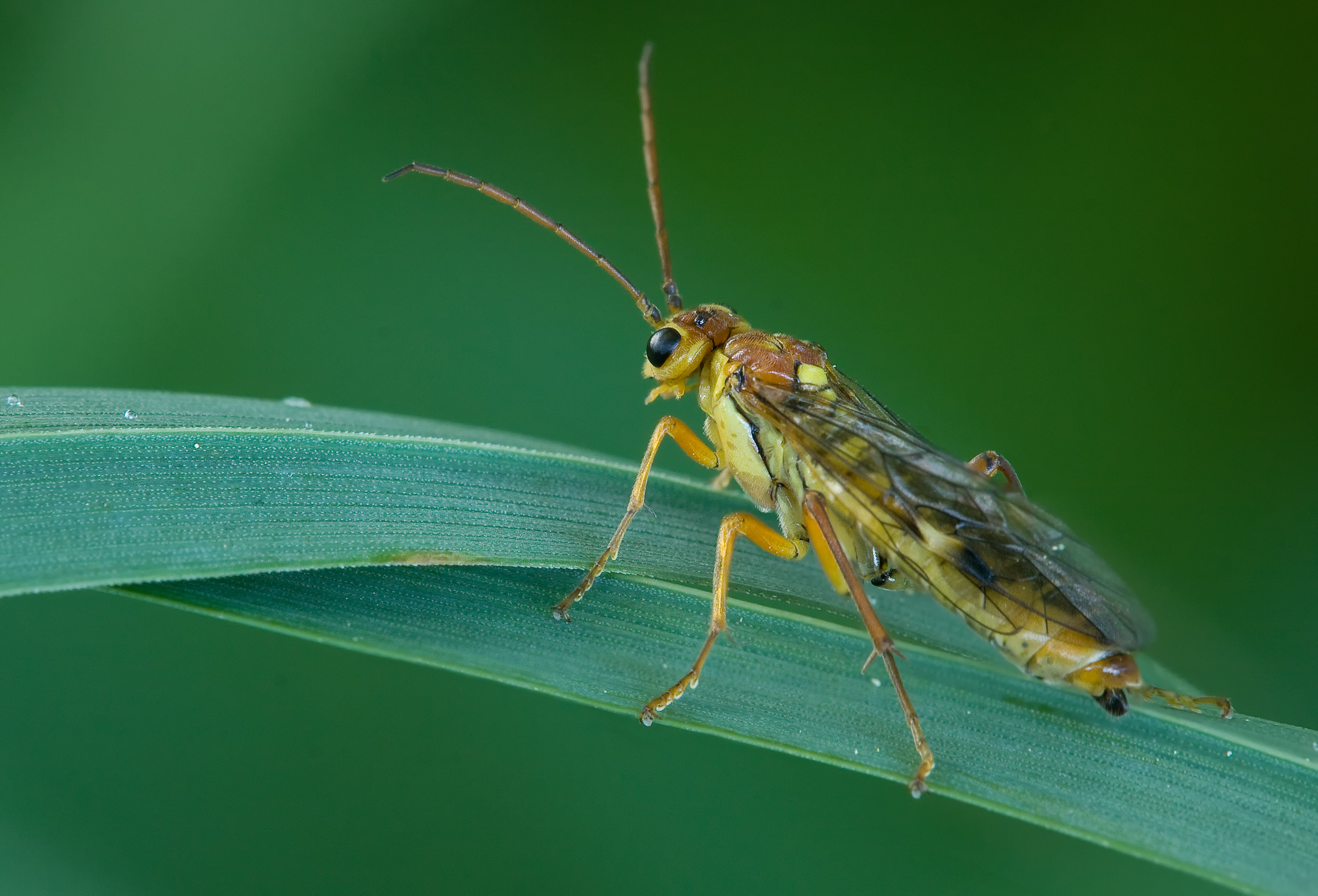
- Female Tenthredopsis sordida

Scientific classification
- Kingdom: Animalia
- Phylum: Arthropoda
- Clade: Pancrustacea
- Class: Insecta
- Order: Hymenoptera
- Suborder: Symphyta
- Superfamily: Tenthredinoidea
- Family: Tenthredinidae; Latreille, 1802

Type genus
- Tenthredo Linnaeus, 1758

Subfamilies
- Allantinae; Blennocampinae; Heterarthrinae; Nematinae; Selandriinae - (includes Dolerinae); Susaninae; Tenthredininae

= Tenthredinidae =

Family of sawflies

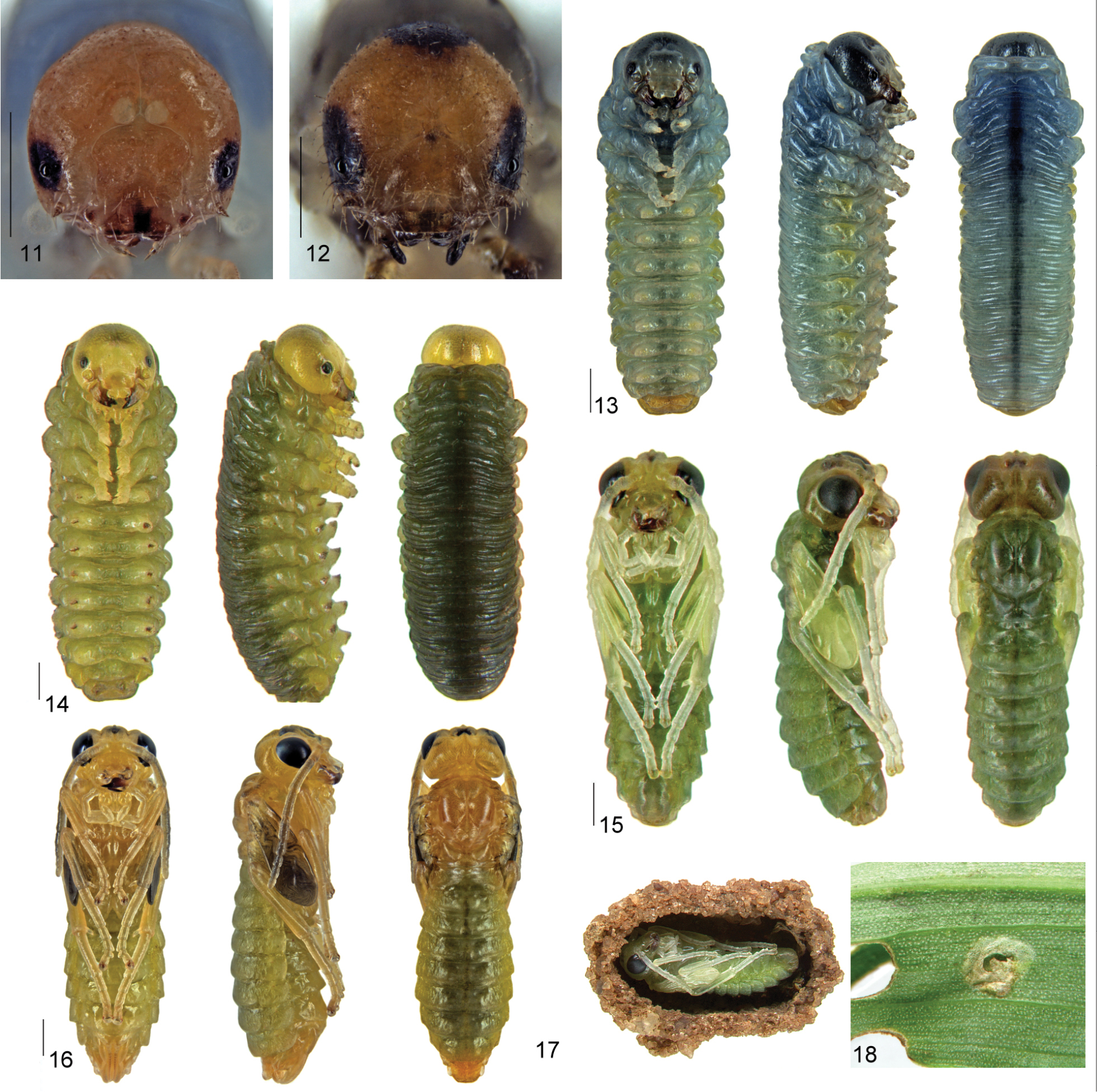
Xenapates larvae and pupae

Tenthredinidae is the largest family of sawflies, with well over 7,500 species worldwide, divided into 430 genera. Larvae are herbivores and typically feed on the foliage of trees and shrubs, with occasional exceptions that are leaf miners, stem borers, or gall makers. The larvae of externally feeding species resemble small caterpillars. As with all hymenopterans, common sawflies undergo complete metamorphosis.

The family has no easily seen diagnostic features, though the combination of five to nine antennal flagellomeres plus a clear separation of the first abdominal tergum from the metapleuron can reliably separate them. These sawflies are often black or brown, and 3 to 20 mm long. Like other sawflies, they lack the slender "wasp-waist", or petiole, between the thorax and abdomen, characteristic of many hymenopterans. The mesosoma and the metasoma are instead broadly joined. The Tenthredinidae are also often somewhat dorsoventrally flattened, which will distinguish them at least from the slender cephids (which, together with the common sawflies, comprise many of the Nearctic species of Symphyta).

Females use their saw-like ovipositors to cut slits through barks of twigs, into which translucent eggs are wedged, which damages the trees. They are common in meadows, and in forest glades near rapid streams. Adults eat little, while larvae feed on foliage of streamside trees and shrubs, especially willow.

A number of species and genera have been described from the fossil record such as Eriocampa tulameenensis and Pseudosiobla campbelli of British Columbia.

== Life cycle of Cladius difformis ==
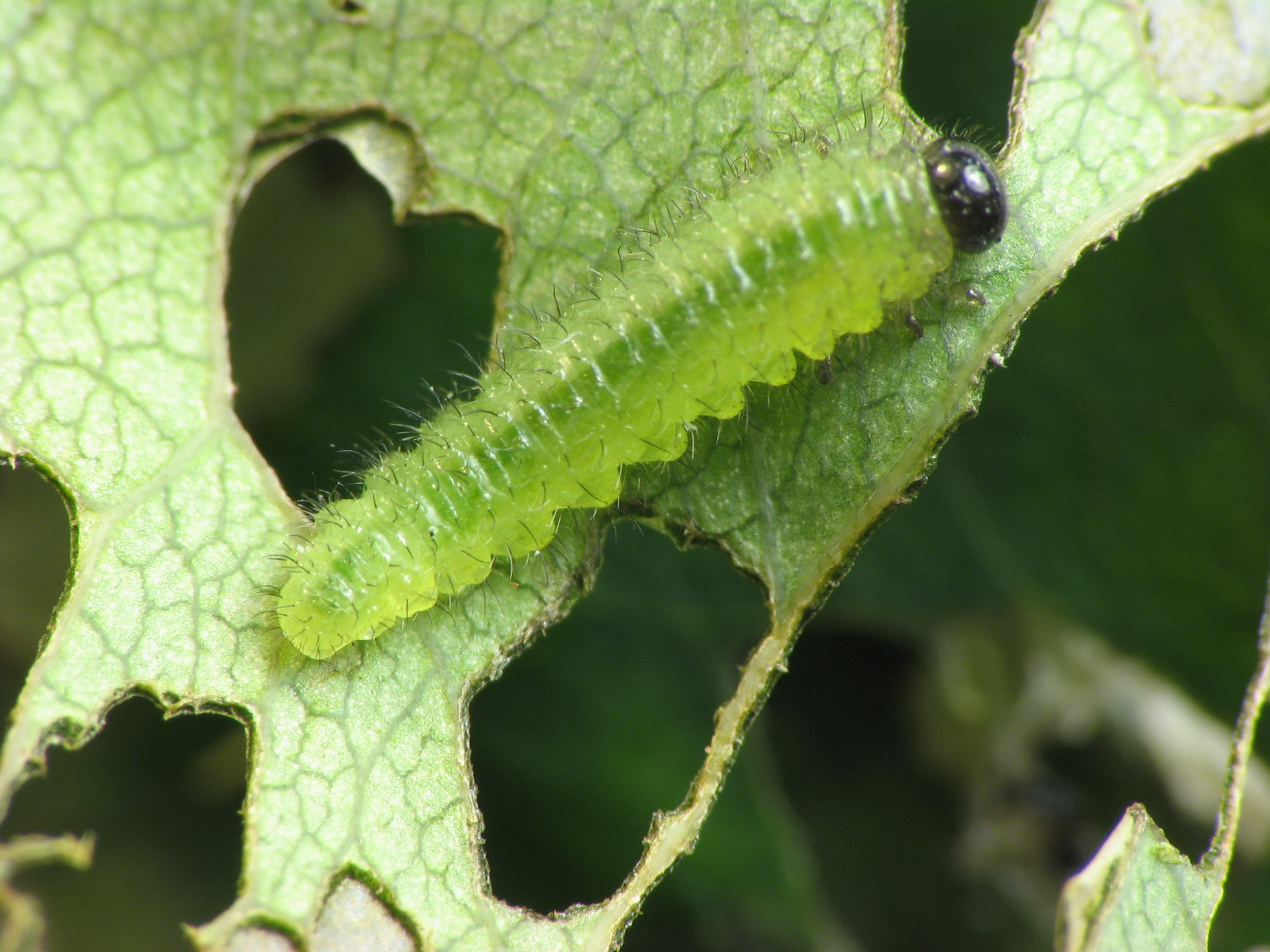
Larva

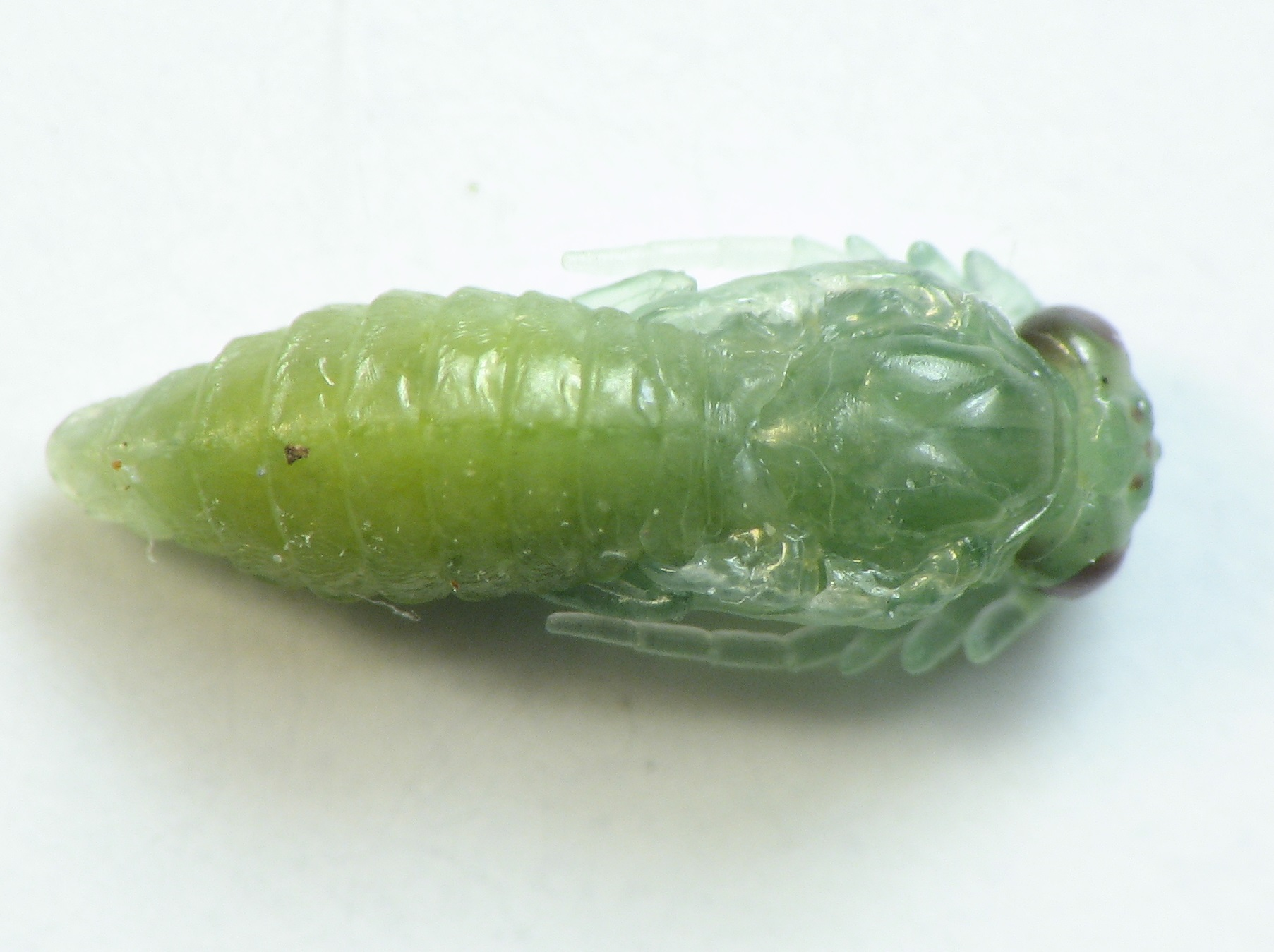
Pupa, dorsal view

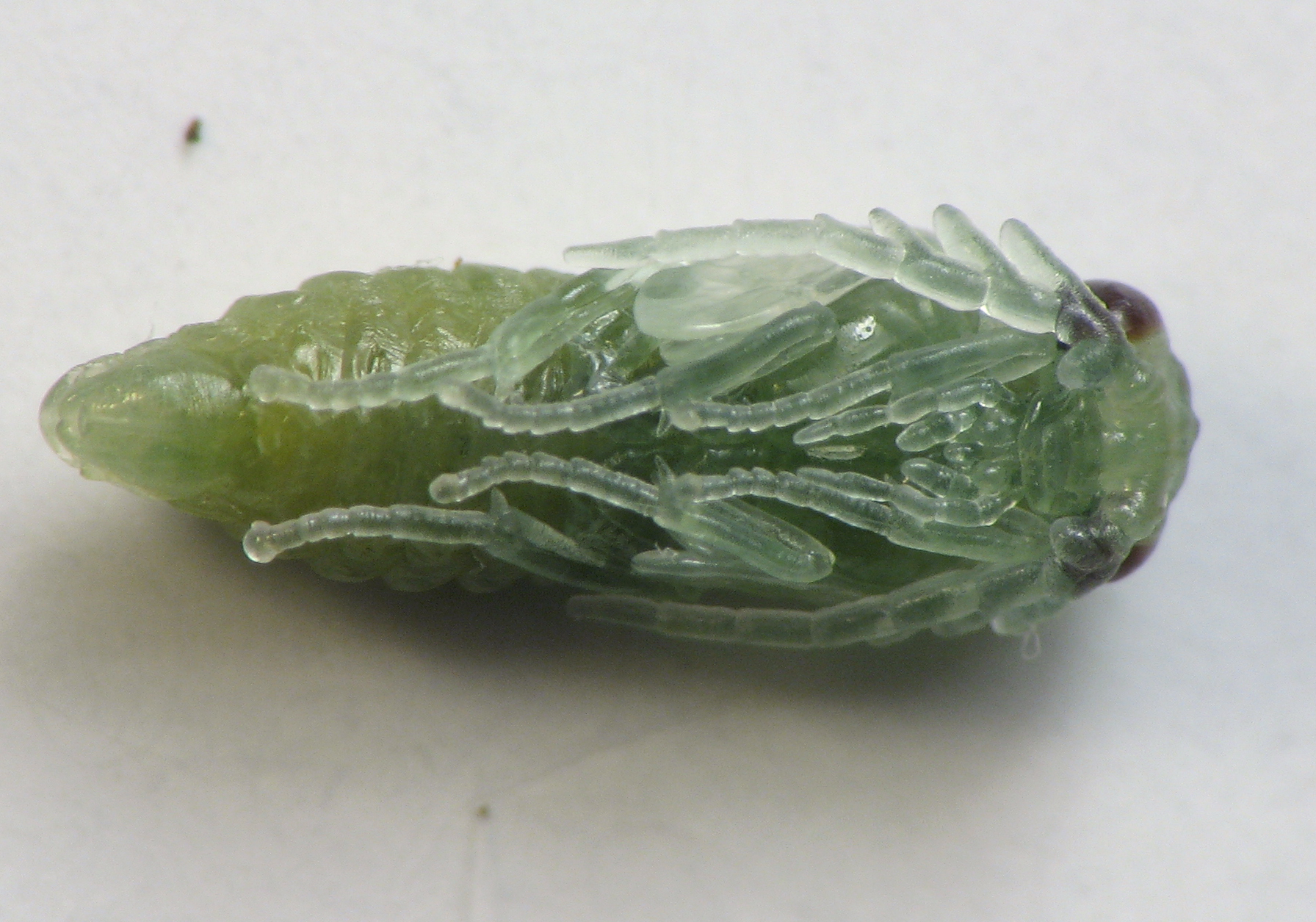
Pupa, ventral view

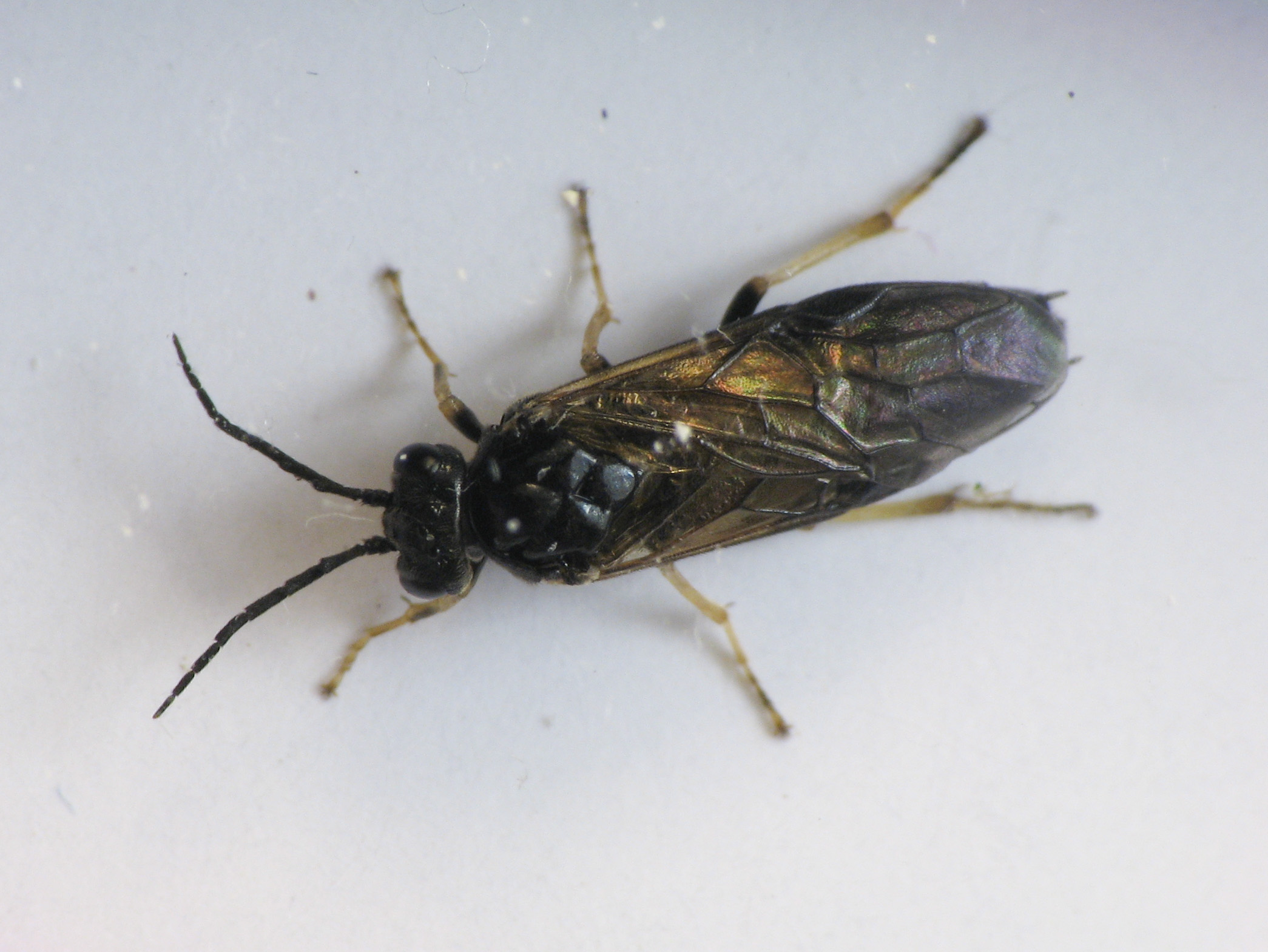
Female

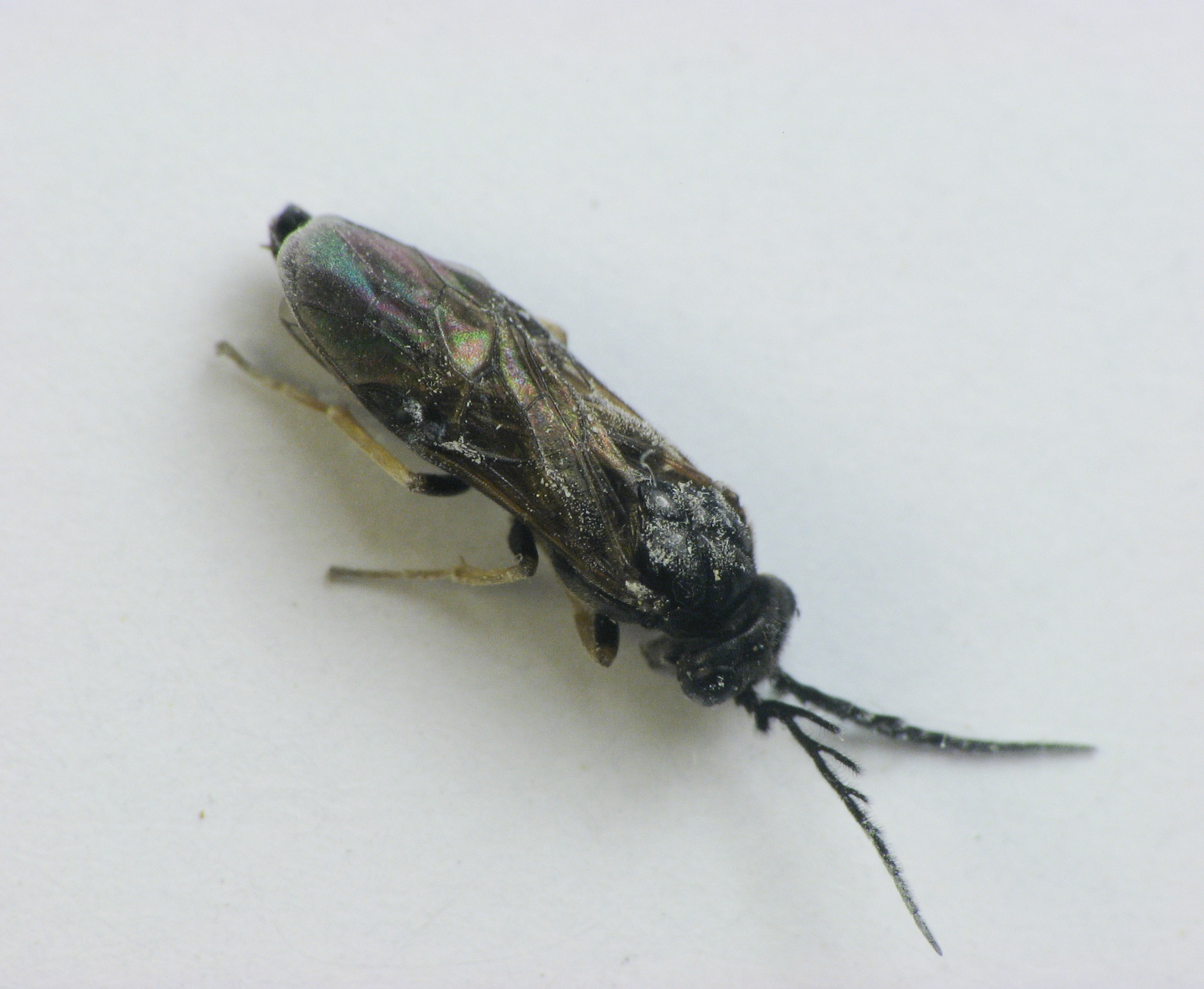
Male

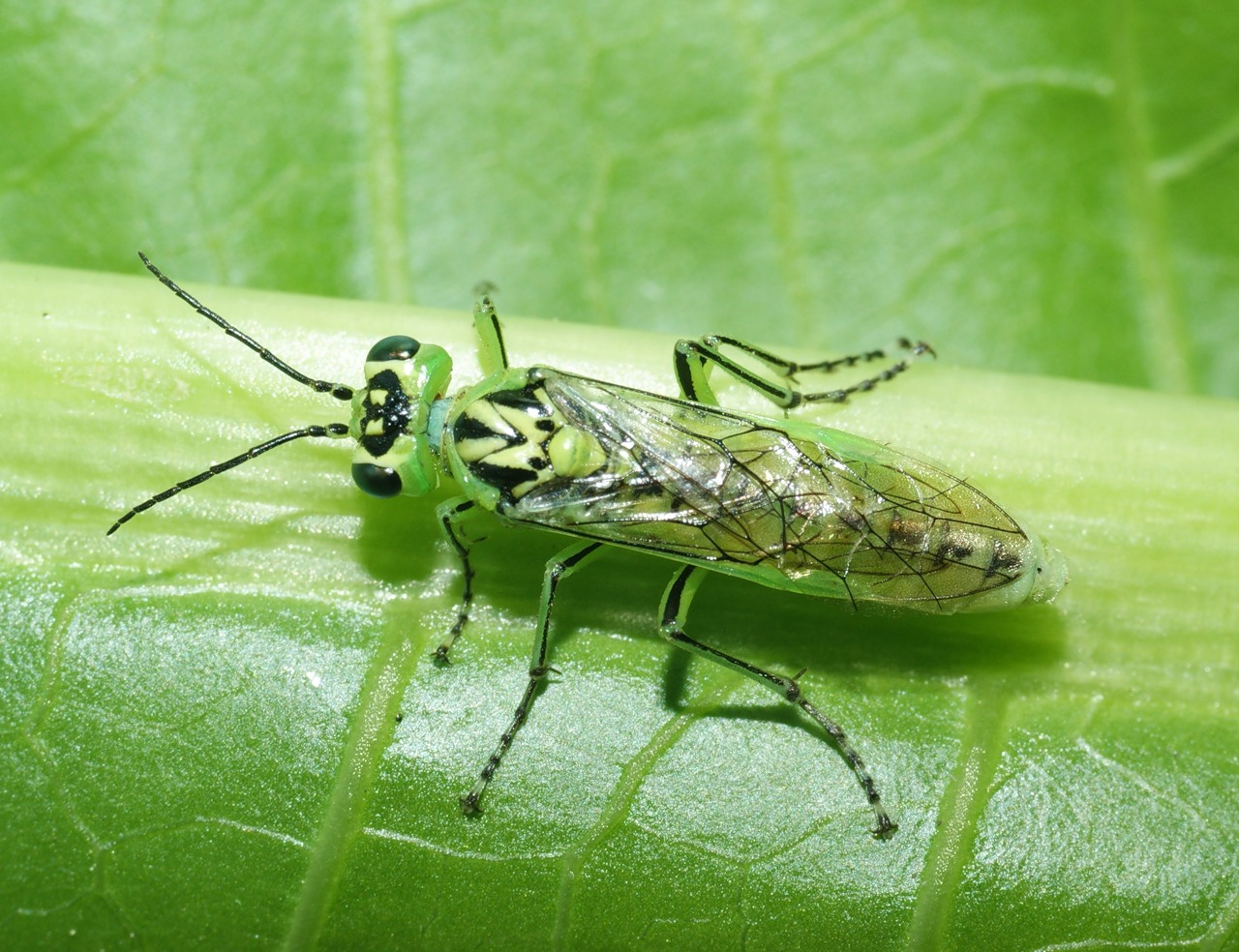
Rhogogaster sp.

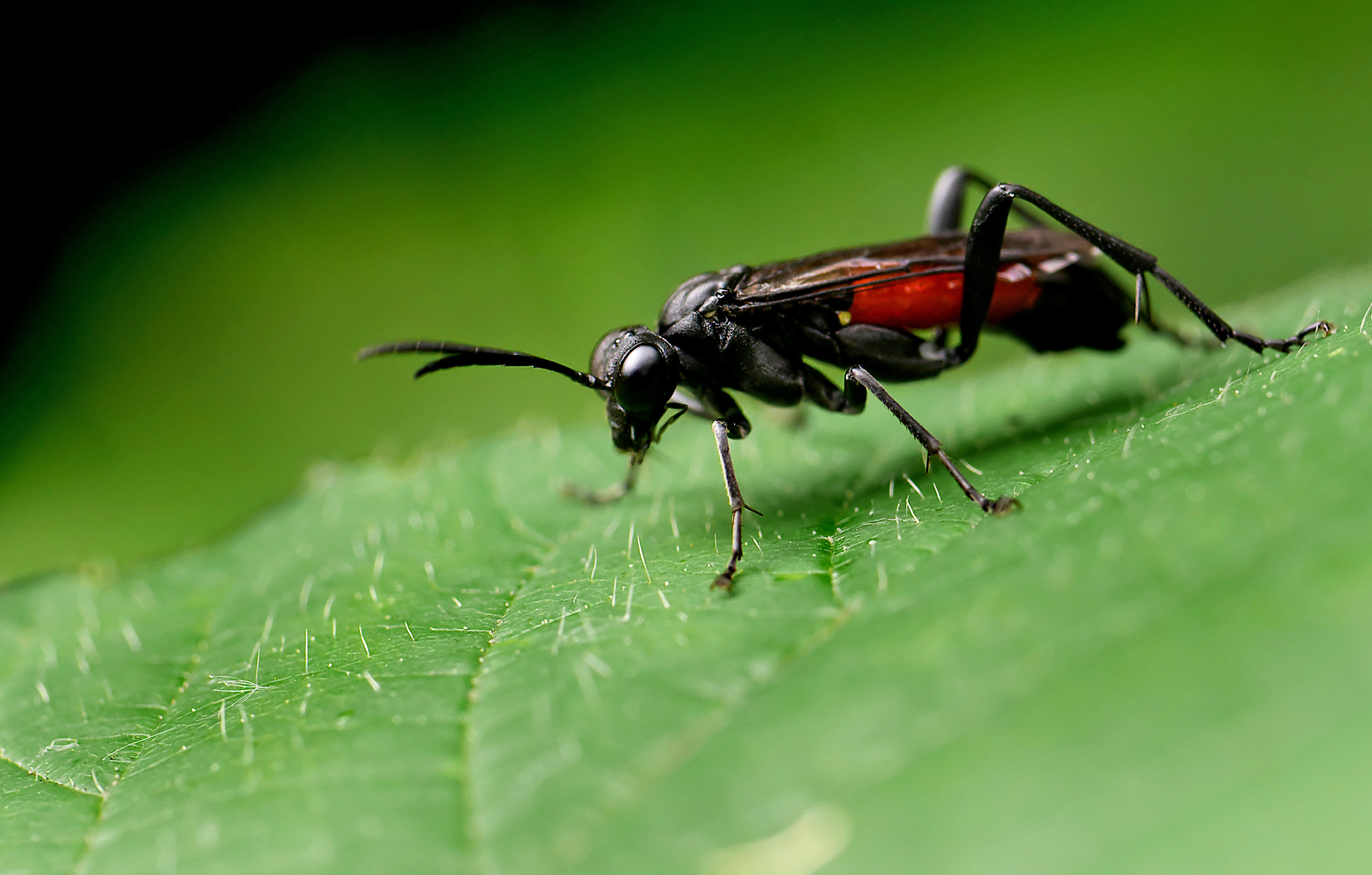
Macrophya annulata, Brussels

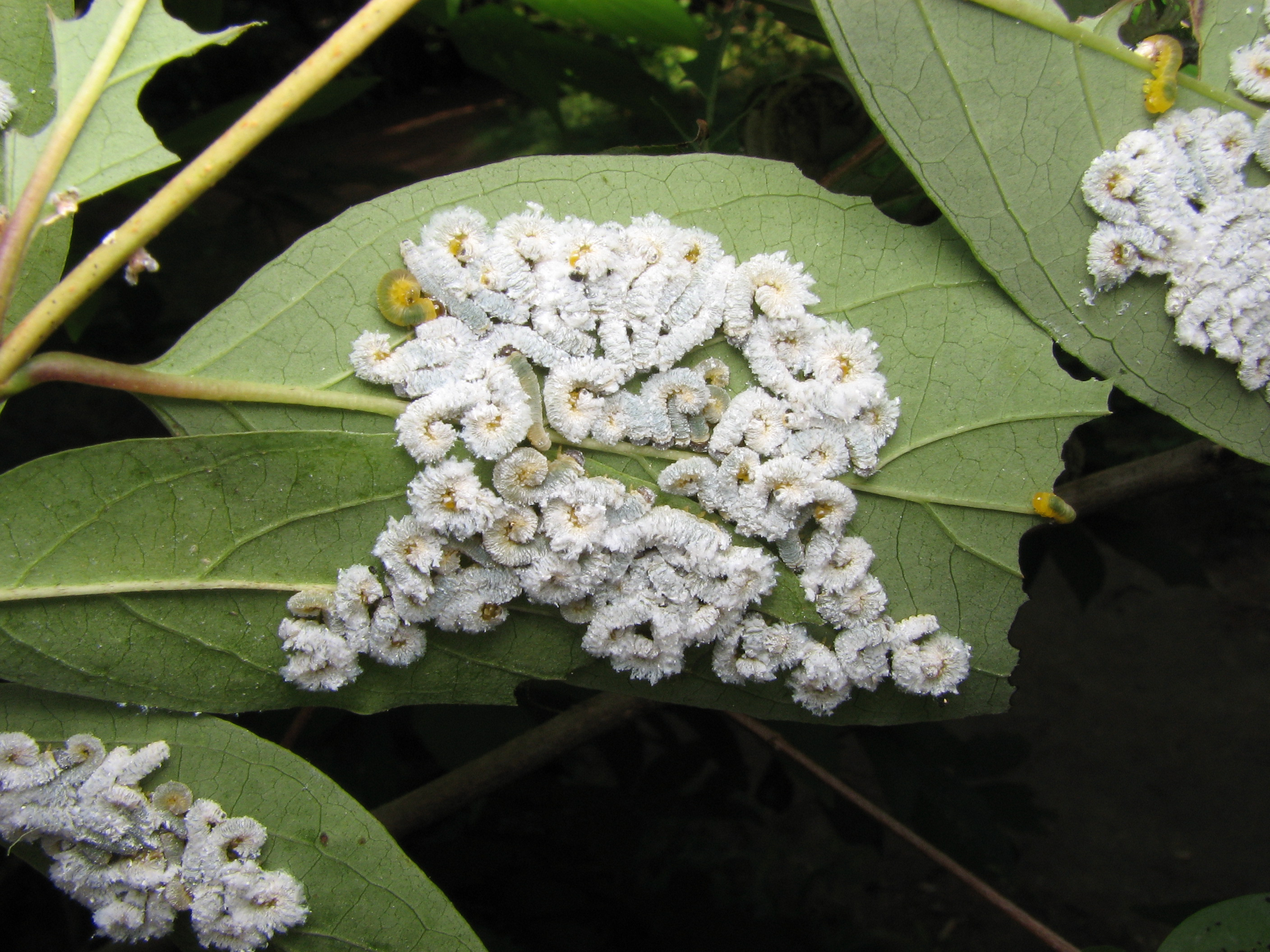
Macremphytus testaceus larvae on dogwood, Cornus sp.

== Taxonomy ==
The Tenthredinidae are divided into seven subfamilies. Of the 430 genera, nine contain more than 50 species.

=== Subfamilies and genera ===
Subfamilies and genera within this family include:

- Subfamily Allantinae
  - Adamas Malaise, 1945
  - Allantus Panzer, 1801
  - Ametastegia A. Costa, 1882
  - Apethymus Benson, 1939
  - Empria Lepeletier, 1828
  - Eriocampa Hartig, 1837
  - Monosoma MacGillivray, 1908
  - Monostegia O. Costa, 1859
  - Taxonus Hartig, 1837
- Subfamily Blennocampinae
  - Ardis Konow, 1886
  - Blennocampa Hartig, 1837
  - Cladardis Benson, 1952
  - Claremontia Rohwer, 1909
  - Eutomostethus Enslin, 1914
  - Halidamia Benson, 1939
  - Hoplocampoides Enslin, 1913
  - Monardis Benson, 1952
  - Monophadnoides Ashmead, 1898
  - Monophadnus Hartig, 1837
  - Paracharactus MacGillivray, 1908
  - Periclista Konow, 1886
  - Phymatocera Dahlbom, 1835
  - Rhadinoceraea Konow, 1886
  - Stethomostus Benson, 1939
  - Tomostethus Konow, 1886
- Subfamily Heterarthrinae
  - Caliroa O. Costa, 1859
  - Endelomyia Ashmead, 1898
  - Fenella Westwood, 1840
  - Fenusa Leach, 11817
  - Heterarthrus Stephens, 1835
  - Messa Leach, 1817
  - Metallus Forbes, 1885
  - Parna Benson, 1936
  - Profenusa MacGillivray, 1914
  - Rocalia Takeuchi, 1952
  - Scolioneura Konow, 1890
- Subfamily Nematinae
  - Amauronematus Konow, 1890
  - Anoplonyx Marlatt, 1896
  - Cladius Illiger, 1807
  - Croesus Leach, 1817
  - Decanematus Malaise, 1931
  - Dineura Dahlbom, 1835
  - Eitelius Kontuniemi, 1966
  - Endophytus Hering, 1934
  - Eupontania Zinovjev, 1985
  - Euura Newman, 1837
  - Hemichroa Stephens, 1835
  - Hoplocampa Hartig, 1837
  - Mesoneura Hartig, 1837
  - Micronematus Konow, 1890
  - Nematinus Rohwer, 1911
  - Nematus Panzer, 1801
  - Pachynematus Konow, 1890
  - Pikonema Ross, 1937
  - Platycampus Schiødte, 1839
  - Pontania Costa, 1859
  - Pontopristia Malaise, 1921
  - Priophorus Dahlbom, 1835
  - Pristiphora Latreille, 1810
  - Pseudodineura Konow, 1885
  - Sharliphora Wong, 1969
  - Stauronematus Benson, 1953
  - Trichiocampus Hartig, 1837
- Subfamily Selandriinae
  - Aneugmenus Hartig, 1837
  - Birka Malaise, 1944
  - Brachythops Haliday, 1839
  - Dolerus Jurine, 1807
  - Dulophanes Konow, 1907
  - Hemitaxonus Ashmead, 1898
  - Heptamelus Haliday, 1855
  - Loderus Konow, 1890
  - Nesoselandria Rohwer, 1910
  - Pseudoheptamelus Conde, 1932
  - Selandria Leach, 1817
  - Strombocerina Malaise, 1942
  - Strongylogaster Dahlbom, 1835
- Subfamily Susaninae
  - Susana Rohwer & Middleton, 1932
- Subfamily Tenthredininae
  - Aglaostigma Kirby, 1882
  - Eurogaster Zirngiebl, 1953
  - Ischyroceraea Kiaer, 1898
  - Macrophya Dahlbom, 1835
  - Pachyprotasis Hartig, 1837
  - Perineura Hartig, 1837
  - Rhogogaster Konow, 1884
  - Siobla Cameron, 1877
  - Tenthredo Linnaeus, 1758
  - Tenthredopsis A. Costa, 1859
  - Tyloceridius Malaise, 1945
  - Ussurinus Malaise, 1931

=== Phylogeny ===
Of these subfamilies, Tenthredininae and Allantinae are sister groups, and together form a sister group to the Nematinae.

== Bibliography ==
- Asaro, Christopher (2008-08-11). Sawflies (Hymenoptera: Symphyta). Springer. pp. 3250–3252. ISBN 978-1-4020-6242-1., in Capinera (2008)
- Boevé, Jean-Luc (2008-08-11). Sawflies (Hymenoptera: Tenthredinidae). Springer. pp. 3252–3257. ISBN 978-1-4020-6242-1., in Capinera (2008)
- Capinera, John L., ed. (2008). Encyclopedia of Entomology (2nd ed.). Dordrecht: Springer. ISBN 978-1-4020-6242-1.
- Blank, S.M.; Groll, E.K.; Liston, A.D.; Prous, M.; Taeger, A. (2012). "ECatSym - Electronic World Catalog of Symphyta (Insecta, Hymenoptera). Program version 4.0 beta, data version 39". Müncheberg: Digital Entomological Information.
- Blank, S.M.; Taeger, A. (1998). Comments on the taxonomy of Symphyta (Hymenoptera). pp. 141–174., in Taeger, A. & Blank, S. M. (eds.), Pflanzenwespen Deutschlands (Hymenoptera, Symphyta) Kommentierte Bestandsaufname. Deutsches Entomologisches Institut, Goecke& Evers, Keltern.
- Goulet, Henri; Huber, John T., eds. (1993). Hymenoptera of the world: An identification guide to families (PDF). Ottawa: Agriculture Canada. ISBN 978-0-660-14933-2. Archived from the original (PDF) on 2016-03-05.
- Liston, Andrew; Knight, Guy; Sheppard, David; Broad, Gavin; Livermore, Laurence (29 August 2014). "Checklist of British and Irish Hymenoptera - Sawflies, 'Symphyta'". Biodiversity Data Journal. 2 (2) e1168. doi:10.3897/BDJ.2.e1168. PMC 4152835. PMID 25197241.
- Smith, David R (September 1969). Nearctic sawflies I. Blennocampinae: Adults and larvae (Hymenoptera: Tenthredinidae) (Technical Bulletin 1397). Washington: US Department of Agriculture.
- Smith, David R (September 1969). Nearctic sawflies II.Selandriinae: Adults and larvae (Hymenoptera: Tenthredinidae) (Technical Bulletin 1398). Washington: US Department of Agriculture.
- Smith, David R (January 1971). Nearctic sawflies III. Heterarthrinae: Adults and larvae (Hymenoptera: Tenthredinidae) (Technical Bulletin 1420). Washington: US Department of Agriculture.
- Smith, David R (June 1979). Nearctic sawflies IV. Allantinae: Adults and larvae (Hymenoptera: Tenthredinidae) (Technical Bulletin 1595). Washington: US Department of Agriculture.
- Smith, David R (March 2003). "A Synopsis of the Sawflies (Hymenoptera: Symphyta) of America South of the United States: Tenthredinidae (Nematinae, Heterarthrinae, Tenthredininae)". Transactions of the American Entomological Society. 129 (1): 1–45. JSTOR 25078795.
- Song, Sheng-Nan; Tang, Pu; Wei, Shu-Jun; Chen, Xue-Xin (16 February 2016). "Comparative and phylogenetic analysis of the mitochondrial genomes in basal hymenopterans". Scientific Reports. 6 20972. Bibcode:2016NatSR...620972S. doi:10.1038/srep20972. PMC 4754708. PMID 26879745.
- Skvarla, Michael; Smith, David; Fisher, Danielle; Dowling, Ashley (9 May 2016). "Terrestrial arthropods of Steel Creek, Buffalo National River, Arkansas. II. Sawflies (Insecta: Hymenoptera: " Symphyta ")". Biodiversity Data Journal. 4 (4) e8830. doi:10.3897/BDJ.4.e8830. PMC 4867044. PMID 27222635.
