= List of Hymenoptera of Ireland =

At least 3,042 species of Hymenoptera are known to occur in Ireland. The true number of species occurring in Ireland is thought to be significantly greater than this figure.

== Suborder Symphyta (sawflies) ==
=== Superfamily Xyeloidea ===
- Xyelidae 1 species
- Xyela julii

=== Superfamily Pamphilioidea ===
- Pamphilidae (leaf-rolling / web-spinning sawflies) 8 species

including

- Pamphilius hortorum
- Pamphilius betulae
- Pamphilius sylvaticus

=== Superfamily Siricoidea ===
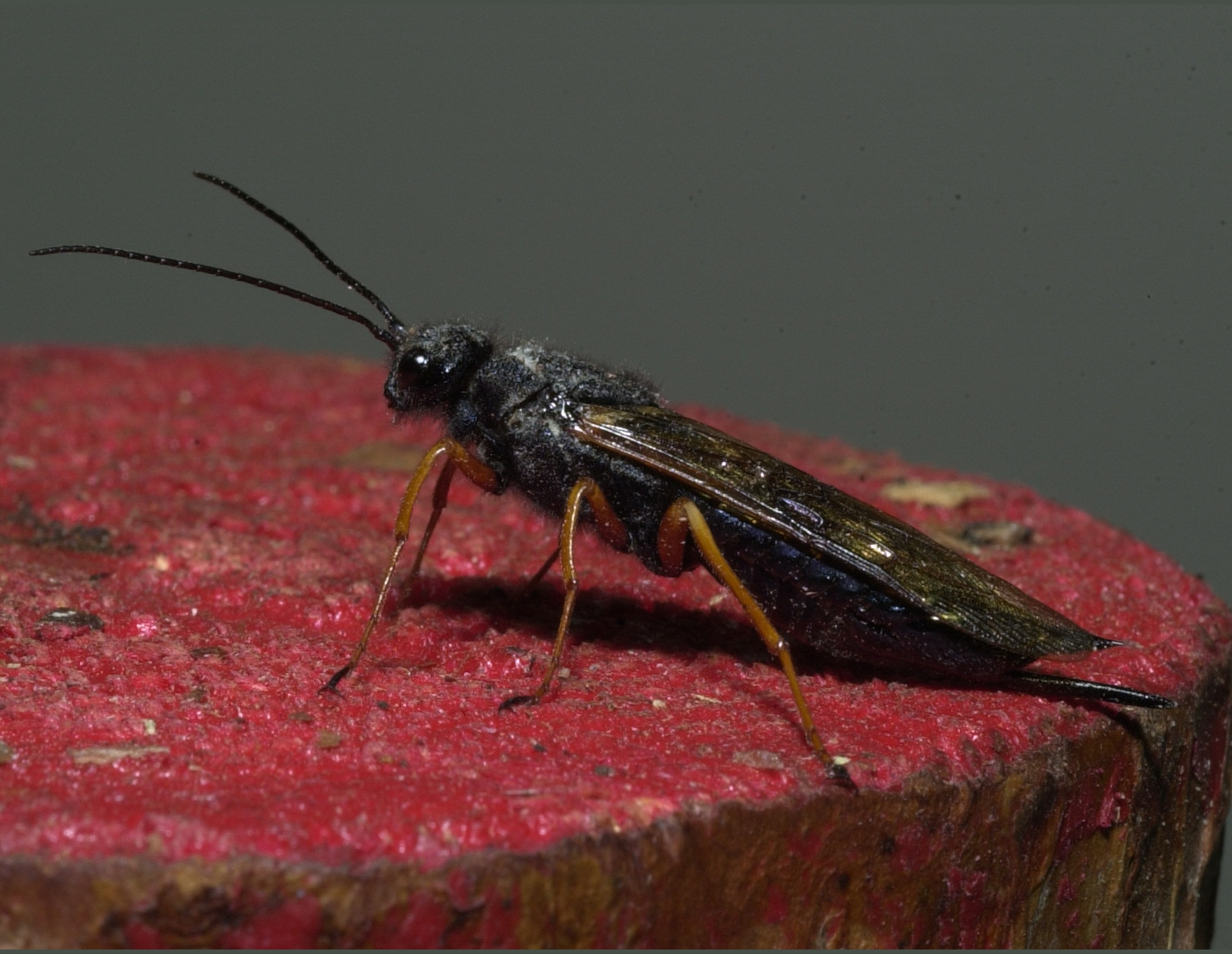
Sirex woodwasp (Sirex noctilio), a species of horntail.

- Siricidae (horntail, wood wasp) 5 species including
- Urocerus gigas
- Sirex cyaneus
- Sirex juvencus
- Sirex noctilio
- Xeris spectrum

=== Superfamily Cephoidea (stem sawflies) ===
- Cephidae 1 species
- Calameuta pallipes

=== Superfamily Tenthredinoidea ===
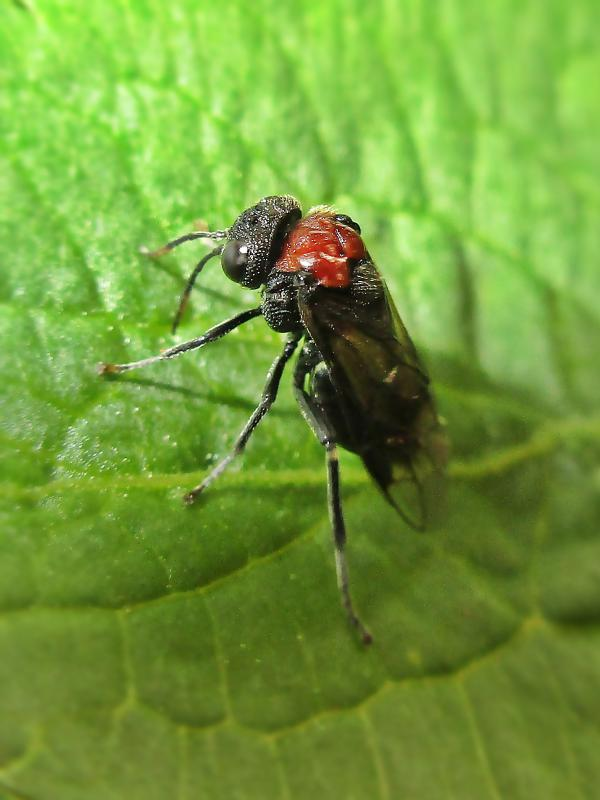
Alder sawfly (Eriocampa ovata), found in the south of Ireland.

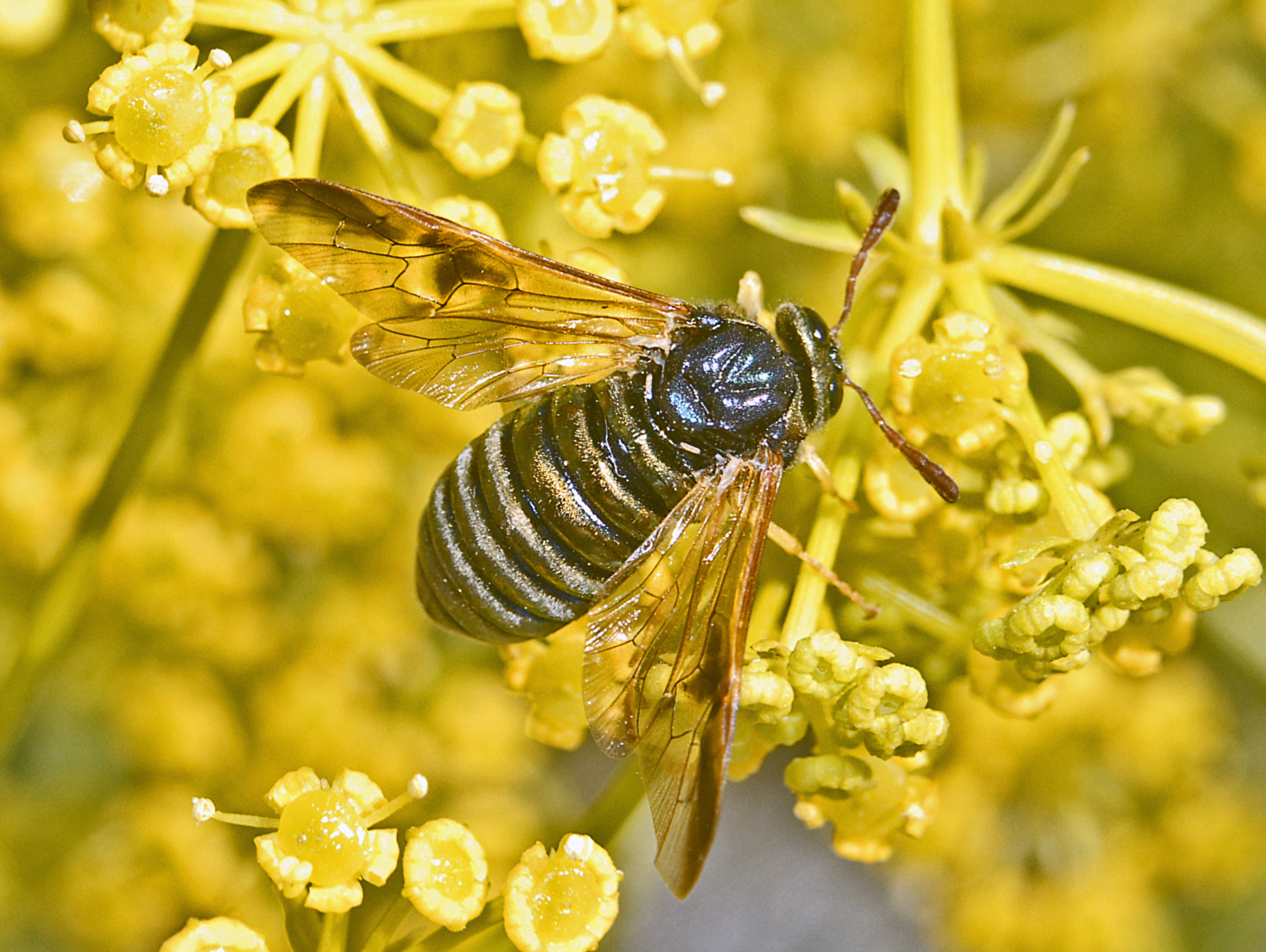
Club-horned sawfly (Abia sericea), recorded in Counties Sligo and Donegal.

- Argidae (some sawflies) 7 species including
- Arge cyanocrocea
- Arge ustulata
- Sterictiphora geminata
- Cimbicidae (large-bodied, often hairy sawflies) 10 species including
- Abia sericea
- Cimbex femoratus
- Trichiosoma lucorum
- Trichiosoma vitellina
- Diprionidae (conifer sawflies) 3 species including
- Neodiprion sertifer
- Diprion pini
- Tenthredinidae (many sawflies) 239 species including
- Aglaostigma aucupariae
- Aglaostigma fulvipes
- Allantus cinctus
- Amauronematus lateralis
- Aneugmenus padi
- Apethymus serotinus
- Athalia circularis
- Athalia cordata
- Athalia lugens
- Athalia rosae
- Athalia scutellariae
- Calameuta pallipes
- Caliroa cerasi
- Cladius pectinicornis
- Dolerus aeneus
- Dolerus aericeps
- Dolerus bajulus
- Dolerus germanicus
- Dolerus madidus
- Dolerus nitens
- Dolerus picipes
- Dolerus varispinus
- Dolerus vestigialis
- Empria liturata
- Endelomyia aethiops
- Euura pavida
- Eutomostethus ephippium
- Eriocampa ovata
- Fenella nigrita
- Fenusa dohrnii
- Fenusa pumila
- Fenusella hortulana
- Fenusella nana
- Halidamia affinis
- Hemichroa australis
- Hemichroa crocea
- Heterarthrus microcephalus
- Heterarthrus nemoratus
- Heterarthrus vagans
- Hoplocampa pectoralis
- Macrophya duodecimpunctata
- Macrophya punctumalbum
- Mesoneura opaca
- Metallus pumilus
- Monophadnoides rubi
- Monostegia abdominalis
- Monsoma pulveratum
- Nematus lucidus
- Nematus myosotidis
- Nematus ribesii
- Nematus spiraeae
- Nematinus acuminatus
- Nesoselandria morio
- Pachynematus clitellatus
- Pachyprotasis antennata
- Pachyprotasis rapae
- Periclista albida
- Perineura rubi
- Pristiphora geniculata
- Pristiphora cincta
- Pristiphora laricis
- Pristiphora mollis
- Pristiphora staudingeri
- Profenusa pygmaea
- Pseudodineura fuscula
- Rhogogaster viridis
- Selandria serva
- Strombocerus delicatulus
- Strongylogaster multifasciata
- Tenthredo arcuata
- Tenthredo atra
- Tenthredo balteata
- Tenthredo brevicornis
- Tenthredo ferruginea
- Tenthredo livida
- Tenthredo colon
- Tenthredo mesomela
- Tenthredo mioceras
- Tenthredo moniliata
- Tenthredo notha
- Tenthredo obsoleta
- Tenthredo temula
- Tenthredopsis nassata
- Tenthredopsis scutellaris

== Suborder Apocrita (wasps, bees, ants) ==
See List of Hymenoptera (Apocrita) of Ireland

=== Superfamily Chrysidoidea (parasitoid and cleptoparasitic wasps) ===
- Dryinidae 18 species
- Bethylidae (aculeate wasps) 3 species
- Chrysididae (cuckoo/emerald wasp) 6 species

=== Superfamily Vespoidea ===
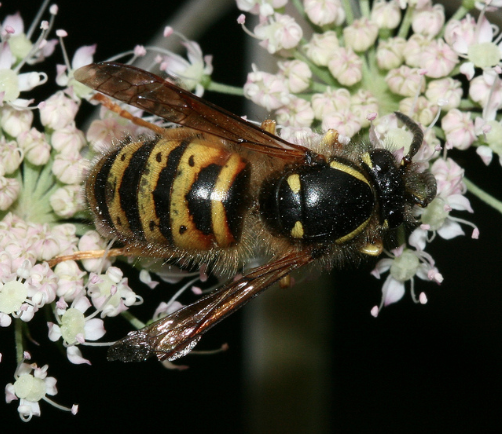
Norwegian wasp (Dolichovespula norwegica)

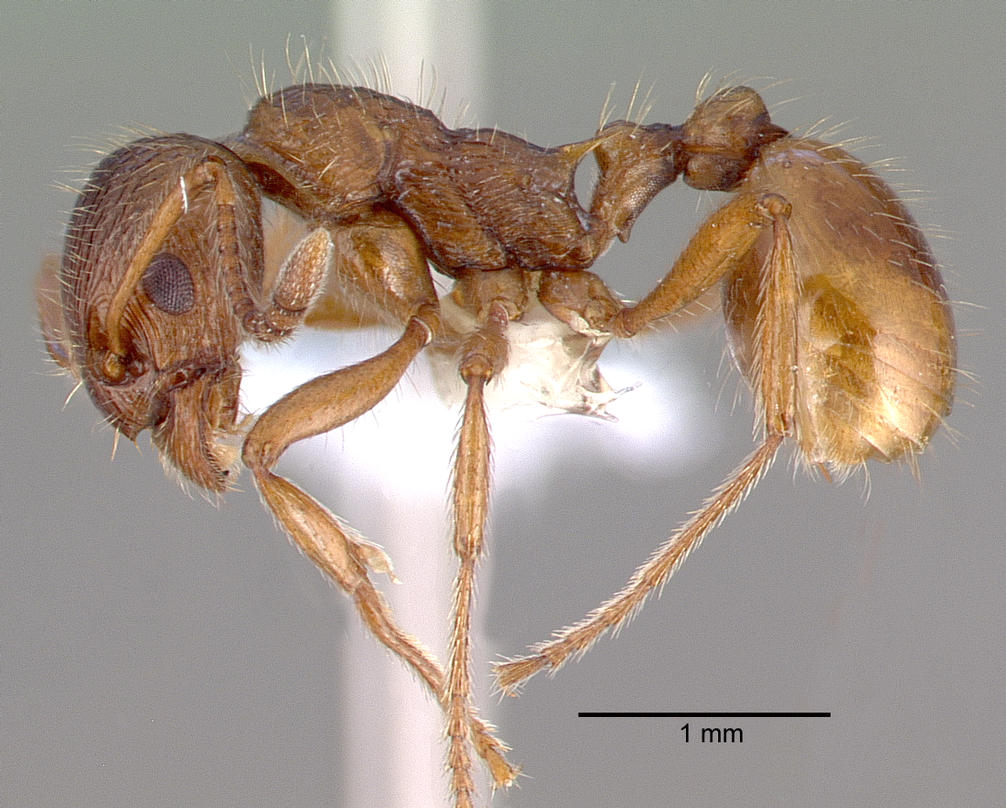
European fire ant (Myrmica rubra)

- Tiphiidae (flower wasps) 1 species
- Mutillidae (velvet ants) 1 species
- Formicidae (ants) 20 + species
- Pompilidae (spider wasps) 13 species
- Vespidae (many eusocial and solitary wasps) 14 species

=== Superfamily Apoidea (sphecoid wasps and bees) ===
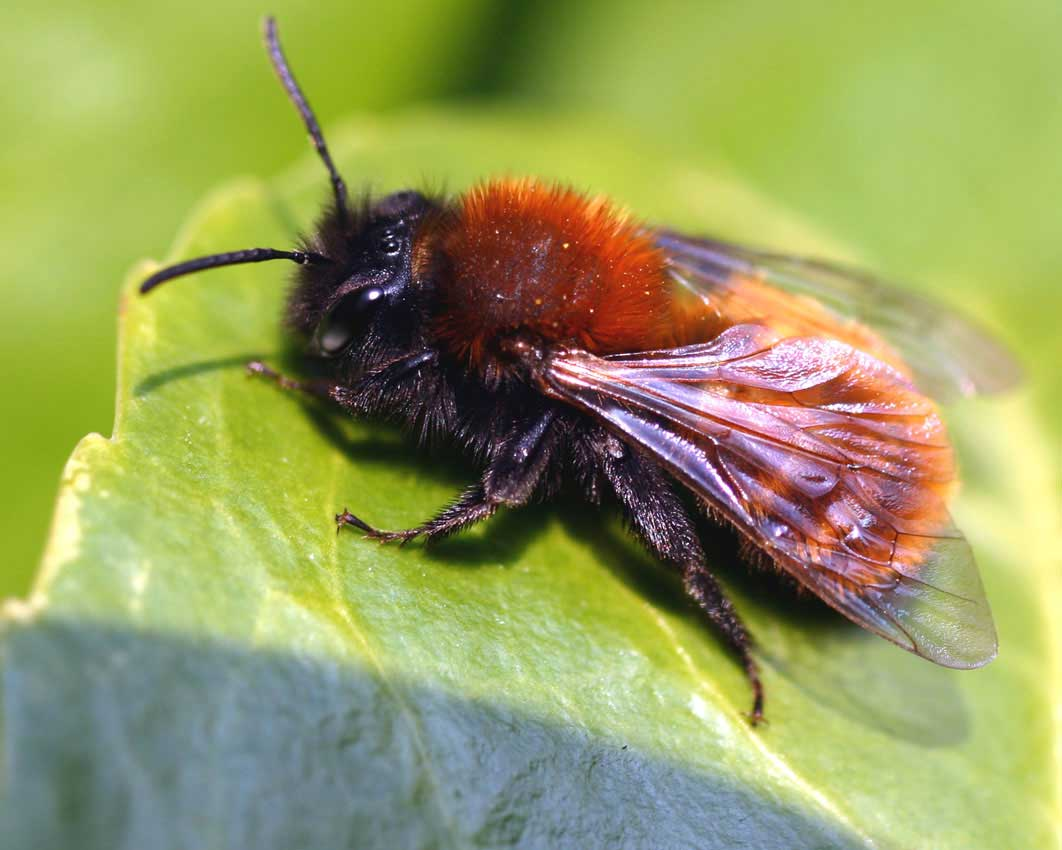
Tawny mining bee (Andrena fulva), found in Leinster.

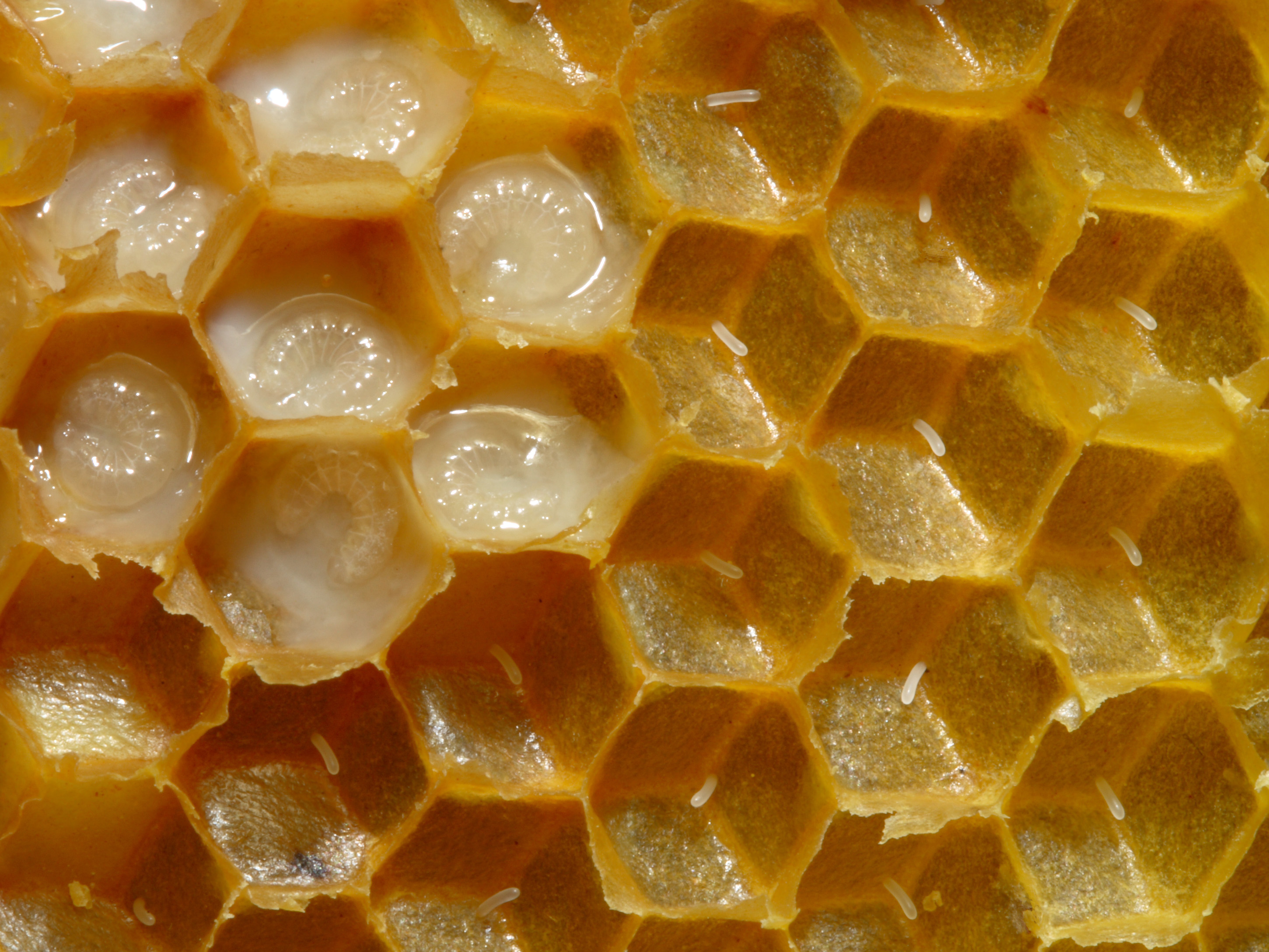
Larvae and eggs of western honey bee (Apis mellifera).

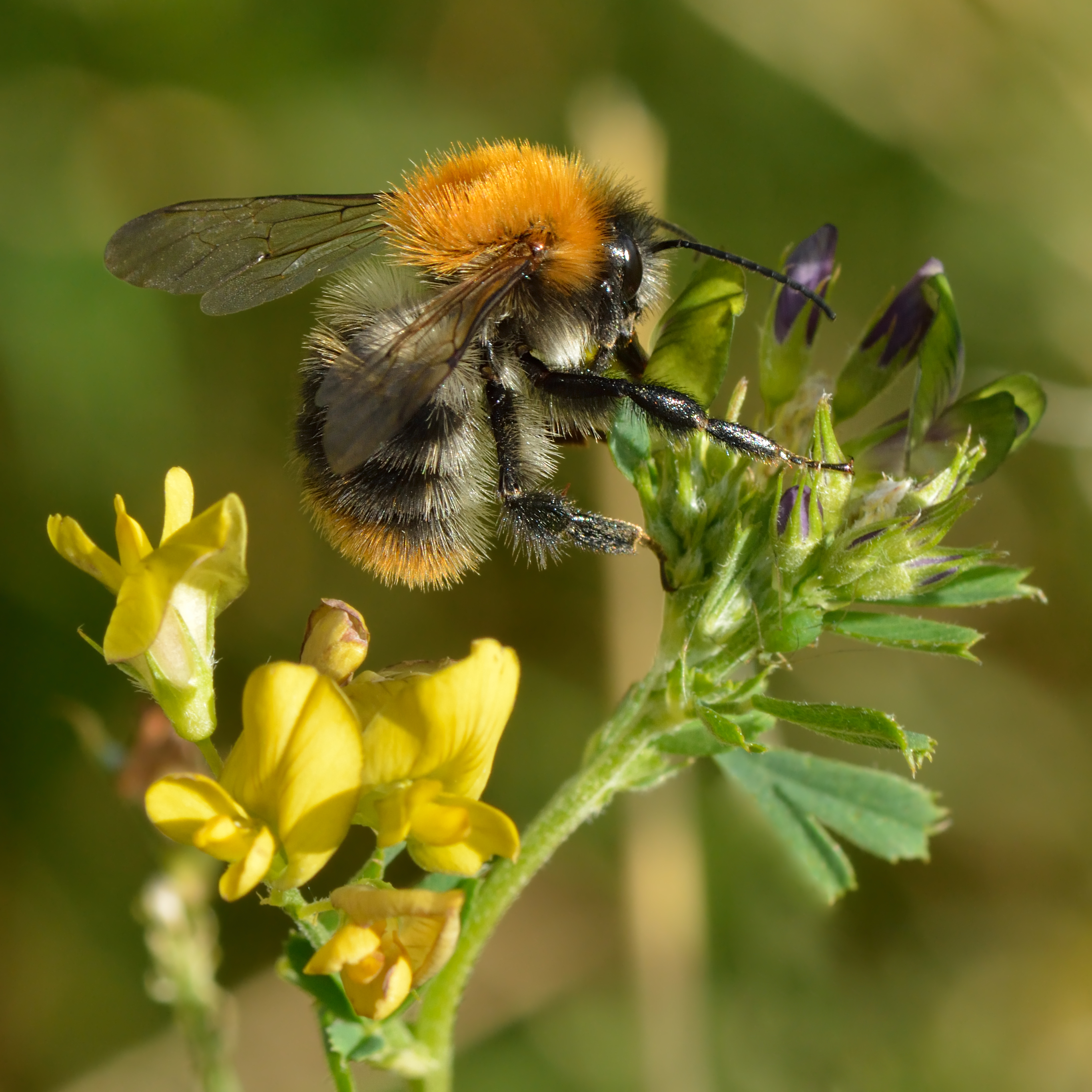
Common carder bee (Bombus pascuorum), Ireland's most common hymenopteran.

- Sphecidae (many parasitoidal wasps) 2 species
- Crabronidae 39 species
- Apidae (bees) 100 species
- Andrenidae (mining bees)

== Suborder Parasitica (parasitoid wasp) ==
=== Superfamily Chalcidoidea (chalcid wasps) ===
- Aphelinidae (tiny parasitic wasps) 11 species
- Chalcididae (parasitoid and hyperparasitoid wasps) 1 species
- Encyrtidae (parasitic wasps) 59 species
- Eulophidae 140 species
- Eupelmidae (parasitic wasps) 3 species including,
  - Eupelmus vesicularis 1 species
- Eurytomidae 17 species
- Mymaridae (fairyflies / fairy wasps) 21 species
- Ormyridae (parasitic wasps) 1 species
- Pteromalidae (parasitoid wasps) 167 species
- Tetracampidae (parasitic wasps) 2 species
- Torymidae 32 species
- Trichogrammatidae (tiny wasps) 3 species

=== Superfamily Ichneumonoidea ===
- Ichneumonidae (ichneumon wasps) 1,135 species including
- Ichneumon sarcitorius
- Ichneumon insidiosus
- Ichneumon extensorius
- Rhyssa persuasoria
- Anomalon cruentatum
- Alomya debellator
- Pimpla rufipes
- Pimpla turionellae
- Pimpla ovivora
- Agrothereutes abbreviatus
- Cratichneumon coruscator
- Amblyjoppa fuscipennis
- Vulgichneumon saturatorius
- Diplazon laetatorius
- Euceros albitarsus
- Astiphromma sericans
- Ophion luteus
- Xorides fuligator
- Braconidae (parasitoid wasps) 529 species including
- Chorebus lateralis
- Cotesia glomerata
- Allurus lituratus
- Agathis breviseta
- Atormus victus
- Blacus humilis
- Centistes ater
- Chorebus lateralis
- Coelinidea elegans
- Dolopsidea indagator
- Hygroplitis rugulosus
- Laotris striatula
- Microplitis spectabilis
- Opius pygmaeator
- Phaedrotoma aethiops
- Praon abjectum
- Synelix semirugosa
- Trachionus hians
- Zele caligatus

=== Superfamily Evanioidea ===
- Gasteruptiidae 1 species
- Gasteruption jaculator

=== Superfamily Platygastroidea ===
- Platygastridae (parasitoid wasps) 65 species
- Scelionidae (parasitoid wasps) 28 species

=== Superfamily Proctotrupoidea ===
- Diapriidae (tiny wasps) 185 species including
- Ismarus dorsiger
- Heloridae 2 species
- Proctotrupidae 36 species

=== Superfamily Ceraphronoidea ===
- Ceraphronidae 6 species
- Megaspilidae 13 species

=== Superfamily Cynipoidea ===
- Figitidae (parasitoid wasps) 56 species
- Cynipidae (gall wasps / gallflies) 39 species

including

- Andricus kollari
- Andricus foecundatrix
- Andricus lignicola
- Biorhiza pallida
- Neuroterus albipes
- Neuroterus anthracinus
- Neuroterus numismalis
- Neuroterus quercusbaccarum
- Ibaliidae 1 species
