= Thrinax (disambiguation) =

Thrinax is a genus of plants in the palm family (Arecaceae). Thrinax may also refer to:

- Thrinax Konow, 1885, a genus of insects in the family Tenthredinidae, now treated as a synonym of the genus Strongylogaster
- Thrinax Pfeil, 1983, a genus of extinct sharks in the family Chlamydoselachidae, and a junior homonym of Thrinax Konow, 1885, replaced by Proteothrinax Pfeil, 2012
