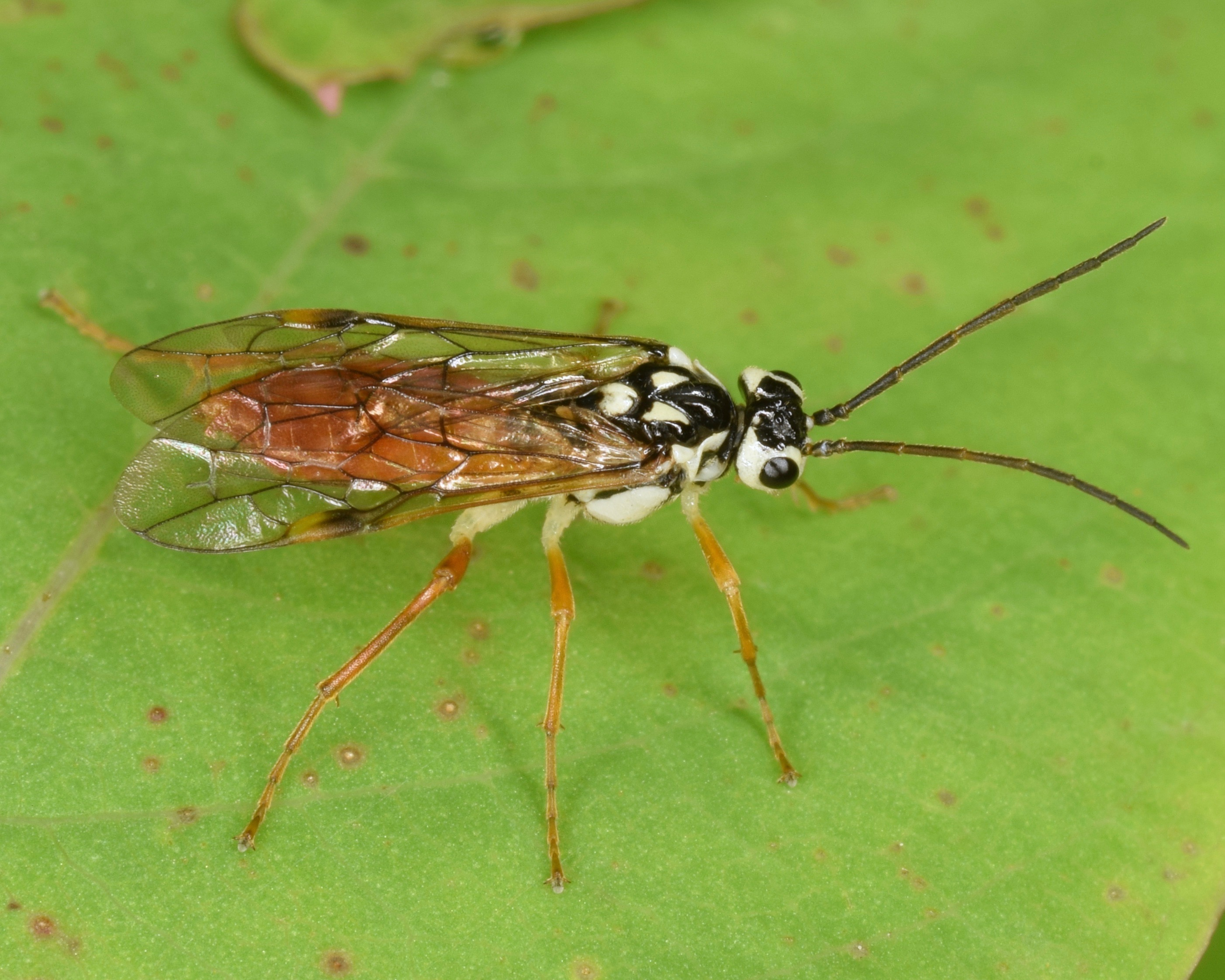
- Unidentified Aglaostigma species

Scientific classification
- Domain: Eukaryota
- Kingdom: Animalia
- Phylum: Arthropoda
- Class: Insecta
- Order: Hymenoptera
- Suborder: Symphyta
- Family: Tenthredinidae
- Genus: Aglaostigma; Kirby, 1882

Extant species
- See text

= Aglaostigma =

Genus of sawflies

Aglaostigma is a genus of sawflies belonging to the family Tenthredinidae.

The genus was described in 1882 by Kirby.

The species of this genus are found in Europe and North America.

Species:

- Aglaostigma aucupariae (Klug, 1817)
- Aglaostigma fulvipes (Scopoli, 1763)
- Aglaostigma langei
- Aglaostigma nebulosum
