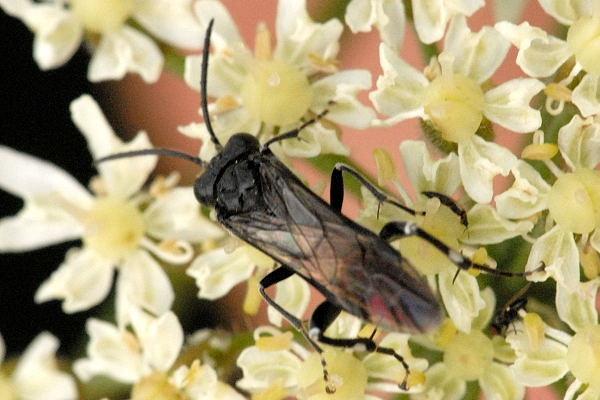
- Monophadnoides rubi

Scientific classification
- Domain: Eukaryota
- Kingdom: Animalia
- Phylum: Arthropoda
- Class: Insecta
- Order: Hymenoptera
- Suborder: Symphyta
- Family: Tenthredinidae
- Tribe: Blennocampini
- Genus: Monophadnoides; Ashmead, 1898

= Monophadnoides =

Genus of sawflies

Monophadnoides is a genus of common sawflies in the family Tenthredinidae. There are about eight described species in Monophadnoides.

== Species ==
These eight species belong to the genus Monophadnoides:

- Monophadnoides geniculatus (Hartig)^{i c g}
- Monophadnoides klausnitzeri (Muche, 1973)^{g}
- Monophadnoides osgoodi Smith, 1969^{b}
- Monophadnoides pauper (Provancher, 1882)^{b}
- Monophadnoides rubi (Harris, 1845)^{g b} (raspberry sawfly)
- Monophadnoides ruficruris (Brullé, 1832)^{g}
- Monophadnoides scytha (Konow, 1898)^{g}
- Monophadnoides smithi Togashi, 1980^{g}

Data sources: i = ITIS, c = Catalogue of Life, g = GBIF, b = Bugguide.net
