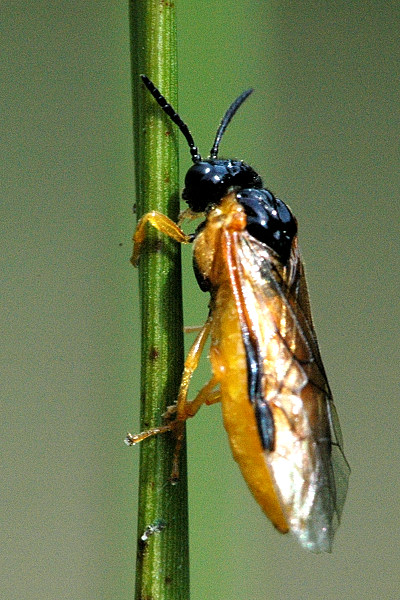
- Selandria.serva.-.lindsey

Scientific classification
- Domain: Eukaryota
- Kingdom: Animalia
- Phylum: Arthropoda
- Class: Insecta
- Order: Hymenoptera
- Suborder: Symphyta
- Family: Tenthredinidae
- Genus: Selandria; Leach, 1817

= Selandria =

Genus of sawflies

Selandria is a genus of sawflies belonging to the family Tenthredinidae.

The species of this genus are found in Europe and Northern America.

Species:

- Selandria doryca Smith, 1860
- Selandria magica Zhang, 1989
- Selandria melanosterna (Serville, 1823)
- Selandria perelegans Zhang, 1989
- Selandria plagineura Zhang, 1989
- Selandria sapindi Cockerell, 1910
- Selandria serva (Fabricius, 1793)
