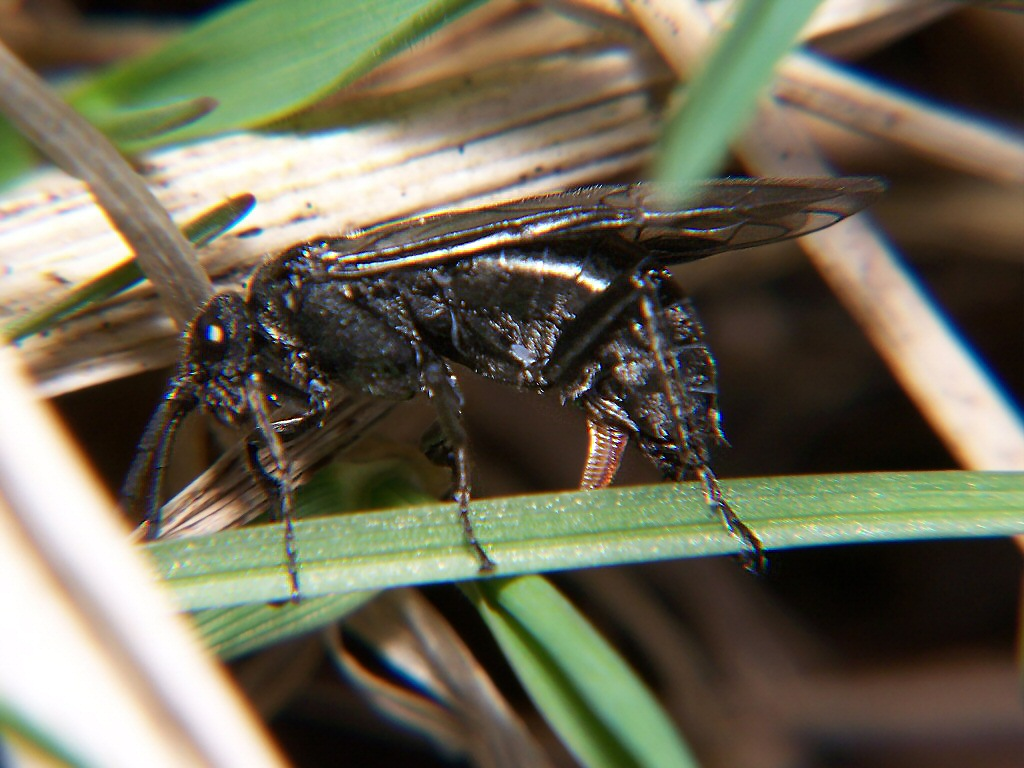
- Dolerus nitens

Scientific classification
- Kingdom: Animalia
- Phylum: Arthropoda
- Clade: Pancrustacea
- Class: Insecta
- Order: Hymenoptera
- Suborder: Symphyta
- Family: Tenthredinidae
- Genus: Dolerus; Panzer, 1801

Synonyms
- Achaetoprion Goulet, 1986; Cyperolerus Zhelochovtsev, 1988

= Dolerus =

Genus of sawflies

Dolerus is a genus of sawflies belonging to the family Tenthredinidae.

Species of the genus are mostly found in Europe, with several more in Russia to East Asia in the Palearctic realm, plus others in North America in the Nearctic.

== Species ==
The following species are recognised in the genus Dolerus:

- Dolerus aeneus Hartig, 1837
- Dolerus aericeps Thomson, 1871
- Dolerus aericepsellus Heidemaa & Mutanen, 2022
- Dolerus affinis Cameron, 1876
- Dolerus alpinus Benson, 1947
- Dolerus anthracinus (Klug, 1818)
- Dolerus anticus (Klug, 1818)
- Dolerus apricus (Norton, 1861)
- Dolerus aprilis (Norton, 1861)
- Dolerus armillatus Konow, 1896
- Dolerus asper Zaddach, 1859
- Dolerus bajulus Serville, 1823
- Dolerus bensoni P.R. Müller, 1985
- Dolerus bicolor (Palisot de Beauvois, 1809)
- Dolerus bimaculatus (Geoffroy, 1785)
- Dolerus blanki Liston, 1995
- Dolerus brevicornis Zaddach, 1859
- Dolerus cameroni W.F. Kirby, 1882 [for homonym Dolerus bicolor Cameron, 1876]
- Dolerus coracinus (Klug, 1818)
- Dolerus coreanus Takeuchi, 1927
- Dolerus coruscans Konow, 1890 (synonym in some schemes)
- Dolerus cothurnatus Lepeletier, 1823
- Dolerus cothurnatus Serville, 1823
- Dolerus elderi Kincaid, 1900
- Dolerus ephippiatus F. Smith, 1874
- Dolerus eversmanni W.F. Kirby, 1882
- Dolerus ferrugatus Serville, 1823
- Dolerus flavopictus Matsumura, 1912
- Dolerus frigidus Benson, 1965
- Dolerus frisoni Ross, 1931
- Dolerus fumosus Stephens, 1835
- Dolerus genucinctus Zaddach, 1859
- Dolerus germanicus (Fabricius, 1775)
- Dolerus gessneri André, 1880
- Dolerus gibbosus Hartig, 1837
- Dolerus gilvipes (Klug, 1818)
- Dolerus gonager (Fabricius, 1771)
- Dolerus haematodes (Schrank, 1781)
- Dolerus harwoodi Benson, 1947
- Dolerus harukawai Waterston, 1926
- Dolerus hibernicus Lacourt, 1988
- Dolerus honshuensis Haris, 2001
- Dolerus hordei Rohwer, 1925
- Dolerus incisus Goulet, 1986
- Dolerus japonicus Kirby, 1882
- Dolerus junci (Stephens, 1935)
- Dolerus konowi MacGillivray, 1914
- Dolerus kurodakensis Haris, 2001
- Dolerus laevigatus Hellén, 1955
- Dolerus lewisii Cameron, 1887
- Dolerus liogaster Thomson, 1871
- Dolerus madidus (Klug, 1818)
- Dolerus nasutus MacGillivray, 1923
- Dolerus nauticus MacGillivray, 1923
- Dolerus neoaprilis MacGillivray, 1908
- Dolerus neocollaris MacGillivray, 1908
- Dolerus niger (Linnaeus, 1767)
- Dolerus nigratus (O.F. Müller, 1776)
- Dolerus nimbosus MacGillivray, 1923
- Dolerus nitens Zaddach, 1859
- Dolerus nivatus MacGillivray, 1923
- Dolerus nocuus MacGillivray, 192
- Dolerus pachycerus Hartig, 1837
- Dolerus picipes (Klug, 1818)
- Dolerus planatus Hartig, 1837
- Dolerus possilensis Cameron, 1882
- Dolerus pratensis (Linnaeus, 1758)
- Dolerus pratorum (Fallén, 1808)
- Dolerus pseudoanticus Malaise, 1931
- Dolerus puncticollis Thomson, 1871
- Dolerus rhodogaster Zhelochovtsev, 1935
- Dolerus rubrosignalis Haris, 2001
- Dolerus sanguinicollis (Klug, 1818)
- Dolerus schmidti Konow, 1884
- Dolerus schulthessi Konow, 1887
- Dolerus sericeus Say, 1824
- Dolerus stygius Foerster, 1860
- Dolerus subarcticus Hellén, 1956
- Dolerus subfasciatus F. Smith, 1874
- Dolerus takaosanensis Haris, 2001
- Dolerus tejoniensis (Norton, 1861)
- Dolerus tibialis Cresson, 1880
- Dolerus triplicatus (Klug, 1818)
- Dolerus uliginosus (Klug, 1818)
- Dolerus unicolor (Palisot de Beauvois, 1809)
- Dolerus varispinus Hartig, 1837
- Dolerus vestigialis (Klug, 1818)
- Dolerus vulneratus Mocsáry, 1878
- Dolerus yokohamensis Rohwer, 1925
- Dolerus yukonensis Norton, 1872
- Dolerus zhelochovtsevi Heidemaa & Viitasaari, 2009
