= Mesoneura =

Scientific classification
- Kingdom: Animalia
- Phylum: Arthropoda
- Clade: Pancrustacea
- Class: Insecta
- Order: Hymenoptera
- Suborder: Symphyta
- Family: Tenthredinidae
- Genus: Mesoneura; Hartig, 1837

Genus of sawflies

Mesoneura is a genus of sawflies belonging to the family Tenthredinidae.

The species of this genus are found in Europe, Eastern Asia and North America.

Species:

- Mesoneura lanigera Benson, 1954
- Mesoneura nigrostigmata Haris, 2001
- Mesoneura opaca (Fabricius, 1775)
- Mesoneura shishikuensis Togashi, 1965
- Mesoneura tematinensis Roller, 2023
