= Amauronematus =

Scientific classification
- Domain: Eukaryota
- Kingdom: Animalia
- Phylum: Arthropoda
- Class: Insecta
- Order: Hymenoptera
- Suborder: Symphyta
- Family: Tenthredinidae
- Genus: Amauronematus; Konow, 1890

Extant species
- See text

Genus of sawflies

Amauronematus is a genus of sawflies belonging to the family Tenthredinidae.

The genus was described in 1890 by Friedrich Wilhelm Konow.

The genus has cosmopolitan distribution.

Species:

- Amauronematus amplus
- Amauronematus fasciatus
- Amauronematus histrio
- Amauronematus lateralis
- Amauronematus mcluckiei
- Amauronematus mundus
- Amauronematus neglectus
- Amauronematus sagmarius
- Amauronematus semilacteus
- Amauronematus stenogaster
- Amauronematus toeniatus
- Amauronematus vittatus
- Amauronematus viduatus
- Amauronematus puniceus
