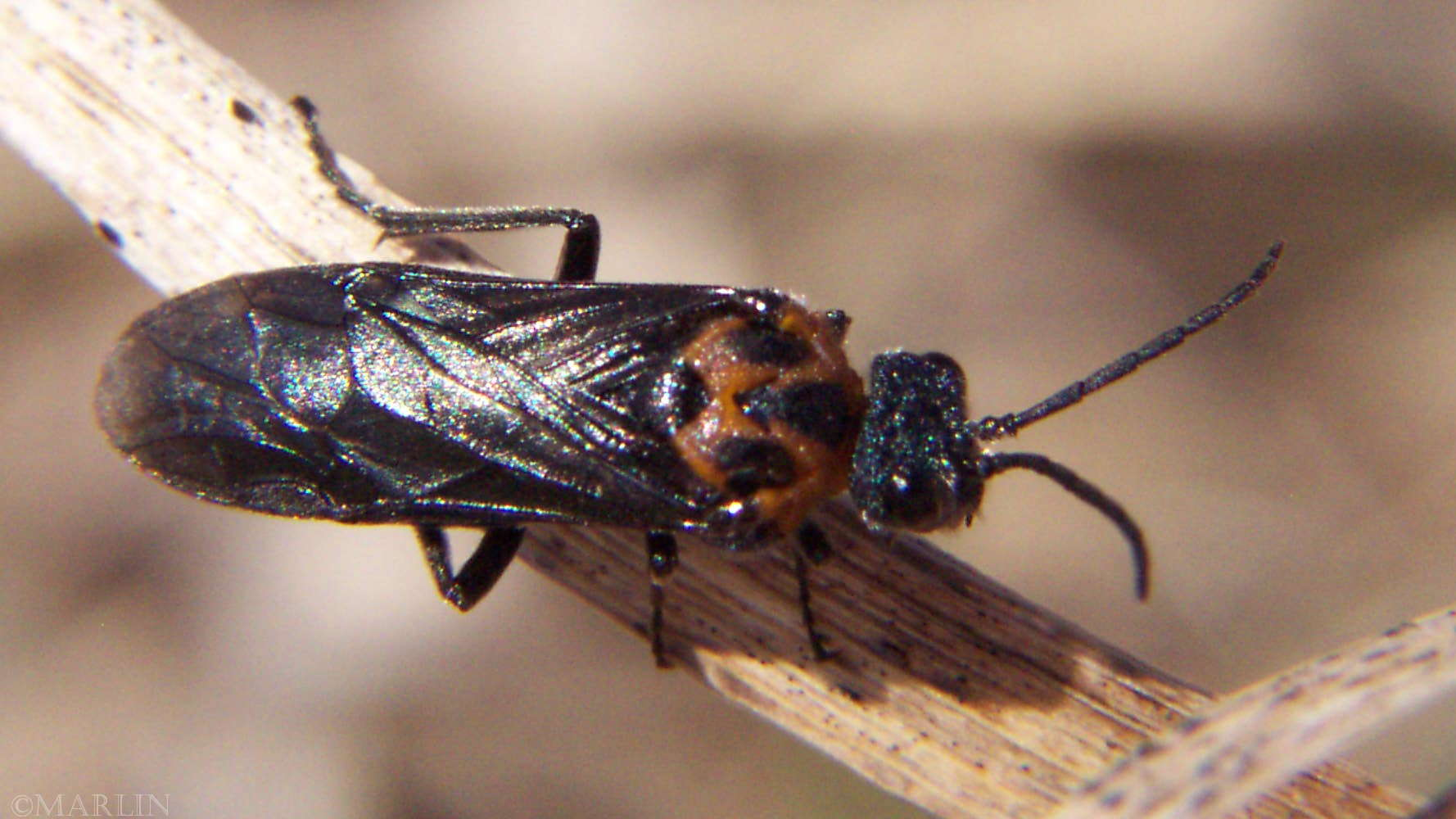

Scientific classification
- Kingdom: Animalia
- Phylum: Arthropoda
- Class: Insecta
- Order: Hymenoptera
- Suborder: Symphyta
- Family: Tenthredinidae
- Genus: Dolerus
- Species: D. unicolor

Binomial name
- Dolerus unicolor (Palisot de Beauvois, 1809)

= Dolerus unicolor =

Species of sawfly

Dolerus unicolor, commonly known as the early sawfly, is a species of sawfly that is found in North America.
