= Sterictiphora =

Scientific classification
- Domain: Eukaryota
- Kingdom: Animalia
- Phylum: Arthropoda
- Class: Insecta
- Order: Hymenoptera
- Suborder: Symphyta
- Family: Argidae
- Genus: Sterictiphora; Billberg, 1820

Synonyms
- Schizocera Lepeletier, 1825; Schizocerus Berthold, 1827 (Missp.); Schizocerus Lepeletier & Serville, 1828 (Preocc.); Schyzocera Latreille, 1829 (Missp.); Schizocera Guérin, 1834 (Preocc.); Cyphona Dahlbom, 1835; Schizoceros Konow, 1899 (Missp.); Shizocera Auctt. (Missp.)

Genus of insects

Sterictiphora is a Holarctic genus of sawflies belonging to the family Argidae.

== Selected species ==
- Sterictiphora angelicae (Panzer, 1799)
- Sterictiphora cruenta Smith, 1969
- Sterictiphora denticula Koch, 1988
- Sterictiphora furcata (Villers, 1789)
- Sterictiphora gastrica (Klug, 1814)
- Sterictiphora geminata (Gmelin, 1790)
- Sterictiphora hannemanni Koch, 1988
- Sterictiphora koreana Lee & Wei, 2016
- Sterictiphora longicornis Chevin, 1982
- Sterictiphora maura (Cresson, 1880)
- Sterictiphora notensis Togashi, 1968
- Sterictiphora procera Koch, 1988
- Sterictiphora prunivorus (Dyar, 1897)
- Sterictiphora rugosa Lee & Wei, 2016
- Sterictiphora sericeus (Norton, 1867)
- Sterictiphora serotina Smith, 1969
- Sterictiphora sorbi Kontuniemi, 1966
- Sterictiphora tanoi Togashi, 1997
- Sterictiphora transversa Smith, 1969
