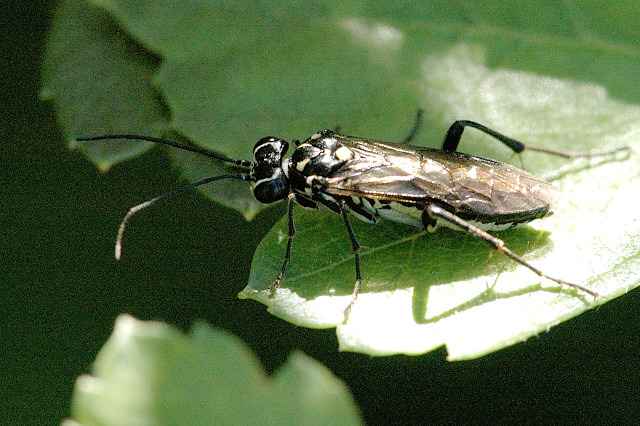
- Pachyprotasis rapae

Scientific classification
- Domain: Eukaryota
- Kingdom: Animalia
- Phylum: Arthropoda
- Class: Insecta
- Order: Hymenoptera
- Suborder: Symphyta
- Family: Tenthredinidae
- Tribe: Macrophyini
- Genus: Pachyprotasis; Hartig T., 2012

= Pachyprotasis =

Genus of sawflies

Pachyprotasis is a genus of common sawflies in the family Tenthredinidae. There are at least 40 described species in Pachyprotasis.

== Species ==
These 48 species belong to the genus Pachyprotasis:

- Pachyprotasis alboannulata Forsius, 1935^{g}
- Pachyprotasis antennata (Klug, 1817)^{g}
- Pachyprotasis bicoloricornis Wei & Nie, 2002^{g}
- Pachyprotasis bilineata Zhong & Wei^{g}
- Pachyprotasis chenghanhuai Wei & Zhong, 2006^{g}
- Pachyprotasis cinctulata Wei & Zhong, 2002^{g}
- Pachyprotasis coximaculata Zhong & Wei^{g}
- Pachyprotasis coxipunctata Zhong & Wei^{g}
- Pachyprotasis daochengensis Wei & Zhong, 2007^{g}
- Pachyprotasis eleviscutellis Wei & Nie, 1999^{g}
- Pachyprotasis emdeni Forsius, 1931^{g}
- Pachyprotasis erratica Smith, 1874^{g}
- Pachyprotasis flavocapita Wei & Zhong, 2002^{g}
- Pachyprotasis formosana Rohwer, 1916^{g}
- Pachyprotasis fulvocoxis Wei & Zhong, 2002^{g}
- Pachyprotasis fulvomaculata Wei & Zhong, 2002^{g}
- Pachyprotasis hengshani Zhong & Wei^{g}
- Pachyprotasis indica^{g}
- Pachyprotasis insularis Malaise, 1945^{g}
- Pachyprotasis longicornis Jakowlew, 1891^{g}
- Pachyprotasis maculopediba Wei & Zhong, 2002^{g}
- Pachyprotasis maculopleurita Wei & Zhong, 2002^{g}
- Pachyprotasis maculoscutellata Zhong & Wei^{g}
- Pachyprotasis maculotergitis Zhu & Wei, 2008^{g}
- Pachyprotasis mai Zhong & Wei, 2013^{g}
- Pachyprotasis melanosoma Wei & Zhong, 2002^{g}
- Pachyprotasis micromaculata Wei, 1998^{g}
- Pachyprotasis nanlingia Wei, 2006^{g}
- Pachyprotasis nigroclypeata Wei, 1998^{g}
- Pachyprotasis nigronotata Kriechbaumer, 1874^{g}
- Pachyprotasis nitididorsata Wei & Zhong, 2002^{g}
- Pachyprotasis pailongensis Zhong & Wei^{g}
- Pachyprotasis pallidistigma Malaise, 1931^{g}
- Pachyprotasis pleurochroma Malaise, 1945^{g}
- Pachyprotasis qilianica Zhong & Wei^{g}
- Pachyprotasis qinlingica Wei, 1998^{g}
- Pachyprotasis rapae (Linnaeus, 1767)^{g b}
- Pachyprotasis rubiapicilia Wei & Nie, 1999^{g}
- Pachyprotasis rubiginosa Wei & Nie, 1999^{g}
- Pachyprotasis rufocephala Wei, 2005^{g}
- Pachyprotasis rufocinctilia Wei, 1998^{g}
- Pachyprotasis shennongjiai Zhong & Wei^{g}
- Pachyprotasis sichuanensis Zhong & Wei^{g}
- Pachyprotasis simulans (Klug, 1817)^{g}
- Pachyprotasis variegata (Fallén, 1808)^{g}
- Pachyprotasis versicolor Cameron, 1876^{g}
- Pachyprotasis xibei Zhong & Wei, 2013^{g}
- Pachyprotasis zhoui Wei & Zhong, 2007^{g}

Data sources: i = ITIS, c = Catalogue of Life, g = GBIF, b = Bugguide.net
