= Fenella (sawfly) =

Scientific classification
- Domain: Eukaryota
- Kingdom: Animalia
- Phylum: Arthropoda
- Class: Insecta
- Order: Hymenoptera
- Suborder: Symphyta
- Family: Tenthredinidae
- Genus: Fenella; Westwood, 1839

Genus of sawflies

Fenella is a genus of sawflies belonging to the family Tenthredinidae.

== Species ==
- Fenella arenariae
- Fenella catenata
- Fenella continuata
- Fenella nigrita
