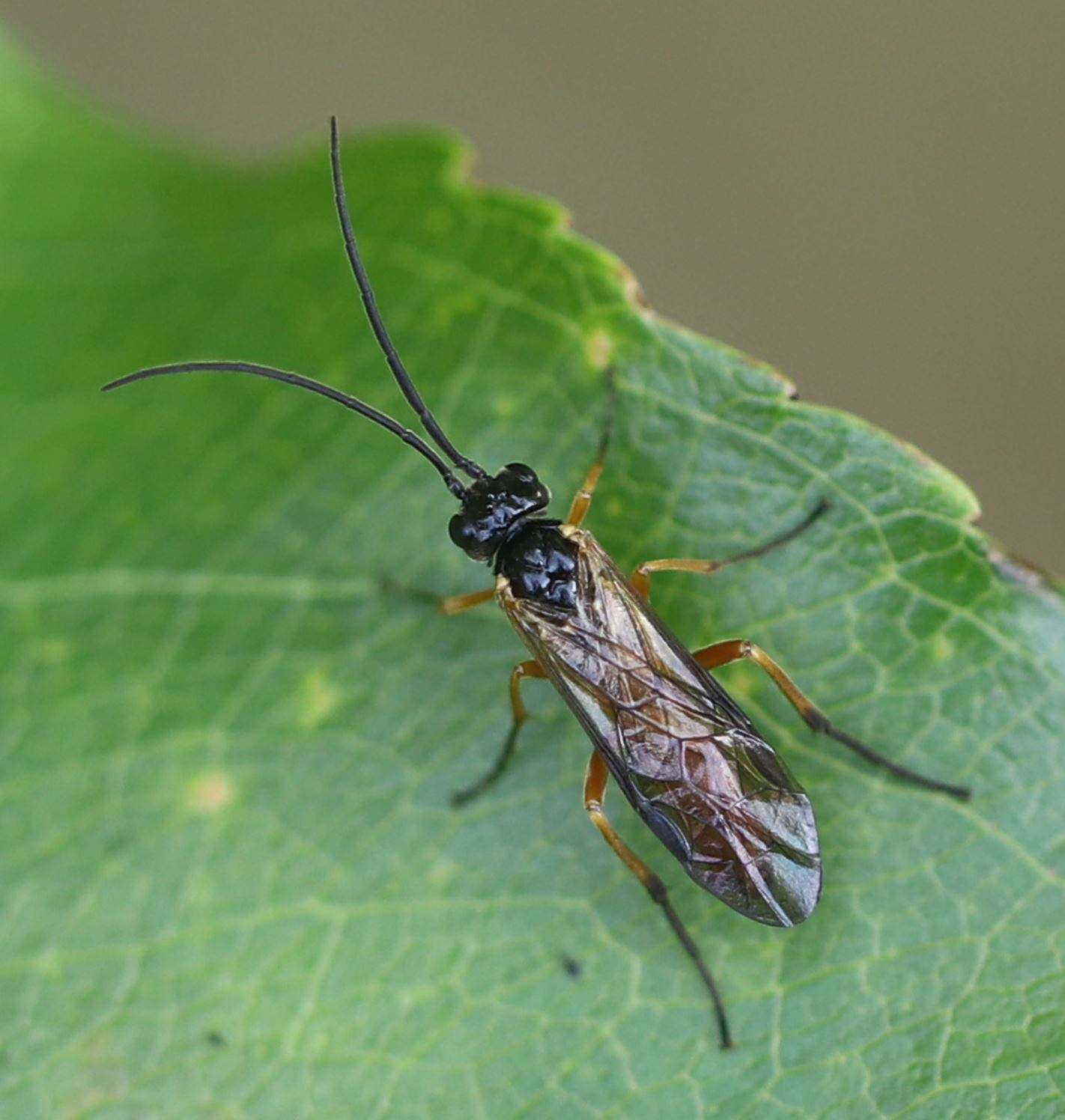
- Apethymus filiformis

Scientific classification
- Kingdom: Animalia
- Phylum: Arthropoda
- Clade: Pancrustacea
- Class: Insecta
- Order: Hymenoptera
- Suborder: Symphyta
- Family: Tenthredinidae
- Genus: Apethymus; Benson, 1939

= Apethymus =

Genus of sawflies

Apethymus is a genus of sawflies in the family Tenthredinidae.

== Taxonomy ==
The genus was erected by Benson in 1939.

=== Species ===
- Apethymus apicalis
- Apethymus filiformis
- Apethymus serotinus
