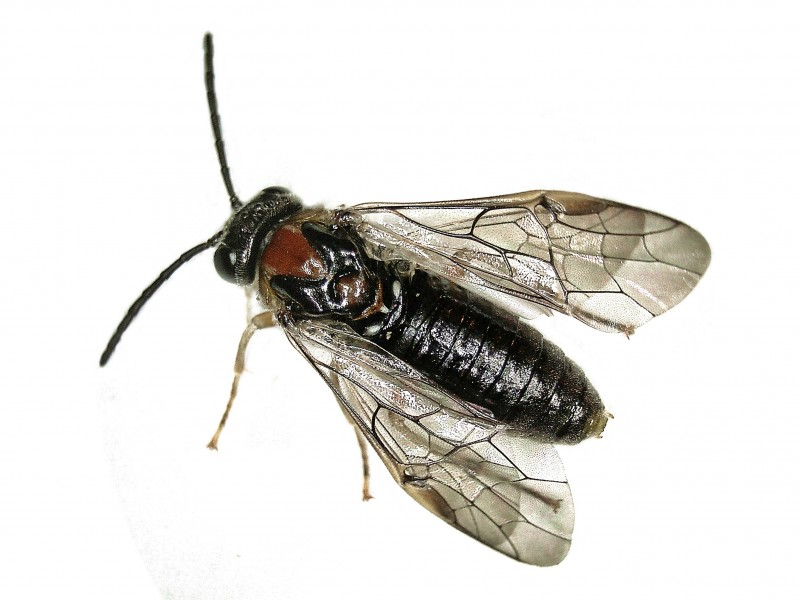
- Mesoneura opaca Elst, Gelderland, the Netherlands

Scientific classification
- Domain: Eukaryota
- Kingdom: Animalia
- Phylum: Arthropoda
- Class: Insecta
- Order: Hymenoptera
- Suborder: Symphyta
- Family: Tenthredinidae
- Genus: Mesoneura
- Species: M. opaca

Binomial name
- Mesoneura opaca (Fabricius, 1775)

= Mesoneura opaca =

Species of sawfly

Mesoneura opaca is a Palearctic species of sawfly.
