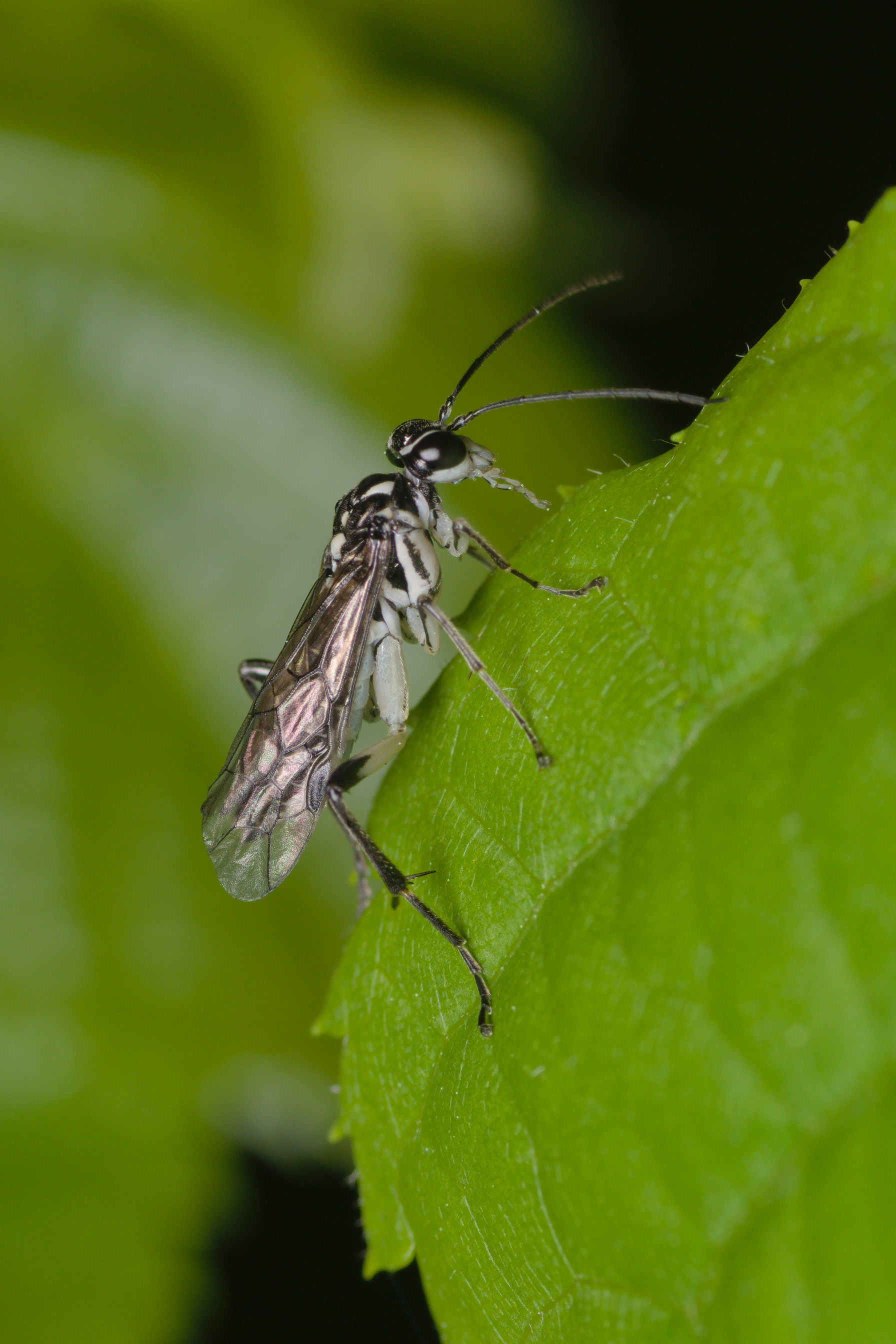

Scientific classification
- Kingdom: Animalia
- Phylum: Arthropoda
- Class: Insecta
- Order: Hymenoptera
- Suborder: Symphyta
- Family: Tenthredinidae
- Genus: Pachyprotasis
- Species: P. rapae

Binomial name
- Pachyprotasis rapae (Linnaeus, 1767)

= Pachyprotasis rapae =

Species of sawfly

Pachyprotasis rapae is a species of common sawfly in the family Tenthredinidae.
