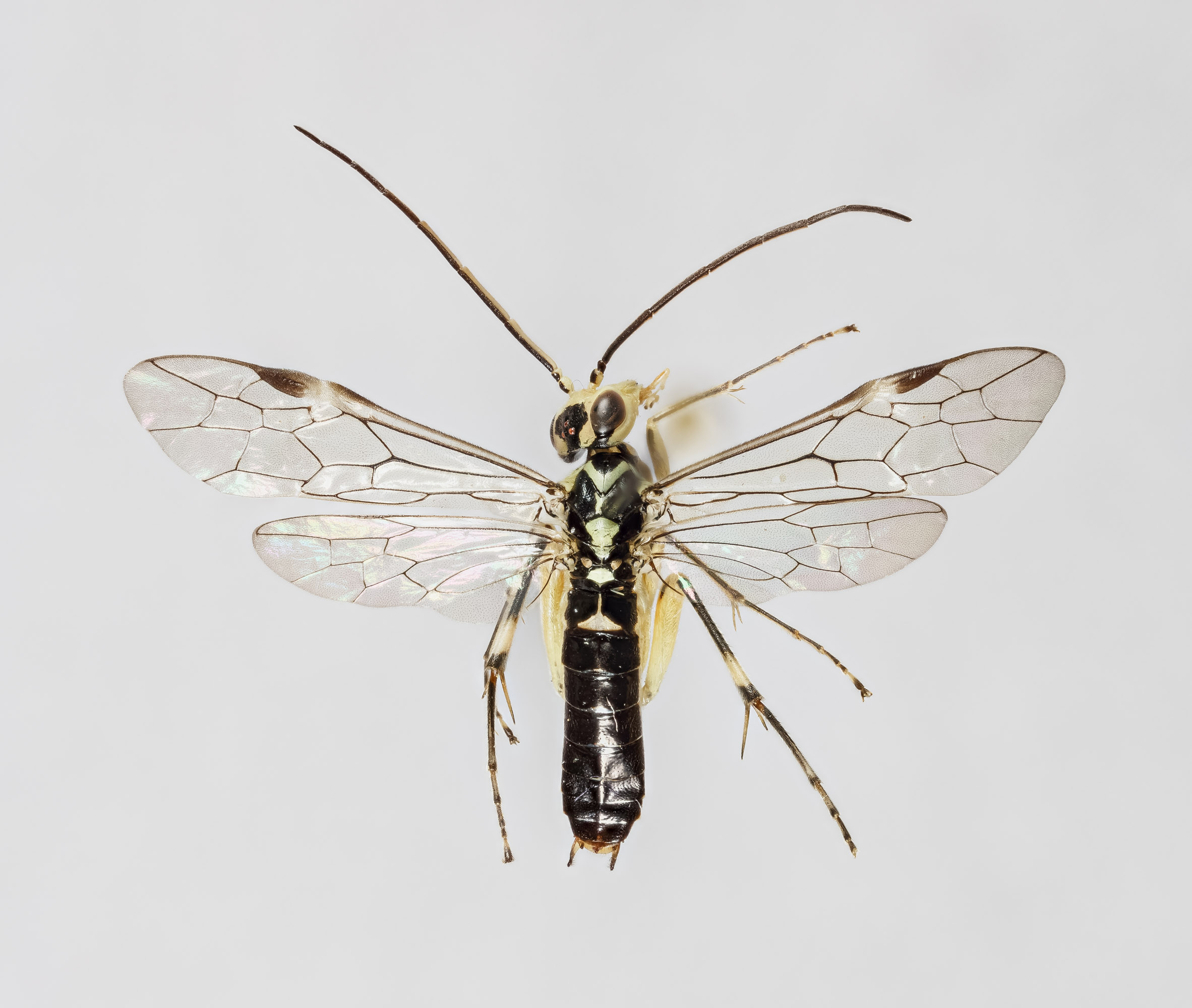
- Pachyprotasis antennata Norway

Scientific classification
- Domain: Eukaryota
- Kingdom: Animalia
- Phylum: Arthropoda
- Class: Insecta
- Order: Hymenoptera
- Suborder: Symphyta
- Family: Tenthredinidae
- Genus: Pachyprotasis
- Species: P. antennata

Binomial name
- Pachyprotasis antennata (Klug, 1817)

= Pachyprotasis antennata =

Species of sawfly

Pachyprotasis antennata is a Palearctic species of sawfly.
