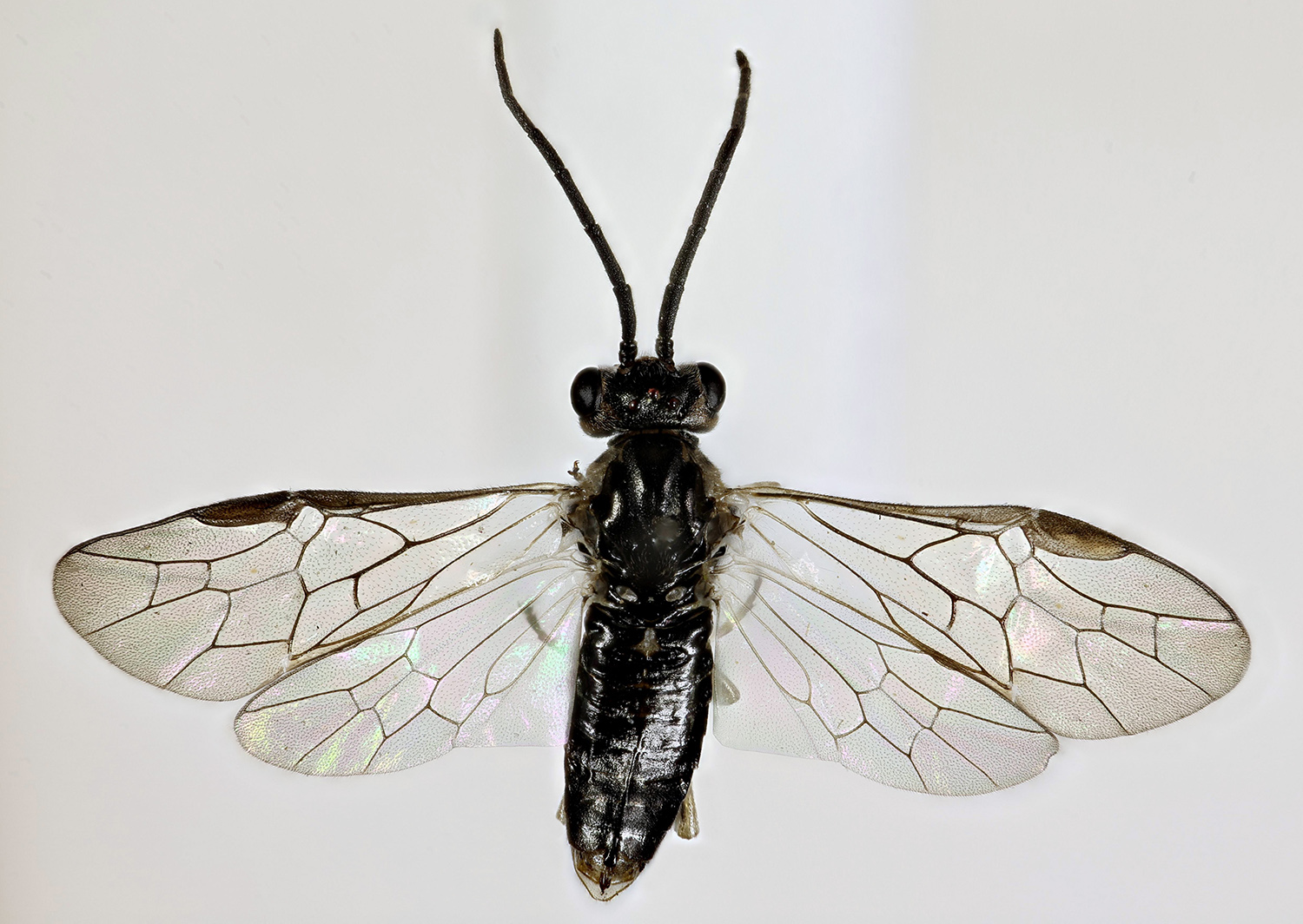
- Amauronematus lateralis, Deeside, North Wales

Scientific classification
- Domain: Eukaryota
- Kingdom: Animalia
- Phylum: Arthropoda
- Class: Insecta
- Order: Hymenoptera
- Suborder: Symphyta
- Family: Tenthredinidae
- Genus: Amauronematus
- Species: A. lateralis

Binomial name
- Amauronematus lateralis Konow, 1896

Synonyms
- Amauronematus (Amauronematus) trautmanni Enslin, 1919; Euura trautmanni (Enslin, 1919)

= Amauronematus lateralis =

Species of sawfly

Amauronematus lateralis is a Palearctic species of sawfly.
