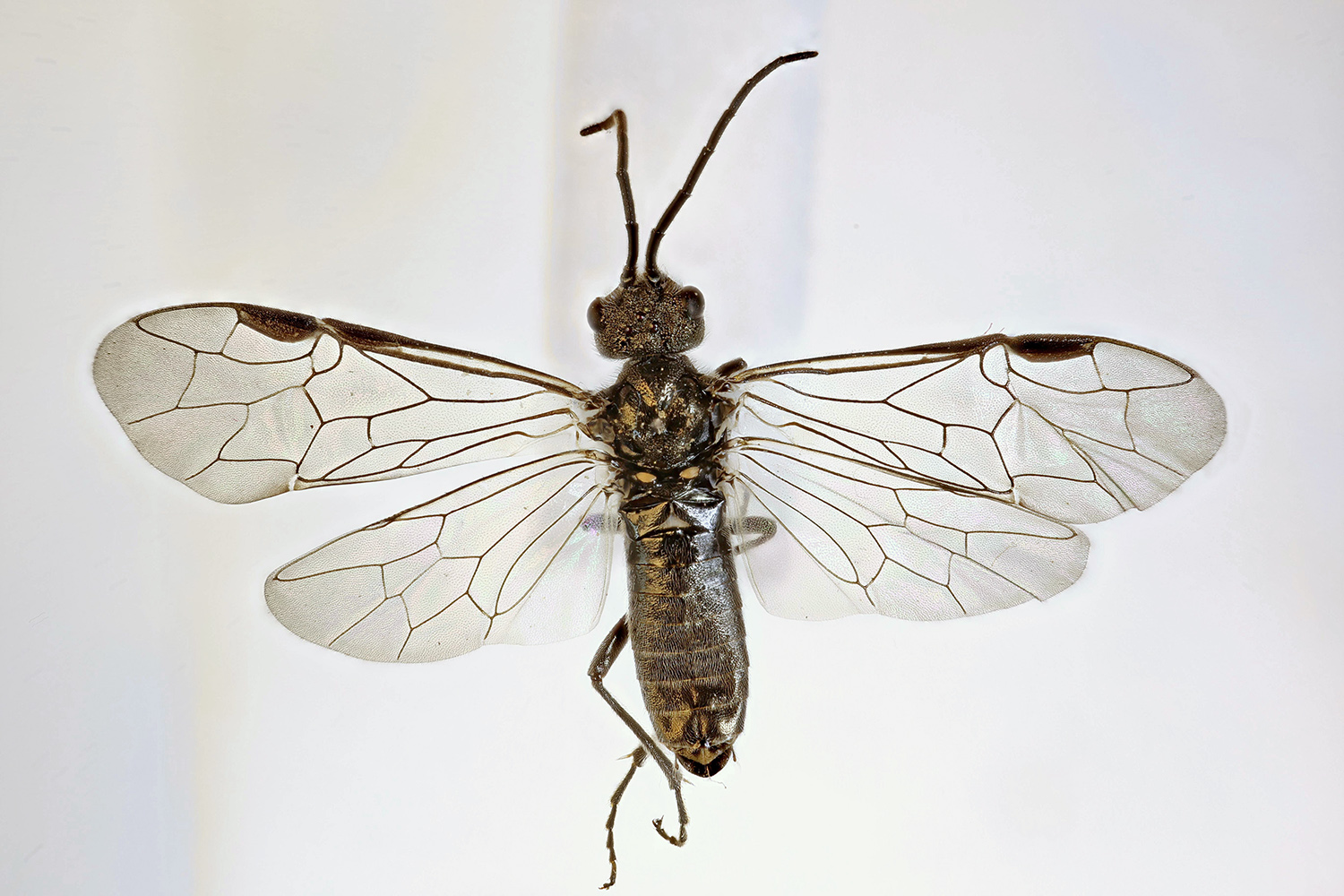
- Dolerus picipes, Halkyn Mountain, North Wales

Scientific classification
- Kingdom: Animalia
- Phylum: Arthropoda
- Class: Insecta
- Order: Hymenoptera
- Suborder: Symphyta
- Family: Tenthredinidae
- Genus: Dolerus
- Species: D. picipes

Binomial name
- Dolerus picipes (Klug ,1818)

= Dolerus picipes =

Species of sawfly

Dolerus picipes is a Palearctic species of sawfly.
