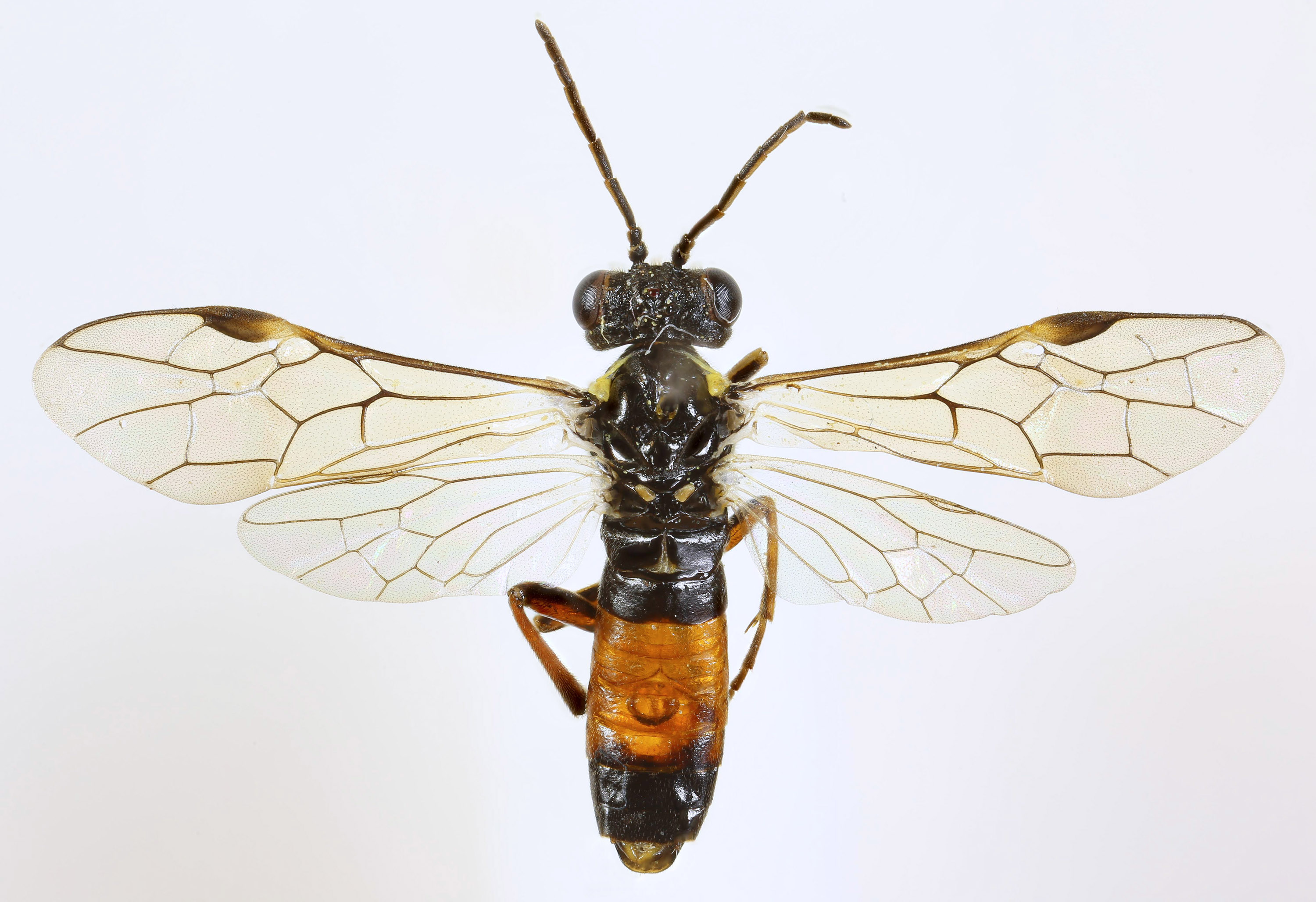
- Aglaostigma aucupariae, Pystyll Gwyn quarry, North Wales

Scientific classification
- Kingdom: Animalia
- Phylum: Arthropoda
- Clade: Pancrustacea
- Class: Insecta
- Order: Hymenoptera
- Suborder: Symphyta
- Family: Tenthredinidae
- Genus: Aglaostigma
- Species: A. aucupariae

Binomial name
- Aglaostigma aucupariae (Klug, 1817)

= Aglaostigma aucupariae =

Species of sawfly

Aglaostigma aucupariae is a Palearctic species of sawfly.
