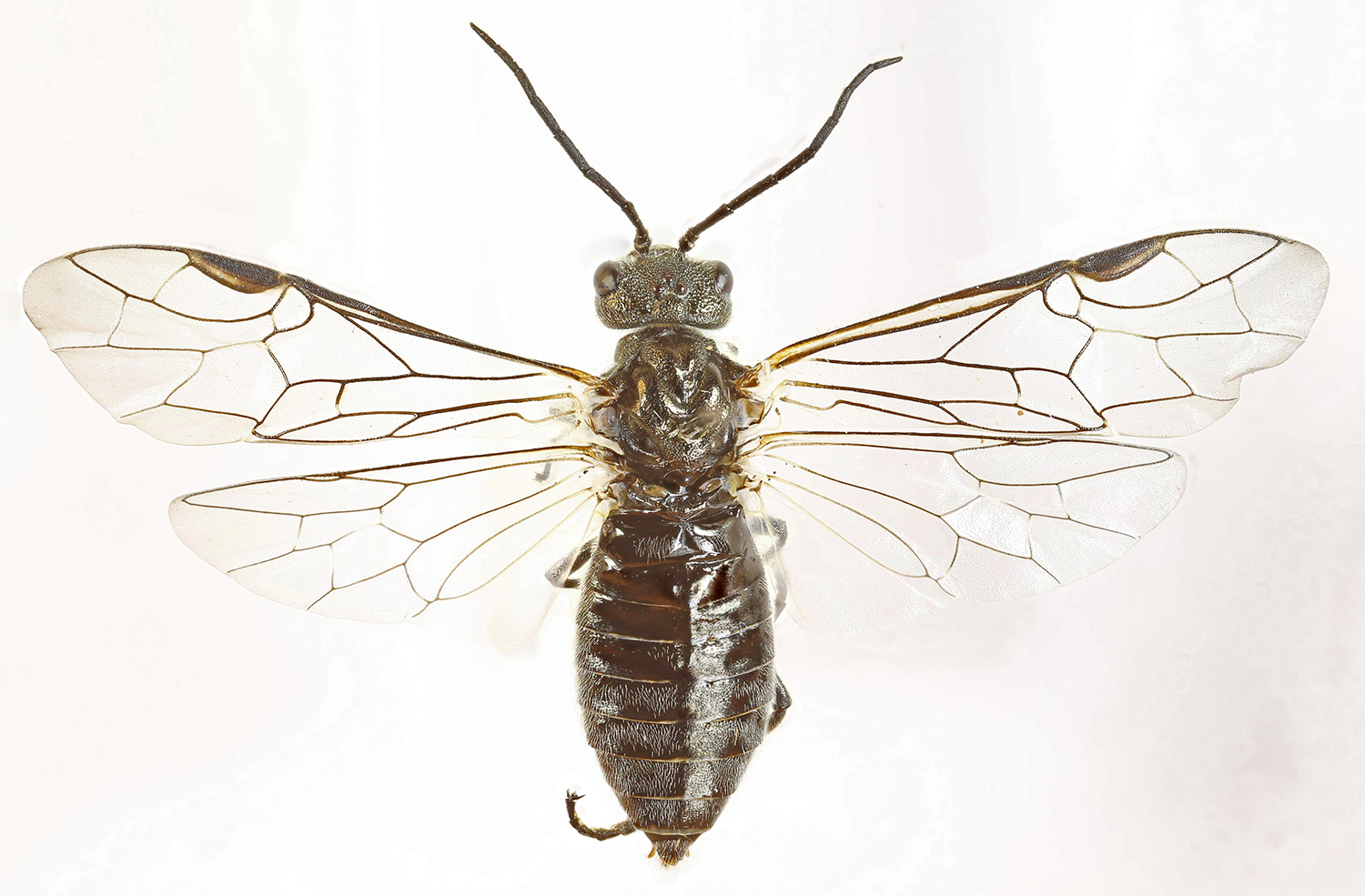
- Dolerus aeneus female North Wales

Scientific classification
- Kingdom: Animalia
- Phylum: Arthropoda
- Class: Insecta
- Order: Hymenoptera
- Suborder: Symphyta
- Family: Tenthredinidae
- Genus: Dolerus
- Species: D. aeneus

Binomial name
- Dolerus aeneus Hartig, 1837

= Dolerus aeneus =

Species of sawfly

Dolerus aeneus is a Palearctic species of sawfly.
