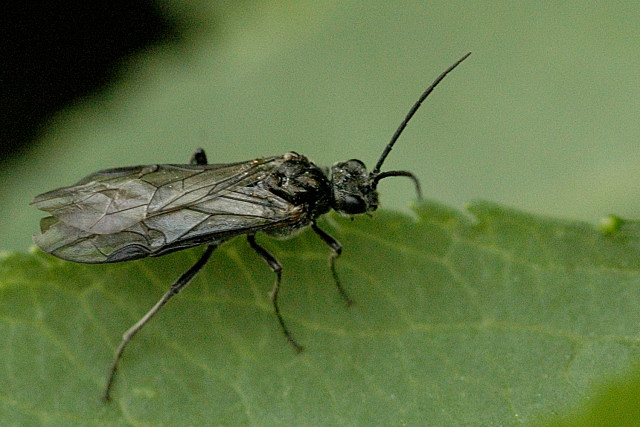
- Dolerus varispinus Ardennes

Scientific classification
- Domain: Eukaryota
- Kingdom: Animalia
- Phylum: Arthropoda
- Class: Insecta
- Order: Hymenoptera
- Suborder: Symphyta
- Family: Tenthredinidae
- Genus: Dolerus
- Species: D. varispinus

Binomial name
- Dolerus varispinus Hartig, 1837

= Dolerus varispinus =

Species of sawfly

Dolerus varispinus is a Palearctic species of sawfly.
