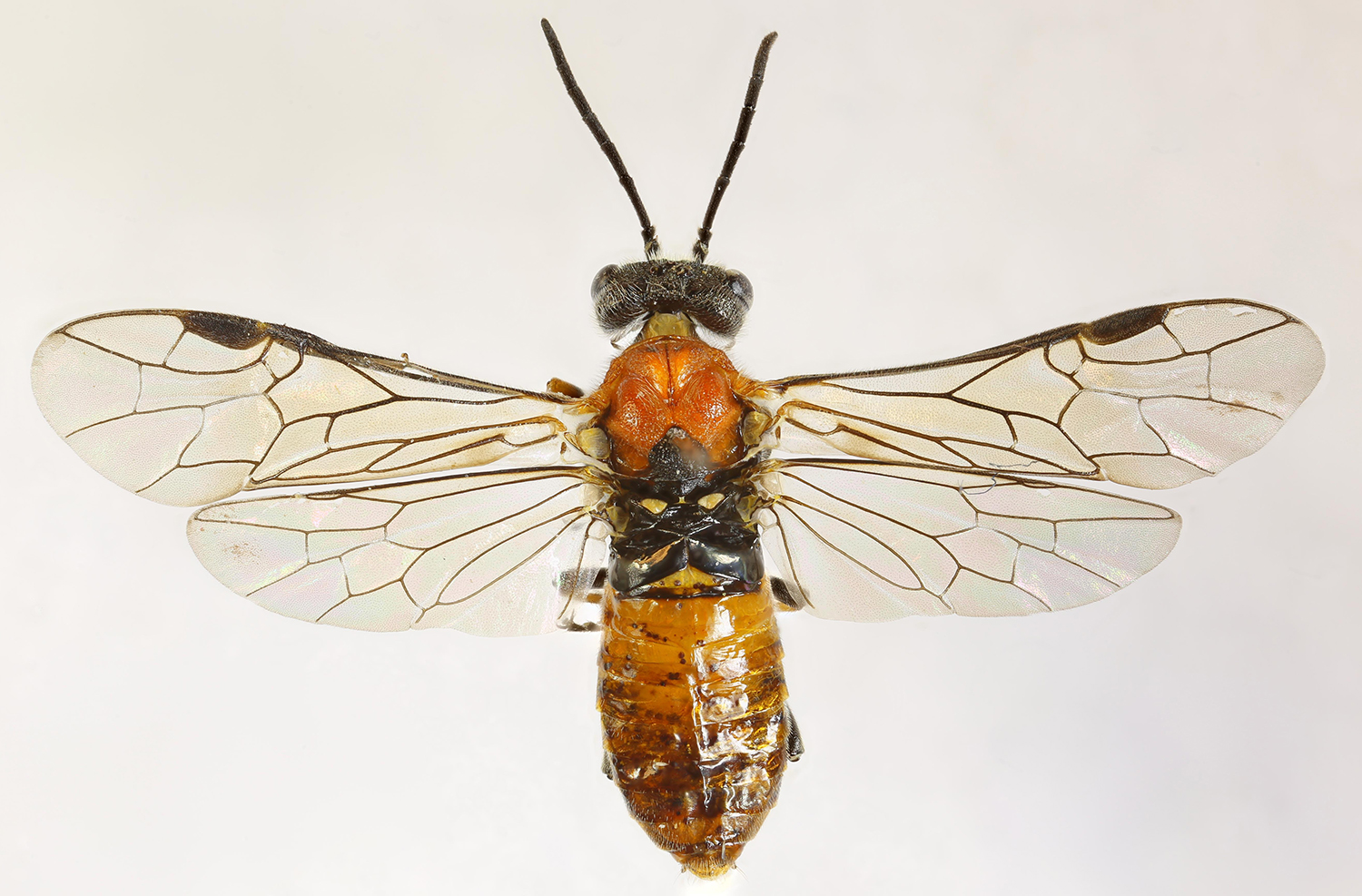
- Dolerus bajulus female, Dyffryn North Wales

Scientific classification
- Domain: Eukaryota
- Kingdom: Animalia
- Phylum: Arthropoda
- Class: Insecta
- Order: Hymenoptera
- Suborder: Symphyta
- Family: Tenthredinidae
- Genus: Dolerus
- Species: D. bajulus

Binomial name
- Dolerus bajulus Serville, 1823

Synonyms
- Dolerus aericeps Thomson, 1871

= Dolerus bajulus =

Species of sawfly

Dolerus bajulus is a Palearctic species of sawfly.
