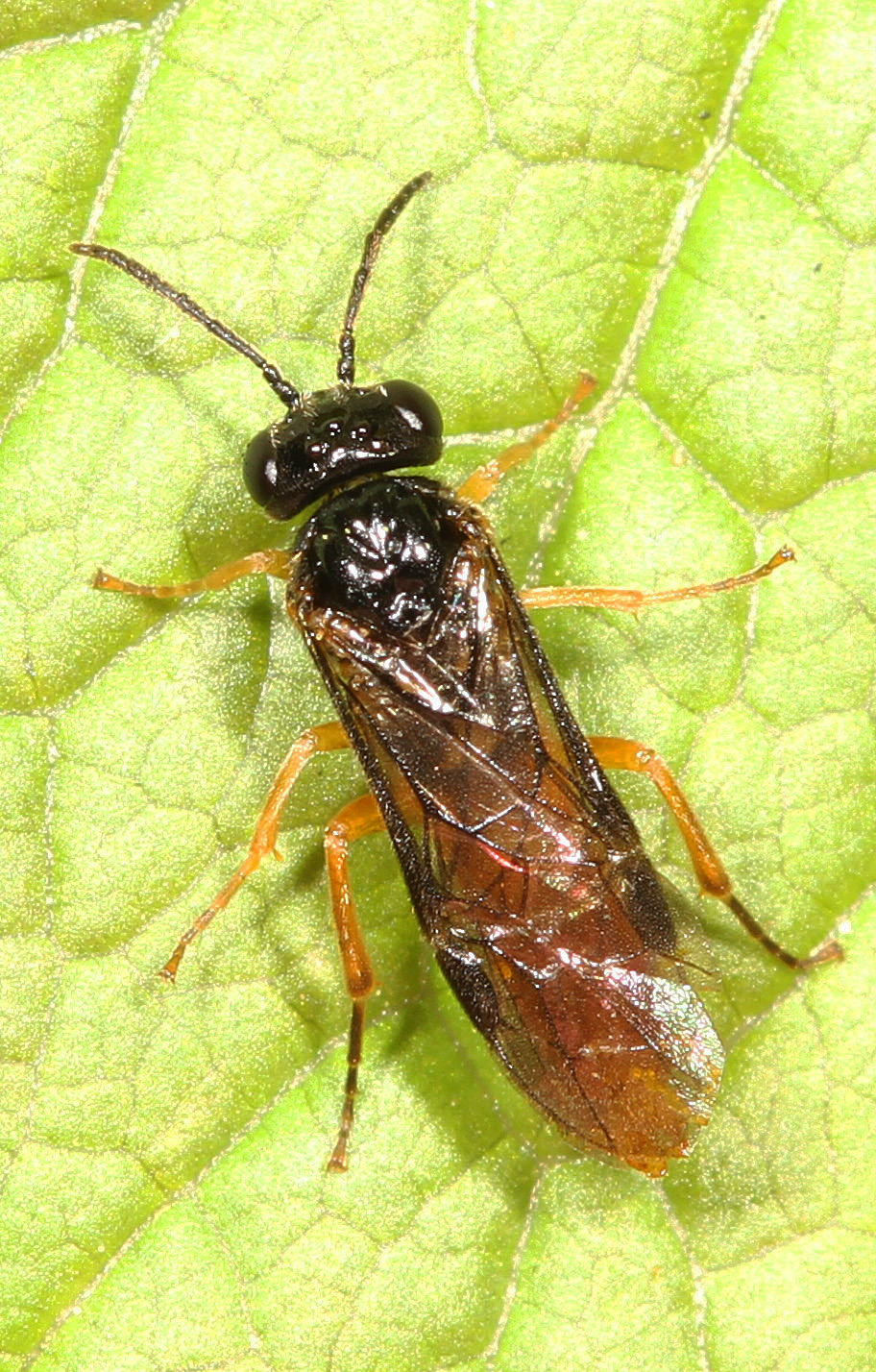
- Halidamia affinis Carderock Park, Carderock, Maryland

Scientific classification
- Domain: Eukaryota
- Kingdom: Animalia
- Phylum: Arthropoda
- Class: Insecta
- Order: Hymenoptera
- Suborder: Symphyta
- Family: Tenthredinidae
- Genus: Halidamia
- Species: H. affinis

Binomial name
- Halidamia affinis (Fallen, 1807)

= Halidamia affinis =

Species of sawfly

Halidamia affinis is a Palearctic species of sawfly.
