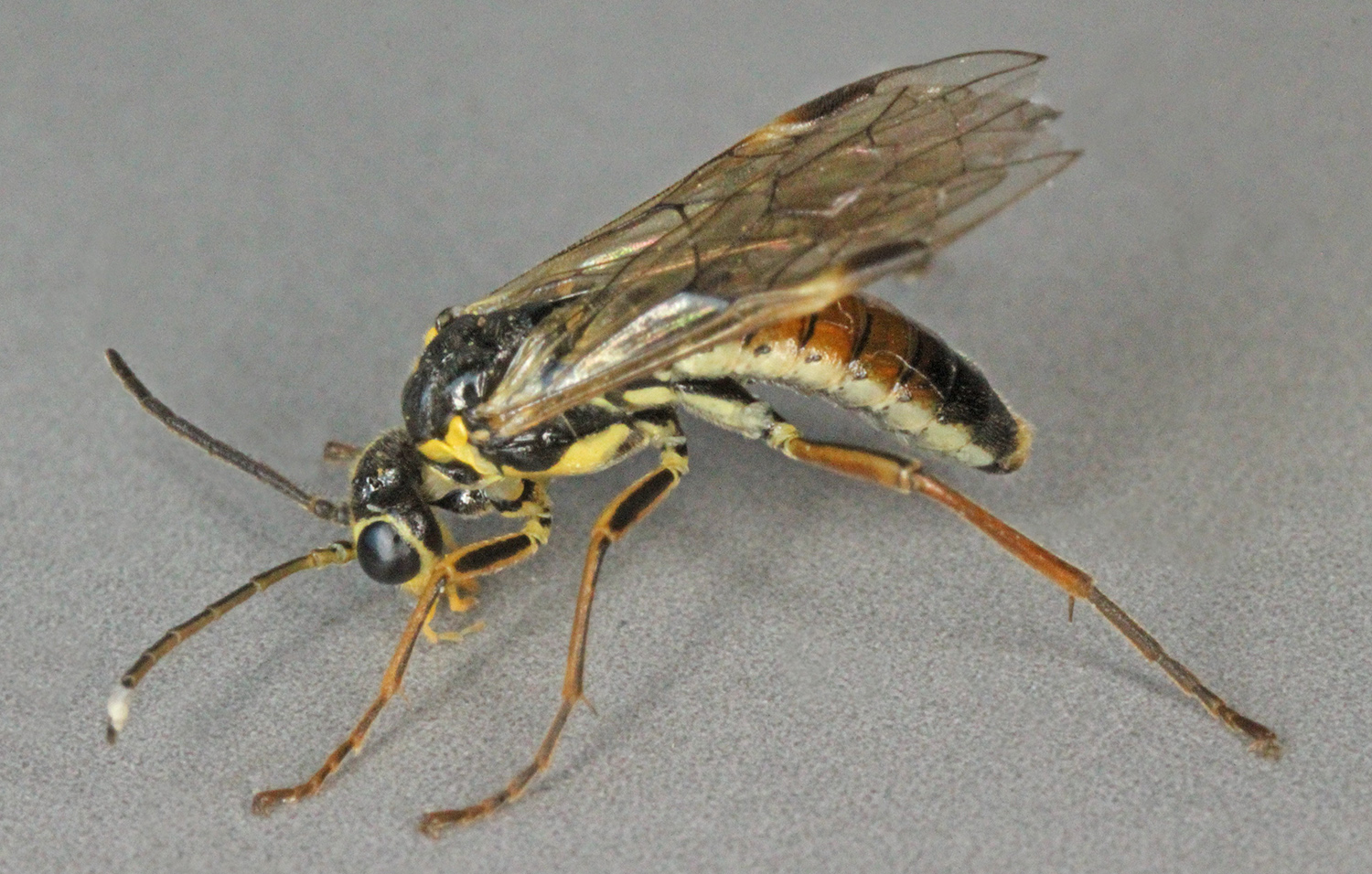
- Aglaostigma fulvipes, Sontley, North Wales

Scientific classification
- Kingdom: Animalia
- Phylum: Arthropoda
- Clade: Pancrustacea
- Class: Insecta
- Order: Hymenoptera
- Suborder: Symphyta
- Family: Tenthredinidae
- Genus: Aglaostigma
- Species: A. fulvipes

Binomial name
- Aglaostigma fulvipes (Scopoli, 1763)

= Aglaostigma fulvipes =

Species of sawfly

Aglaostigma fulvipes is a Palearctic species of sawfly.
