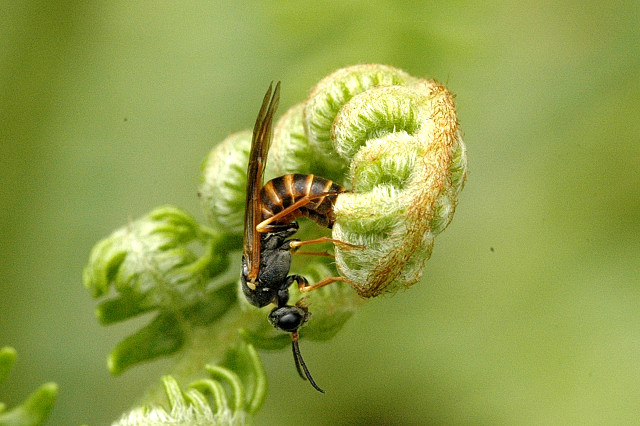
- Strongylogaster multifasciata

Scientific classification
- Domain: Eukaryota
- Kingdom: Animalia
- Phylum: Arthropoda
- Class: Insecta
- Order: Hymenoptera
- Suborder: Symphyta
- Family: Tenthredinidae
- Genus: Strongylogaster; Dahlbom, 1835

= Strongylogaster =

Genus of sawflies

Strongylogaster is a genus of insects belonging to the family Tenthredinidae.

Species (incomplete, here mostly European and North American):

- Strongylogaster abdominalis (Takeuchi, 1928)
- Strongylogaster baikalensis Naito, 1990
- Strongylogaster cretensis Konow, 1887
- Strongylogaster empriaeformis (Malaise, 1931)
- Strongylogaster distans Norton, 1868
- Strongylogaster filicis (Klug, 1817)
- Strongylogaster formosana (Rohwer, 1916)
- Strongylogaster fulva Naito & Huang, 1982
- Strongylogaster impressata Provancher, 1878
- Strongylogaster lata D.R. Smith and Naito, 1995
- Strongylogaster macula (Klug, 1817)
- Strongylogaster mixta (Klug, 1817)
- Strongylogaster multicincta Norton, 1862)
- Strongylogaster multifasciata (Geoffroy, 1785)
- Strongylogaster nantouensis Naito, 1990
- Strongylogaster polita Cresson, 1880
- Strongylogaster remota Rohwer, 1912
- Strongylogaster rufigastra (Kincaid, 1900)
- Strongylogaster struthiopteridis (Malaise, 1931)
- Strongylogaster soriculatipes Cresson, 1880
- Strongylogaster tacita (Norton, 1860)
- Strongylogaster tianmunica Li, Liu & Wei, 2021
- Strongylogaster tibialis Cresson, 1880
- Strongylogaster tuberculiceps Rohwer, 1911/12
- Strongylogaster xanthocera (Stephens, 1835)
