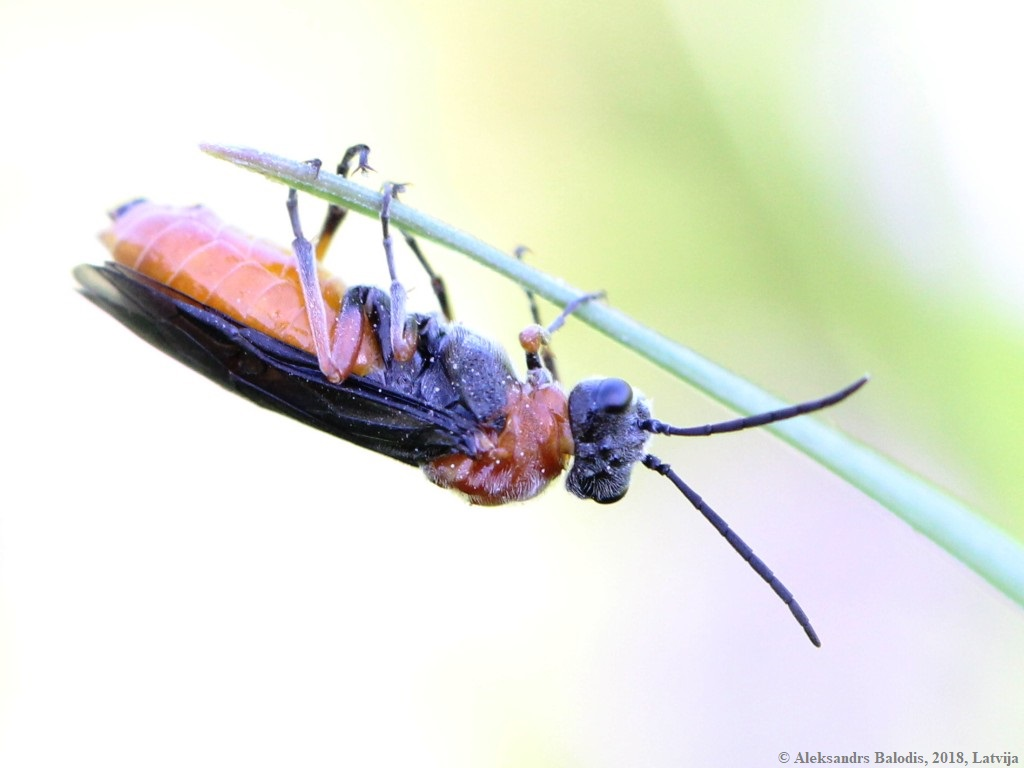
- Dolerus germanicus Latvia

Scientific classification
- Domain: Eukaryota
- Kingdom: Animalia
- Phylum: Arthropoda
- Class: Insecta
- Order: Hymenoptera
- Suborder: Symphyta
- Family: Tenthredinidae
- Genus: Dolerus
- Species: D. germanicus

Binomial name
- Dolerus germanicus (Fabricius, 1775)

= Dolerus germanicus =

Species of sawfly

Dolerus germanicus is a Palearctic species of sawfly.
