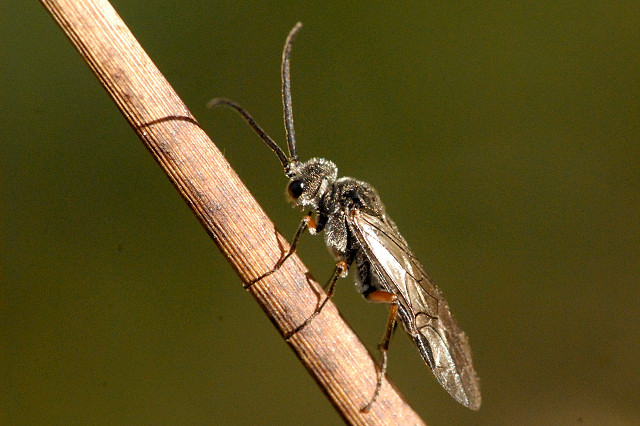
- Dolerus vestigialis Ardennes

Scientific classification
- Domain: Eukaryota
- Kingdom: Animalia
- Phylum: Arthropoda
- Class: Insecta
- Order: Hymenoptera
- Suborder: Symphyta
- Family: Tenthredinidae
- Genus: Dolerus
- Species: D. vestigialis

Binomial name
- Dolerus vestigialis (Klug, 1818)

= Dolerus vestigialis =

Species of sawfly

Dolerus vestigialis is a Palearctic species of sawfly.
