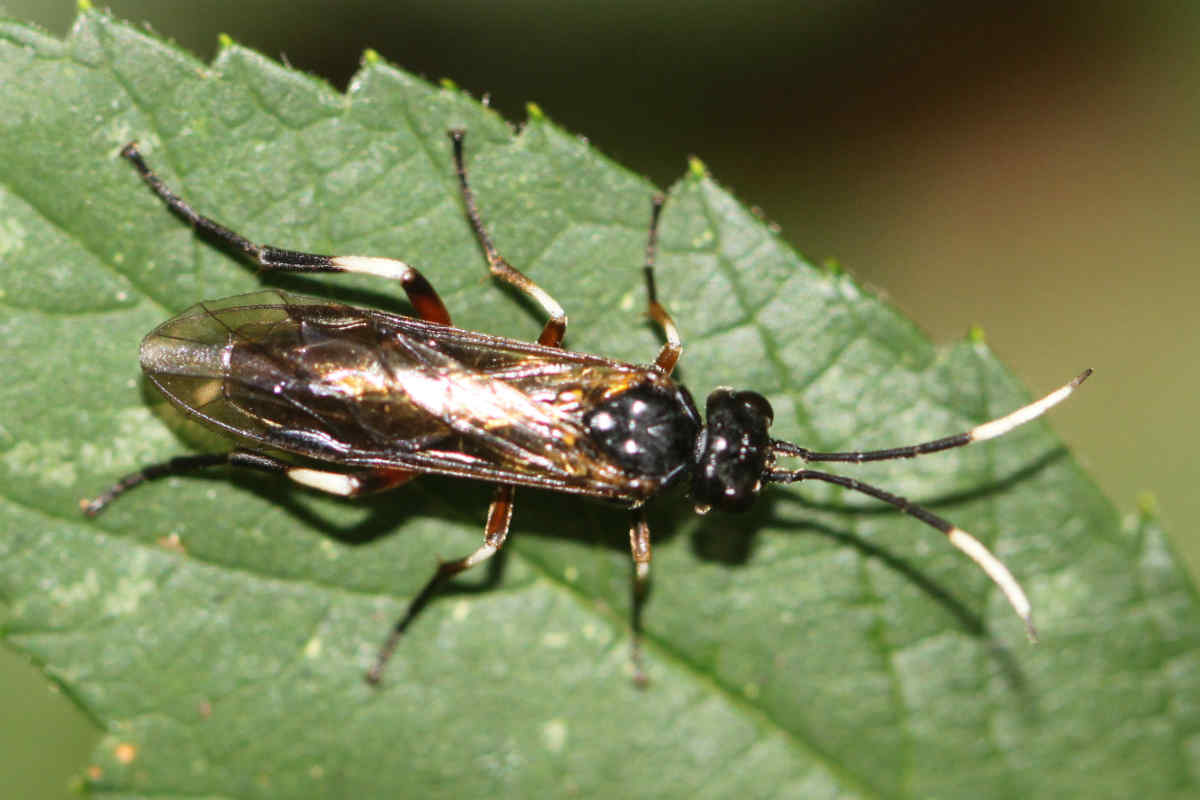
- Apethymus serotinus Schwetzinger Hardt Germany

Scientific classification
- Domain: Eukaryota
- Kingdom: Animalia
- Phylum: Arthropoda
- Class: Insecta
- Order: Hymenoptera
- Suborder: Symphyta
- Family: Tenthredinidae
- Genus: Apethymus
- Species: A. serotinus

Binomial name
- Apethymus serotinus (O. F. Müller, 1776)

Synonyms
- Tenthredo serotinus O. F. Muller, 1776; Tenthredo braccata Gmelin, 1790; Tenthredo tibialis Panzer, 1799; Apethymus braccata; Apethymus tibialis

= Apethymus serotinus =

Species of sawfly

Apethymus serotinus is a Palearctic species of sawfly.
