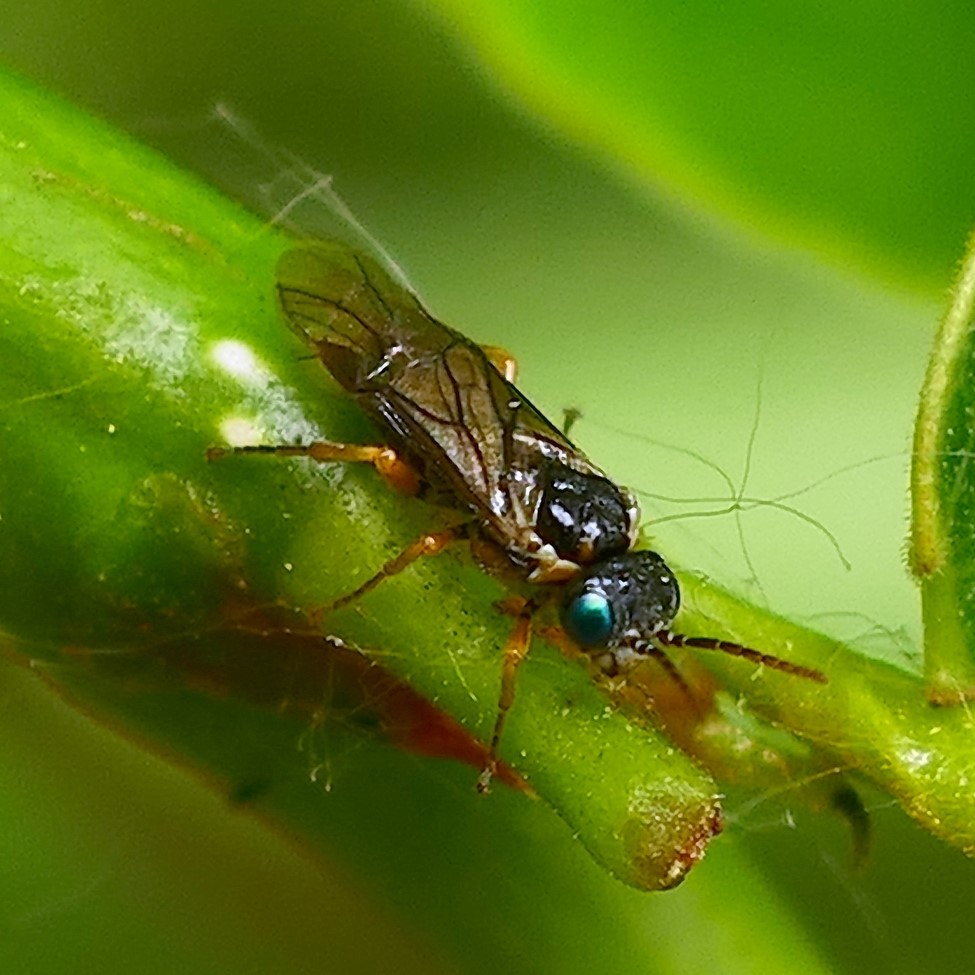

Scientific classification
- Kingdom: Animalia
- Phylum: Arthropoda
- Class: Insecta
- Order: Hymenoptera
- Suborder: Symphyta
- Family: Tenthredinidae
- Genus: Fenusella
- Species: F. hortulana

Binomial name
- Fenusella hortulana (Klug, 1818)

= Fenusella hortulana =

Species of sawfly

Fenusella hortulana is a Palearctic species of sawfly.
