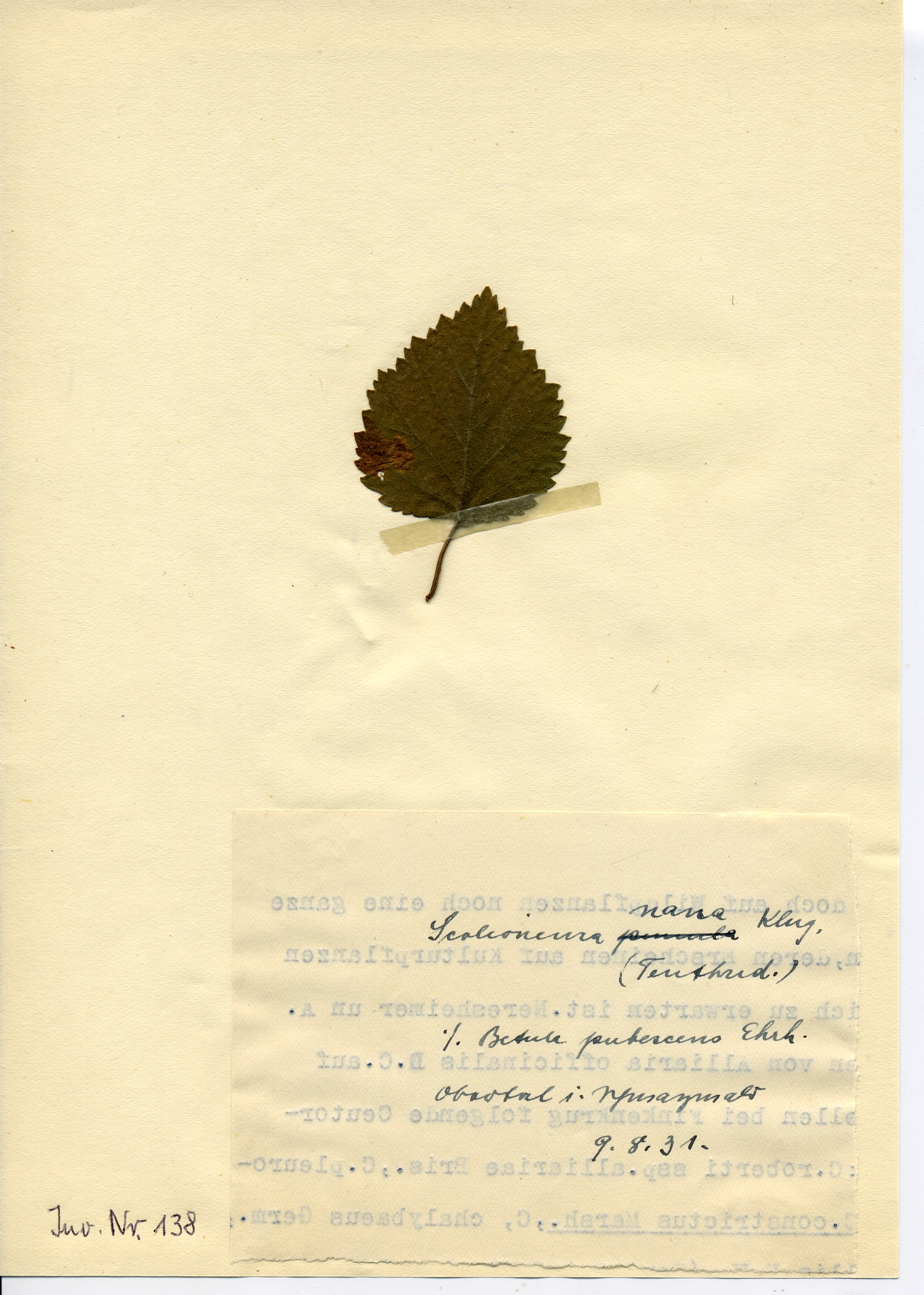
- Fenusella nana leafmine specimen from Museum Wiesbaden

Scientific classification
- Kingdom: Animalia
- Phylum: Arthropoda
- Class: Insecta
- Order: Hymenoptera
- Suborder: Symphyta
- Family: Tenthredinidae
- Genus: Fenusella
- Species: F. nana

Binomial name
- Fenusella nana (Klug, 1816)

Synonyms
- Tenthredo nana Klug, 1816; Tenthredo mellita Newman, 1870; Tenthredo quercus Cameron, 1885; Tenthredo laeta Enslin, 1918

= Fenusella nana =

Species of sawfly

Fenusella nana is a Palearctic species of sawfly. It occurs throughout the British Isles.
