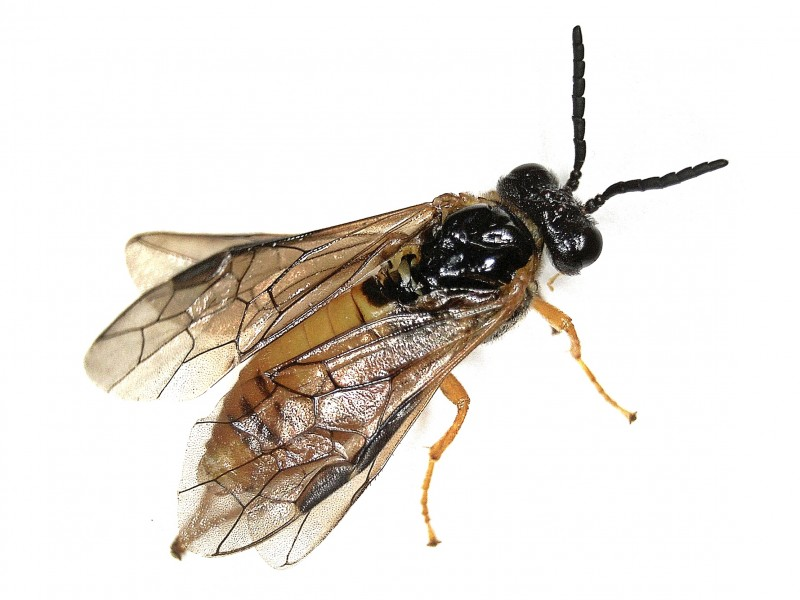
- Selandria serva Nijmegen, the Netherlands

Scientific classification
- Kingdom: Animalia
- Phylum: Arthropoda
- Class: Insecta
- Order: Hymenoptera
- Suborder: Symphyta
- Family: Tenthredinidae
- Genus: Selandria
- Species: S. serva

Binomial name
- Selandria serva (Fabricius, 1793)

= Selandria serva =

Species of sawfly

Selandria serva is a Palearctic species of Hymenopteran insects, more specifically the sawfly, belonging to the Tenthredinidae family. This species can be found in the Portuguese territory.
