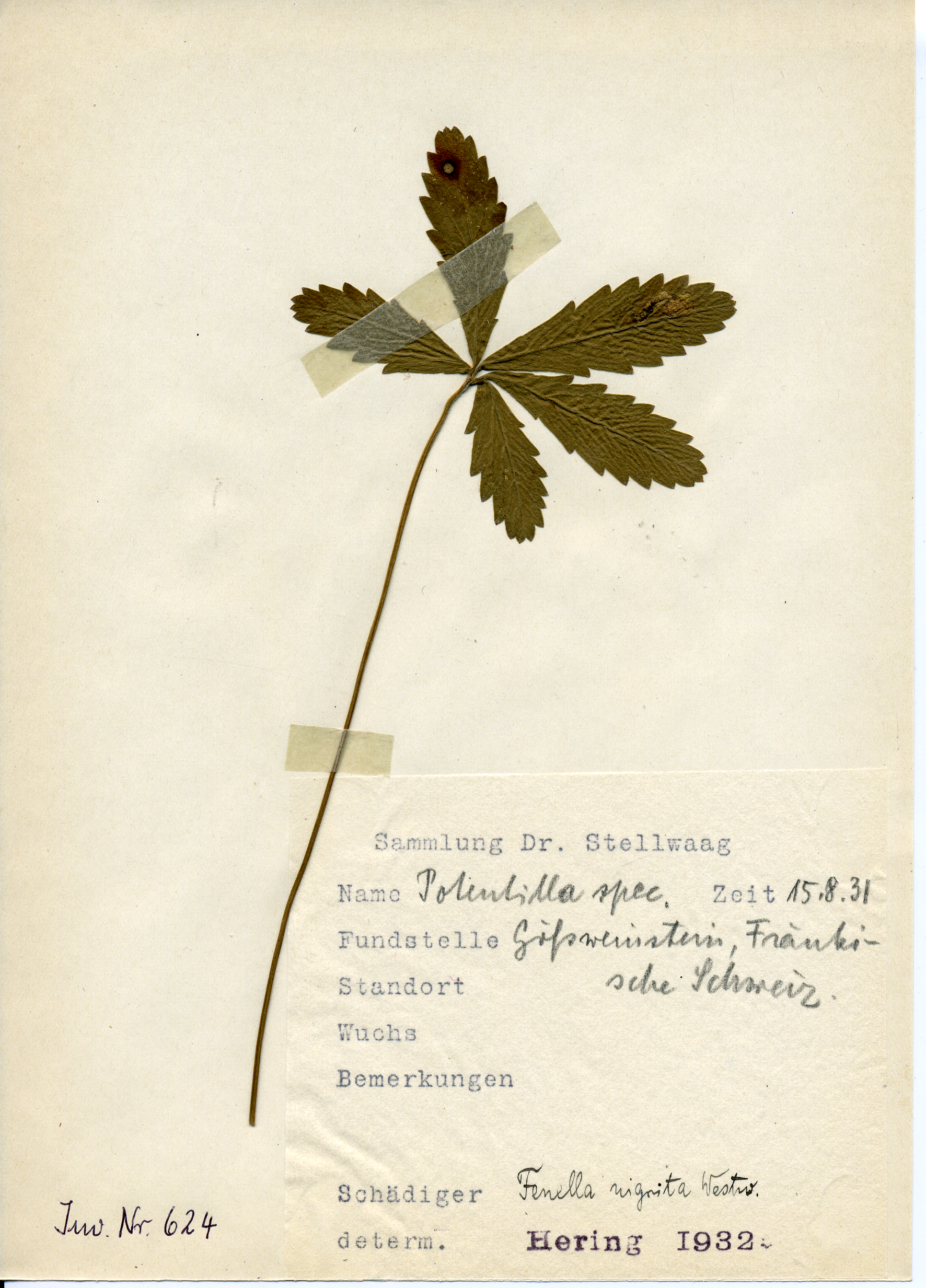
- Fenella nigrita leafmine Museum Wiesbaden

Scientific classification
- Kingdom: Animalia
- Phylum: Arthropoda
- Clade: Pancrustacea
- Class: Insecta
- Order: Hymenoptera
- Suborder: Symphyta
- Family: Tenthredinidae
- Genus: Fenella
- Species: F. nigrita

Binomial name
- Fenella nigrita (Westwood, 1840)

Synonyms
- Phyllotoma tormentillae

= Fenella nigrita =

Species of sawfly

Fenella nigrita is a Palearctic species of sawfly.
