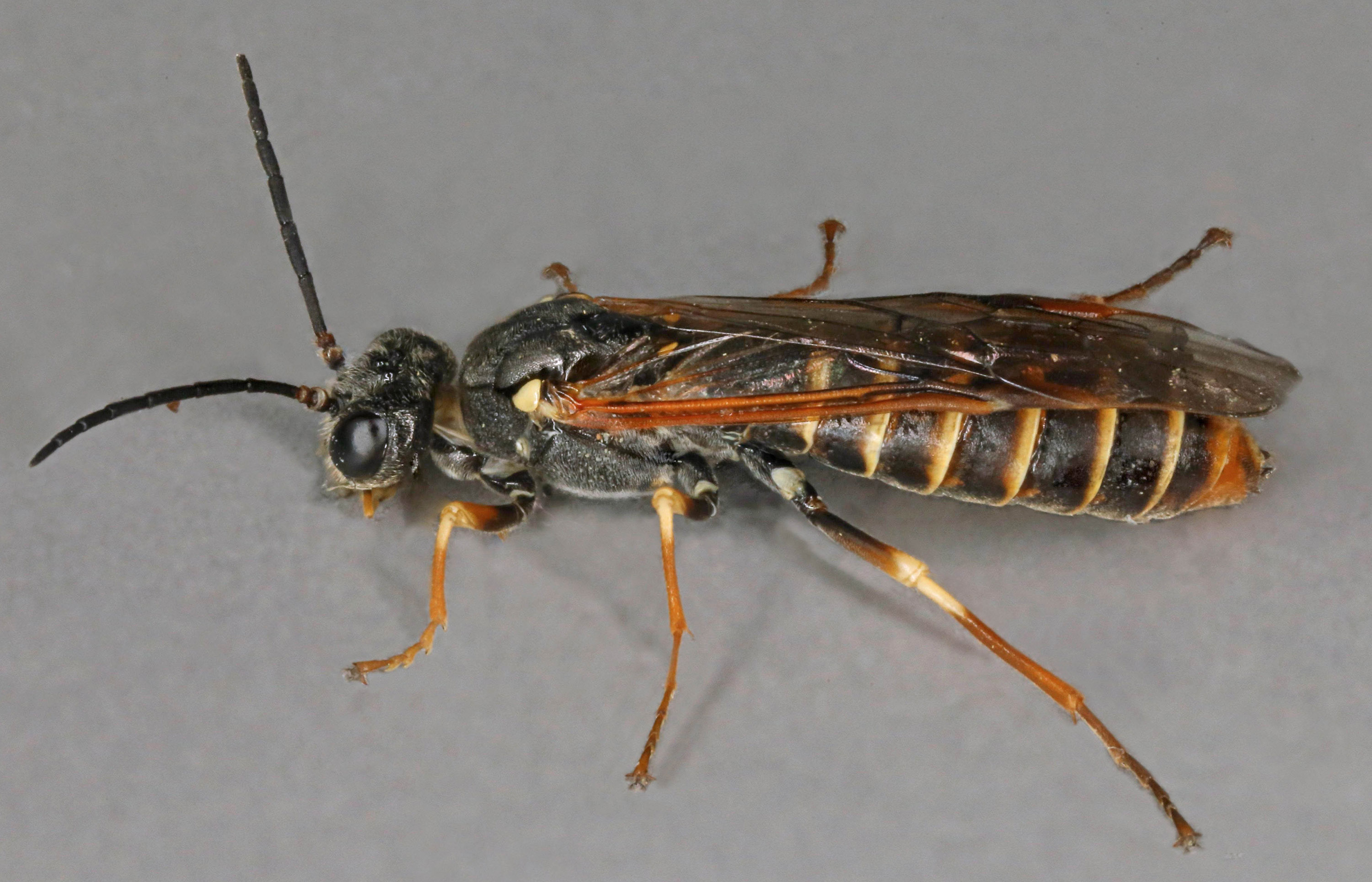
- Strongylogaster multifasciata Fenn's Moss, North Wales

Scientific classification
- Domain: Eukaryota
- Kingdom: Animalia
- Phylum: Arthropoda
- Class: Insecta
- Order: Hymenoptera
- Suborder: Symphyta
- Family: Tenthredinidae
- Genus: Strongylogaster
- Species: S. multifasciata

Binomial name
- Strongylogaster multifasciata (Geoffroy, 1785)

Synonyms
- Strongylogaster caucasica, Schaposchnikov, 1885; Tenthredo lineata, Christ, 1791

= Strongylogaster multifasciata =

Species of sawfly

Strongylogaster multifasciata is a Palearctic species of sawfly.
