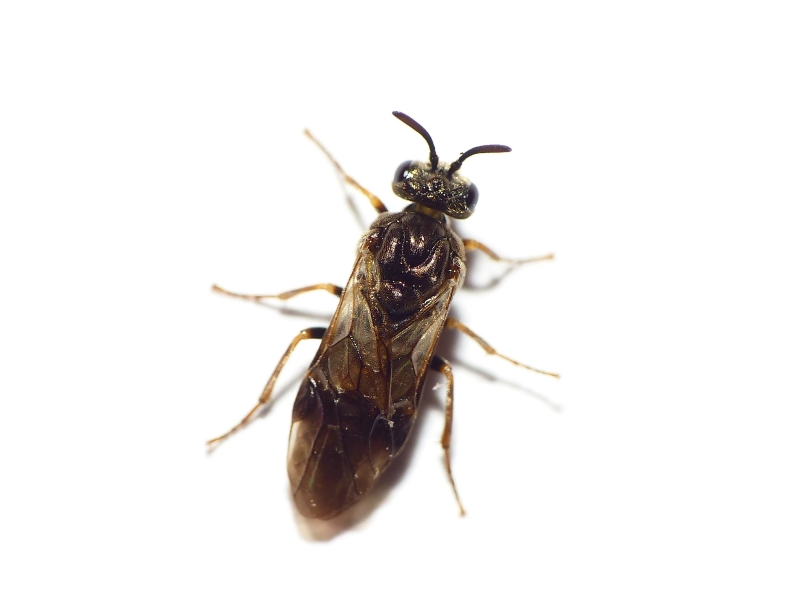

Scientific classification
- Domain: Eukaryota
- Kingdom: Animalia
- Phylum: Arthropoda
- Class: Insecta
- Order: Hymenoptera
- Suborder: Symphyta
- Family: Argidae
- Genus: Sterictiphora
- Species: S. geminata

Binomial name
- Sterictiphora geminata (Gmelin, 1790)

= Sterictiphora geminata =

Species of sawfly

Sterictiphora geminata is a Palearctic species of sawfly.
