= Monophadnoides rubi =

Scientific classification
- Kingdom: Animalia
- Phylum: Arthropoda
- Clade: Pancrustacea
- Class: Insecta
- Order: Hymenoptera
- Suborder: Symphyta
- Family: Tenthredinidae
- Genus: Monophadnoides
- Species: M. rubi

Binomial name
- Monophadnoides rubi (Harris, 1845)

Species of sawfly

Monophadnoides rubi, the raspberry sawfly, is a species of common sawfly in the family Tenthredinidae.
