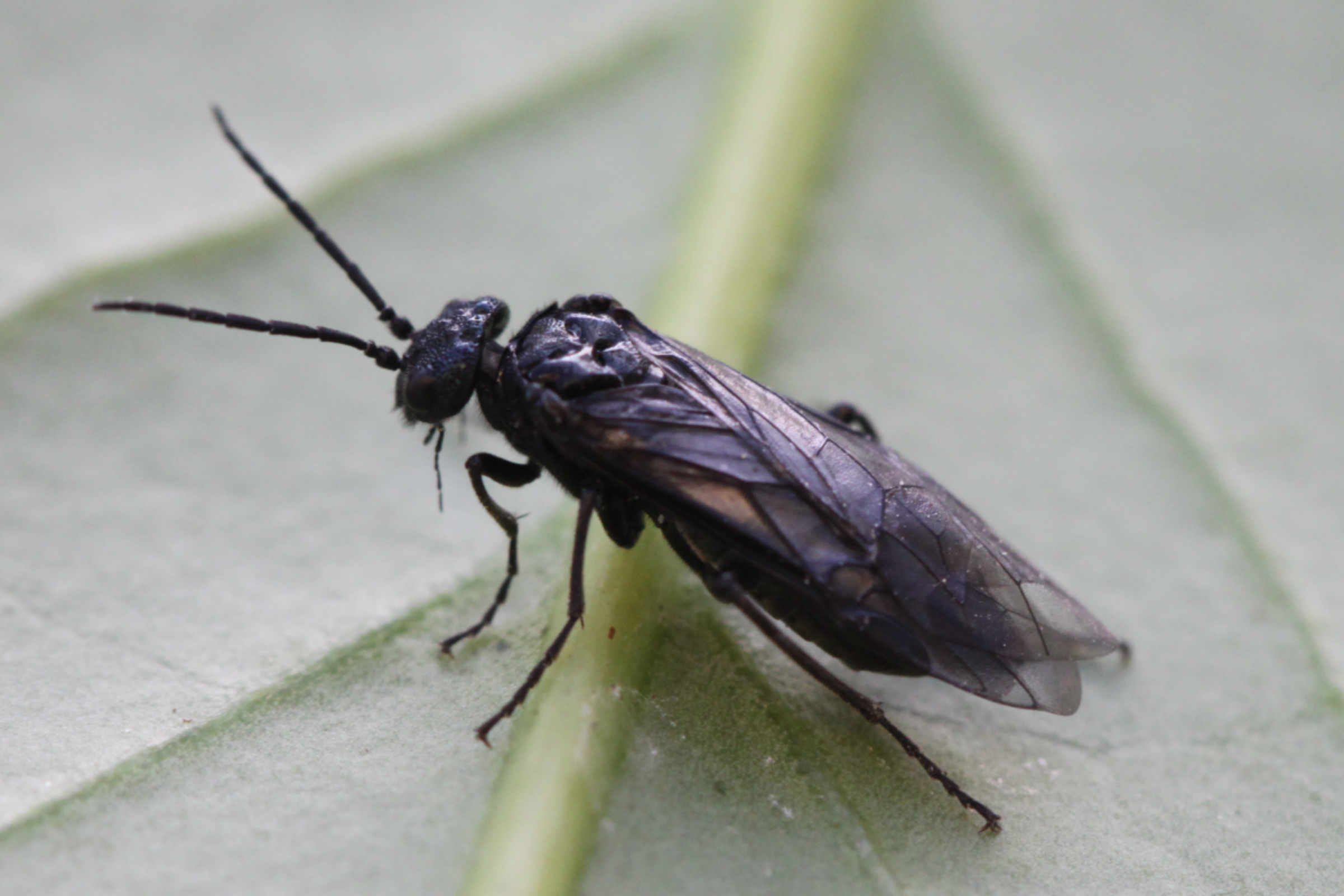
- In Schwetzinger Hardt, Mannheim, Germany

Scientific classification
- Domain: Eukaryota
- Kingdom: Animalia
- Phylum: Arthropoda
- Class: Insecta
- Order: Hymenoptera
- Suborder: Symphyta
- Family: Tenthredinidae
- Genus: Dolerus
- Species: D. nitens

Binomial name
- Dolerus nitens Zaddach, 1859

= Dolerus nitens =

Species of sawfly

Dolerus nitens is a Palearctic species of sawfly.
