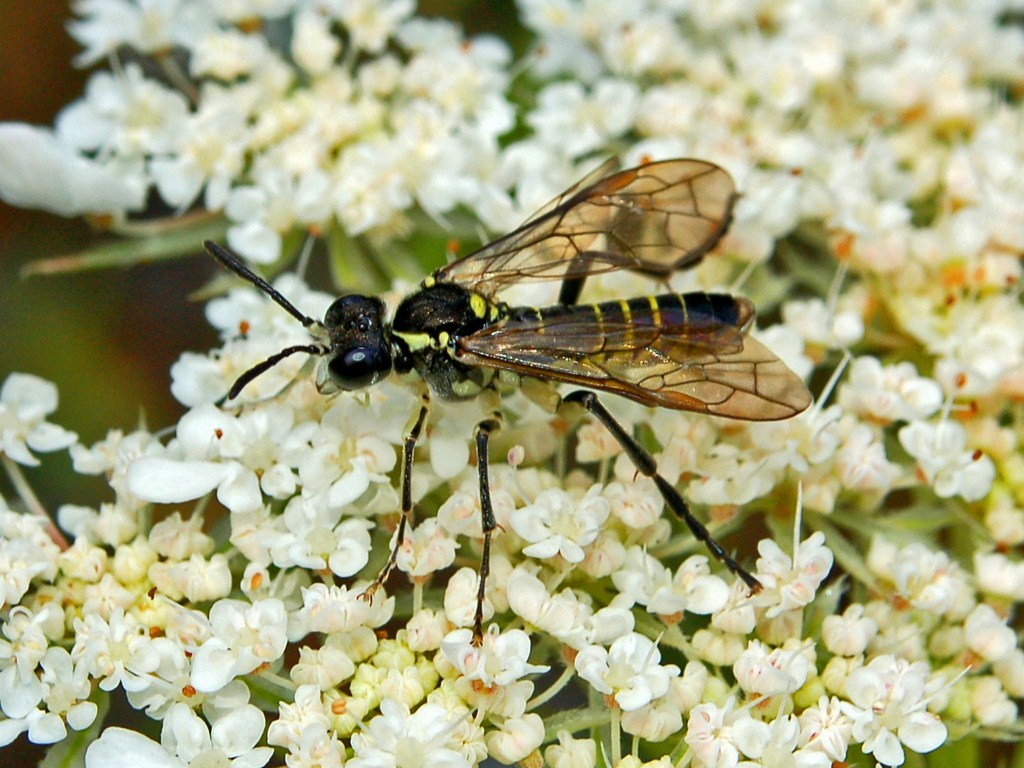
- Tenthredo notha

Scientific classification
- Kingdom: Animalia
- Phylum: Arthropoda
- Class: Insecta
- Order: Hymenoptera
- Suborder: Symphyta
- Family: Tenthredinidae
- Subfamily: Tenthredininae
- Tribe: Tenthredinini; Latreille, 1802

Type genus
- Tenthredo Linnaeus, 1758

Genera
- see text

= Tenthredinini =

Tribe of sawflies

Tenthredinini are a tribe of sawflies (Hymenoptera), including the family genus Tenthredo.

Genera include:

- Lagium Konow, 1904
- Rhogogaster Konow, 1884
- Tenthredo Linnaeus, 1758
- Tyloceridius Malaise, 1945

== Bibliography ==
- Benson, Robert B. (November 1959). "Tribes of the Tenthredininae and a new European genus (Hymenoptera: Tenthredinidae)". Proceedings of the Royal Entomological Society of London B. 28 (9–10): 121–127. doi:10.1111/j.1365-3113.1959.tb00147.x.
- Smith, David R (March 2003). "A Synopsis of the Sawflies (Hymenoptera: Symphyta) of America South of the United States: Tenthredinidae (Nematinae, Heterarthrinae, Tenthredininae)". Transactions of the American Entomological Society. 129 (1): 1–45. JSTOR 25078795.
- Krombein, Karl V; Hurd, Paul V; Smith, David R; Burks, B D, eds. (1979). Catalog of hymenoptera in America north of Mexico. Washington DC: Smithsonian Institution Press.
- Smith, David R. Symphyta, vol. i. pp. 1–137., in Krombein et al (1979)
- "Tenthredinini". BioLib.cz Biological Library. 2016.
