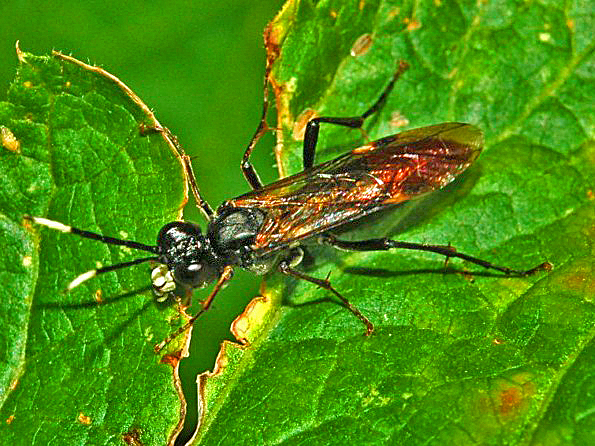

Scientific classification
- Kingdom: Animalia
- Phylum: Arthropoda
- Class: Insecta
- Order: Hymenoptera
- Suborder: Symphyta
- Family: Tenthredinidae
- Genus: Tenthredo
- Species: T. livida

Binomial name
- Tenthredo livida Linnaeus, 1758

Synonyms
- Tenthredella livida (Linnaeus, 1758)

= Tenthredo livida =

Species of sawfly

Tenthredo livida is a sawfly species belonging to the family Tenthredinidae (common sawflies), subfamily Tenthredininae.

== Distribution and habitat ==
This species is present in most of Europe. These sawflies mainly inhabit woodland rides, hedge rows and spruce forest edge.

== Description ==
The adults of Tenthredo livida are to 12–15 millimetres (0.47–0.59 in) long. The thorax and head are black, with a large white mouth area and white tips on antennae. Forewings have a white and brown stigma. This species is rather variable in colour. The abdomen is usually black in females, orange-reddish in males.

== Biology ==
Adults can be encountered from May through August feeding on small insects and on nectar and pollen of flowers, especially of Apiaceae species (Anthriscus sylvestris, Heracleum sphondylium).

The larvae are polyphagous and are nocturnal grazers, feeding on leaves of a variety of plants (mainly Rosaceae, Betulaceae and Salicaceae species, but also on bracken species).

== Gallery ==
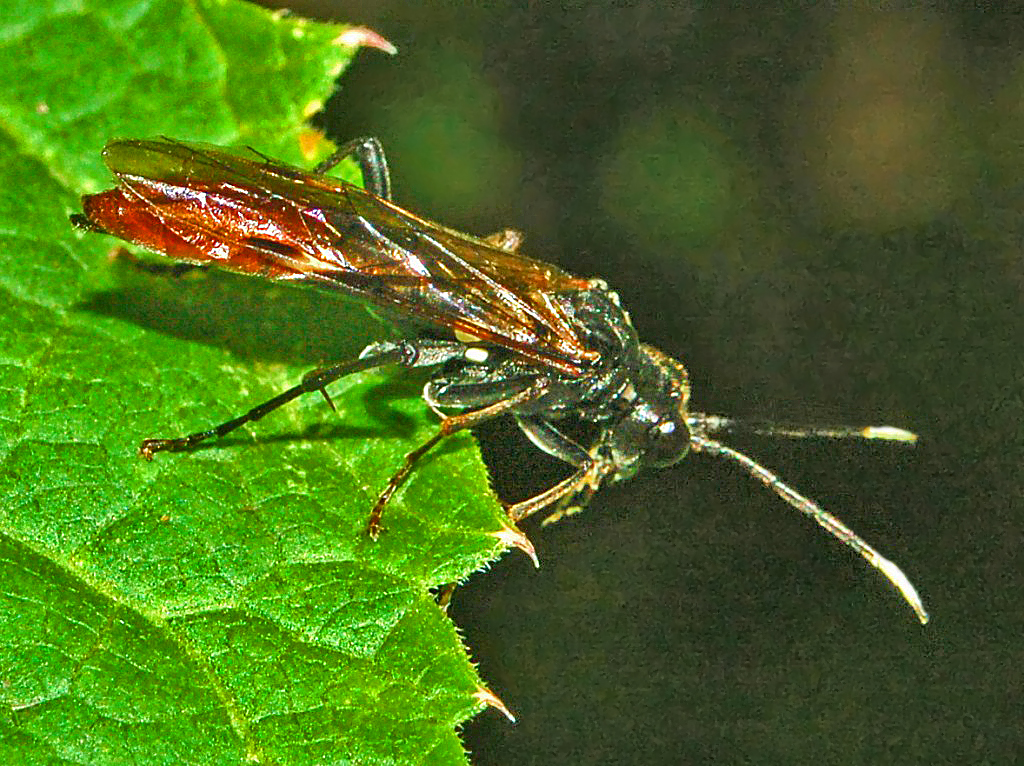
T. livida, female

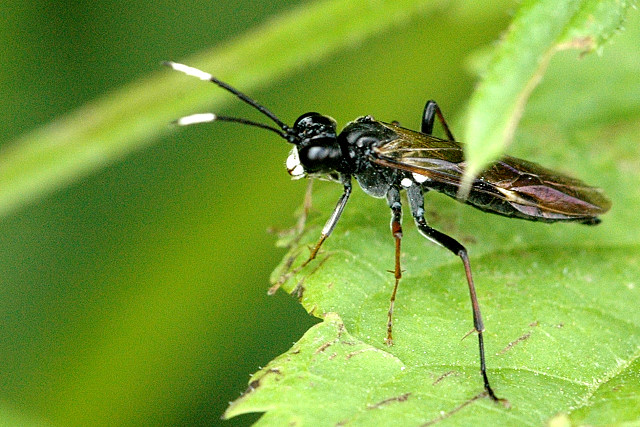
T. livida, female
