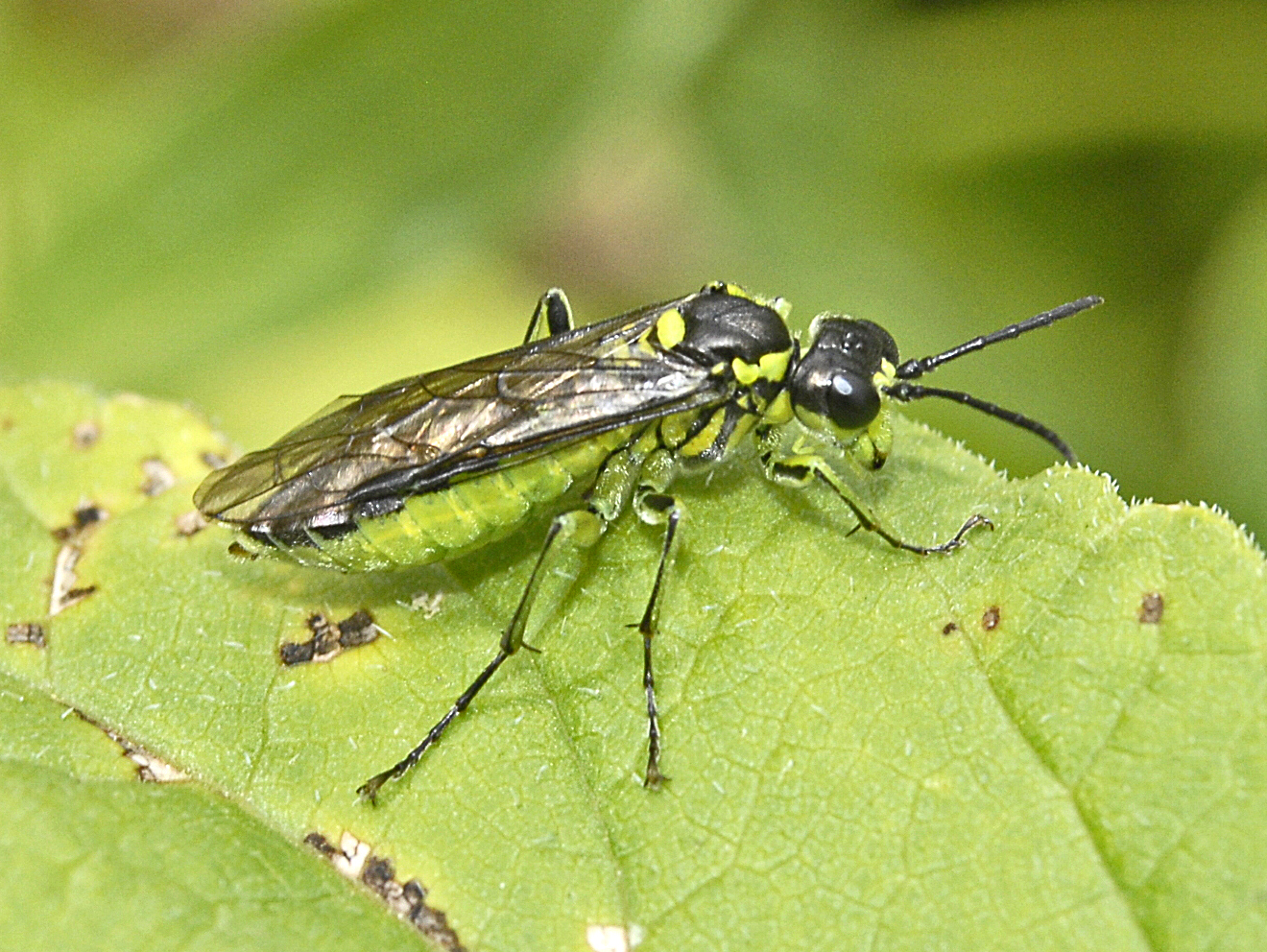

Scientific classification
- Kingdom: Animalia
- Phylum: Arthropoda
- Class: Insecta
- Order: Hymenoptera
- Suborder: Symphyta
- Family: Tenthredinidae
- Genus: Tenthredo
- Species: T. mesomela

Binomial name
- Tenthredo mesomela Linnaeus 1758

= Tenthredo mesomela =

Species of sawfly

Tenthredo mesomela is a sawfly species of the family Tenthredinidae (common sawflies), subfamily Tenthredininae.

== Description ==
Tenthredo mesomela can reach a length of about 10–15 millimetres (0.39–0.59 in). These sawflies have a yellow to apple green body with black head, thorax and upperside of the abdomen, while pronotum and scutellum are yellow. They are distinguished from the very similar species of the genus Rhogogaster by the position of the eyes and by their black pterostigma (Rhogogaster species have a green stigma).

The adults can be encountered from May through July feeding on small insects and on nectar and pollen of flowers (especially on Apiaceae species). The larvae feed at night on leaves of buttercup (Ranunculus species) and Persicaria species (Polygonaceae).

== Distribution and habitat ==
This species can be found in meadows, roadsides and forest edges in most of Europe.
