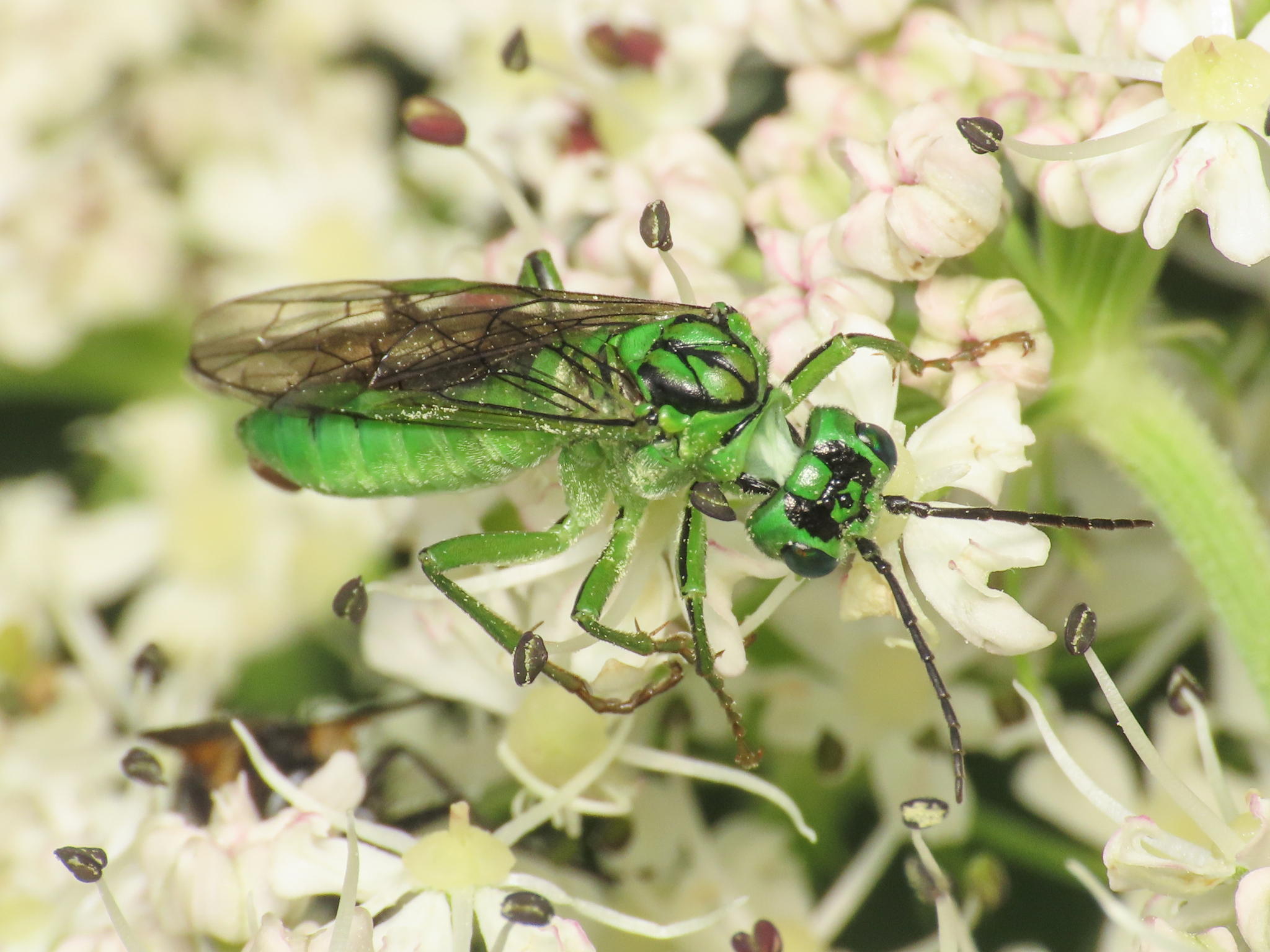

Scientific classification
- Domain: Eukaryota
- Kingdom: Animalia
- Phylum: Arthropoda
- Class: Insecta
- Order: Hymenoptera
- Suborder: Symphyta
- Family: Tenthredinidae
- Genus: Tenthredo
- Species: T. olivacea

Binomial name
- Tenthredo olivacea Klug, 1814

= Tenthredo olivacea =

Species of sawfly

Tenthredo olivacea is a sawfly species belonging to the family Tenthredinidae (common sawflies), subfamily Tenthredininae.

== Description ==
Tenthredo olivacea can reach a length of about 8–14 millimetres (0.31–0.55 in). This sawfly has a green body and a green head, with dark green eyes. Head, thorax and abdomen have black markings. The dorsal surface of femur, tibia and tarsus shows a black line. Wings are hyaline with black veins. Though similar to Rhogogaster viridis, it has a thinner body. Moreover R. viridis shows black rings on tarsi.

Adults can be found from May to August. They feed pollen, nectar, honeydew and small insect, while larvae feed on various herbaceous plants.

== Distribution ==
This species can be found in most of Europe.
