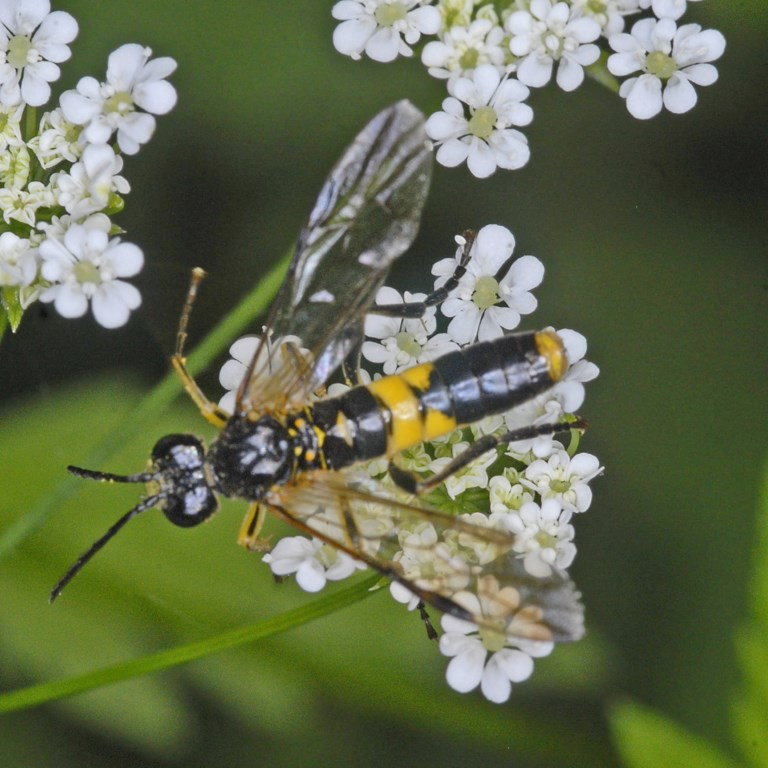
- Male of Tenthredo temula

Scientific classification
- Domain: Eukaryota
- Kingdom: Animalia
- Phylum: Arthropoda
- Class: Insecta
- Order: Hymenoptera
- Suborder: Symphyta
- Family: Tenthredinidae
- Genus: Tenthredo
- Species: T. temula

Binomial name
- Tenthredo temula Scopoli 1763

Synonyms
- Tenthredo celtica Benson

= Tenthredo temula =

Species of sawfly

Tenthredo temula is a sawfly species of the family Tenthredinidae (common sawflies), subfamily Tenthredininae.

== Distribution ==
This sawfly is a Euro-siberian species, widespread in most of European countries.

== Habitat ==
This species can be found in hedgerows and meadows.

== Description ==
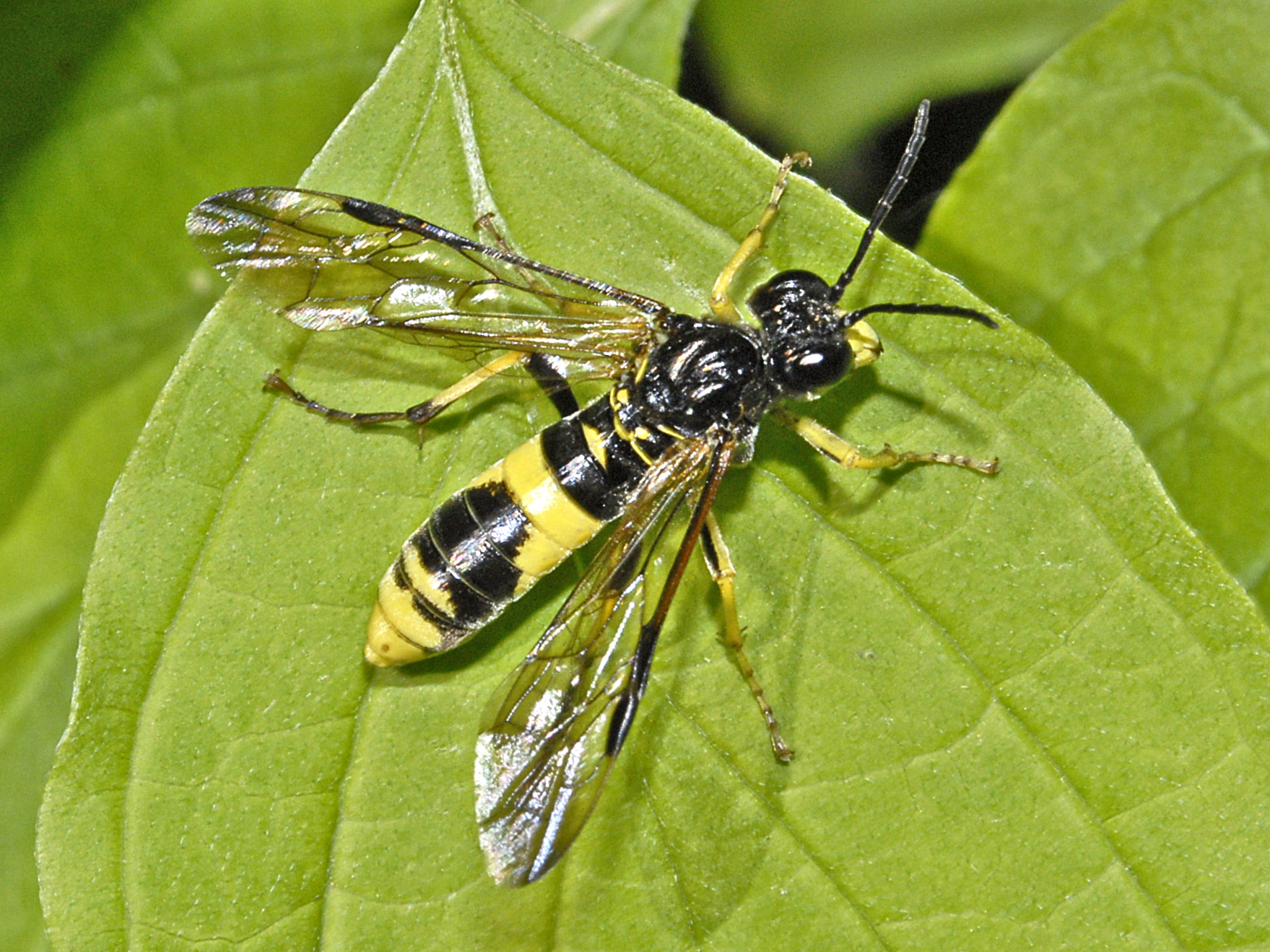
Female

The adults of Tenthredo temula are up to 10–13 millimetres (0.39–0.51 in) long. The thorax and head are brilliant black, clypeus, labrum and the base of mandibles are yellow, the abdomen is black with a transversal yellow band and a yellow tip. Femora and tibia are black in males, respectively black and yellow in females. The wings are brown and transparent, with brown veins and black stigma.

== Biology ==
They can be encountered from May through late summer feeding on small insects and on nectar and pollen of flowers from various plants (mainly family Apiaceae, as Anthriscus sylvestris, Hogweed (Heracleum sphondylium), but also on Rubus fruticosus and Crataegus monogyna. Larvae develop on plants of the genus Ligustrum.
