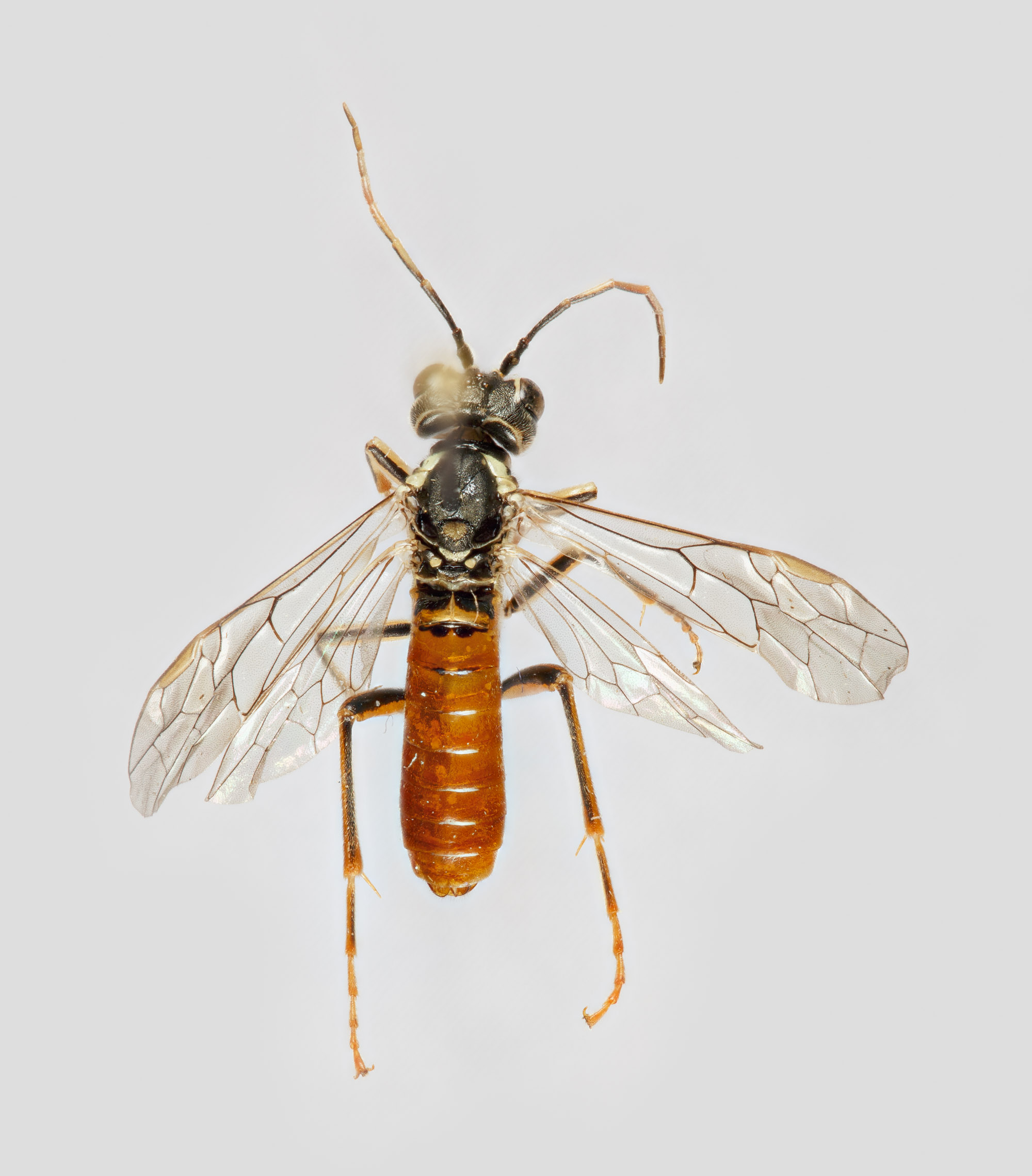
- Tenthredo ferruginea male Norway

Scientific classification
- Domain: Eukaryota
- Kingdom: Animalia
- Phylum: Arthropoda
- Class: Insecta
- Order: Hymenoptera
- Suborder: Symphyta
- Family: Tenthredinidae
- Genus: Tenthredo
- Species: T. ferruginea

Binomial name
- Tenthredo ferruginea Schrank, 1776

= Tenthredo ferruginea =

Species of sawfly

Tenthredo ferruginea is a Palearctic species of sawfly.
