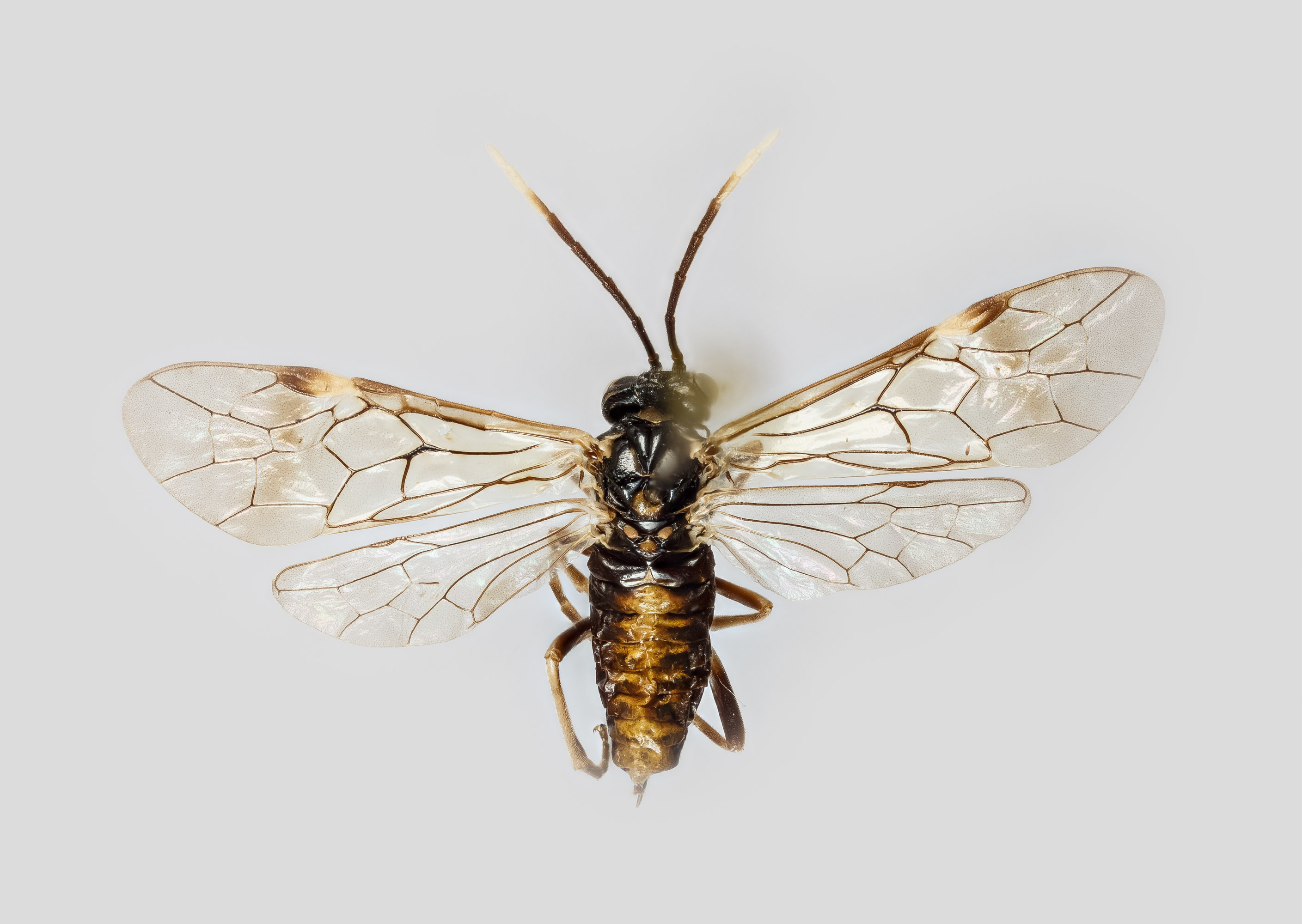
- Perineura rubi Norway

Scientific classification
- Domain: Eukaryota
- Kingdom: Animalia
- Phylum: Arthropoda
- Class: Insecta
- Order: Hymenoptera
- Suborder: Symphyta
- Family: Tenthredinidae
- Genus: Perineura
- Species: P. rubi

Binomial name
- Perineura rubi (Panzer, 1801)

= Perineura rubi =

Species of sawfly

Perineura rubi is a Palearctic species of sawfly.
