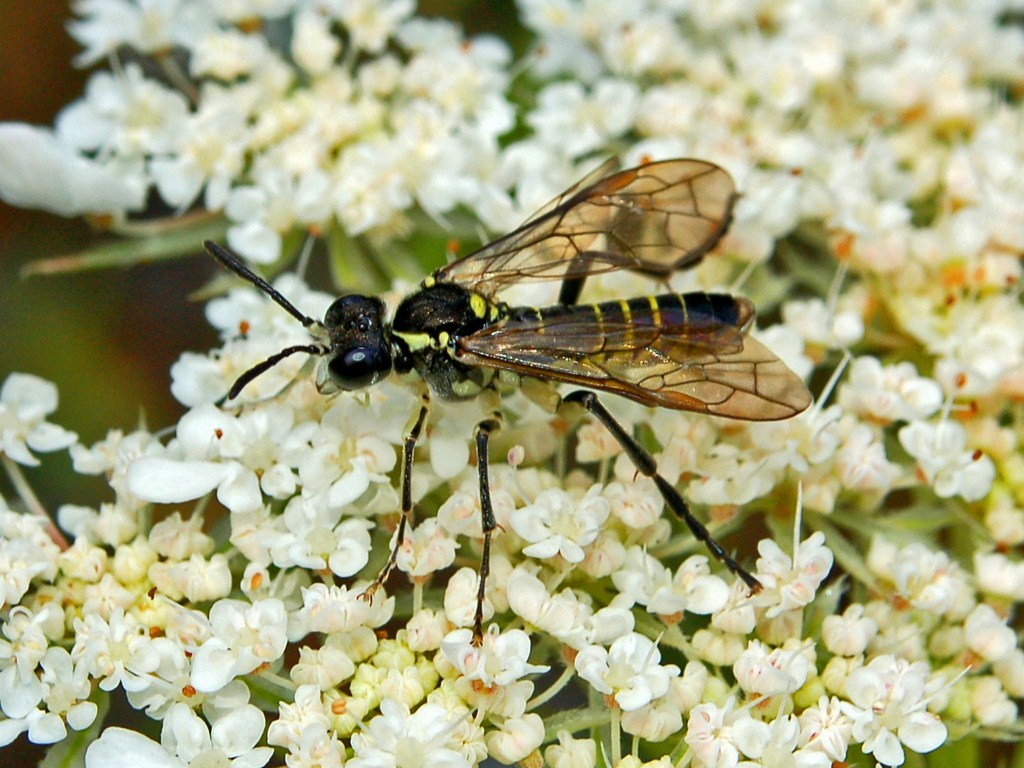
- Tenthredo arcuata

Scientific classification
- Kingdom: Animalia
- Phylum: Arthropoda
- Clade: Pancrustacea
- Class: Insecta
- Order: Hymenoptera
- Suborder: Symphyta
- Family: Tenthredinidae
- Subfamily: Tenthredininae
- Tribe: Tenthredinini
- Genus: Tenthredo; Linnaeus, 1758

Species
- See text

= Tenthredo =

Genus of sawflies

Tenthredo (from the Greek τενθρηδών tenthrēdōn "earth nesting wasp") is a genus of sawflies with more than 700 species of the family Tenthredinidae, subfamily Tenthredininae. It is of Holarctic distribution.

== Description ==
Species of this genus are easily recognisable by their wasplike appearance although lacking the thin 'waist' of a true wasp. They have long antennæ. The fore wings of these sawflies have a lance-shaped cell with a straight cross-nervure. Larvae feed on a very wide variety of plants, each species is often restricted to one host; adults prey on flies and other insects in flowers.

== List of species ==
- T. abdominalis (Matsumura, 1912)
- T. adusta Motschulsky, 1866
- T. albiventris (Mocsáry, 1880)
- T. alboannulata (Takeuchi, 1933)
- T. algoviensis Enslin, 1912
- T. amasiensis (Kriechbaumer, 1869)
- T. amoena Gravenhorst, 1807
- T. amurica Dalla Torre, 1894
- T. arctica (C. G. Thomson, 1870)
- T. arcuata Forster, 1771
- T. arida (Lacourt, 1995)
- T. asiatica Enslin, 1910
- T. asperrima Lacourt, 1980
- T. atra Linnaeus, 1758
- T. babai Takeuchi, 1936
- T. baetica Spinola, 1843
- T. balteata Klug, 1814
- T. basizonata Malaise, 1938
- T. bifasciata O. F. Müller, 1766
- T. bipunctula Klug, 1814
- T. bipunctulata Enslin, 1920
- T. bizonula (Enslin, 1910)
- T. borea Enslin, 1919
- T. brachycera (Mocsary, 1909)
- T. brevicornis (Konow, 1886)
- T. campestris Linnaeus, 1758
- T. canariensis (Schedl, 1979)
- T. caspia (Ed. André, 1881)
- T. caucasica Eversmann, 1847
- T. clathrata Enslin, 1912
- T. colon Klug, 1814
- T. confinis (Konow, 1886)
- T. confusa Serville, 1823
- T. contigua (Konow, 1894)
- T. contusa Enslin, 1920
- T. convergenata (Takeuchi, 1955)
- T. costata Klug, 1817
- T. crassa Scopoli, 1763
- T. cunyi Konow, 1886
- T. cylindrica (Rohwer, 1911)
- T. dahlii Klug, 1817
- T. decens Zhelochovtsev, 1939
- T. devia (Konow, 1900)
- T. diana Benson, 1968
- T. distinguenda Stein, 1885
- T. eburata Konow, 1900
- T. eburneifrons W. F. Kirby, 1882
- T. eduardi (Forsius, 1919)
- T. emphytiformis Malaise, 1931
- T. enslini (Schirmer, 1913)
- T. excellens (Konow, 1886)
- T. fagi Panzer, 1798
- T. ferruginea Schrank, 1776
- T. finschi Kirby, 1882
- T. flaveola Gmelin, 1790
- T. flavipectus (Matsumura, 1912)
- T. flavipennis Brullé, 1832
- T. flavomandibulata (Matsumura, 1912)
- T. frauenfeldii Giraud, 1857
- T. fukaii (Rohwer, 1910)
- T. fuscoterminata Marlatt, 1898
- T. gifui Marlatt, 1898
- T. giraudi (Taeger, 1991)
- T. grandis (Norton, 1860)
- T. hilaris F. Smith, 1874
- T. hokkaidonis (Malaise, 1931)
- T. ignobilis Klug, 1814
- T. jacutensis (Konow, 1897)
- T. jakutensis (Konow, 1897)
- T. japonica (Mocsary, 1909)
- T. jelochovcevi Vassilev, 1971
- T. jonoensis Matsumura, 1912
- T. jozana (Matsumura, 1912)
- T. katsumii Togashi, 1974
- T. kiobii Togashi, 1973
- T. korabica Taeger, 1985
- T. kurilensis (Takeuchi, 1931)
- T. lacourti Taeger, 1991
- T. largiflava (Enslin, 1910)
- T. limbalis Spinola, 1843
- T. livida Linnaeus, 1758
- T. llorentei (Lacourt, 1995)
- T. longipennis (Matsumura, 1912)
- T. luteipennis Eversmann, 1847
- T. luteocincta Eversmann, 1847
- T. maculata Geoffroy, 1762
- T. maculipes Serville, 1823
- T. mandibularis Fabricius, 1804
- T. marginella Fabricius, 1793
- T. matsumurai (Takeuchi, 1933)
- T. merceti (Konow, 1905)
- T. meridiana Serville, 1823
- T. mesomela Linnaeus, 1758
- T. microps Konow, 1903
- T. mioceras Enslin, 1912
- T. mitsuhashii (Matsumura, 1920)
- T. moniliata Klug, 1814
- T. monozonus (Kriechbaumer, 1869)
- T. mortivaga Marlatt, 1898
- T. nagaii (Togashi, 1963)
- T. naraensis Kumamoto, 1987
- T. neobesa Zombori, 1980
- T. nevadensis Lacourt, 1980
- T. nigripleuris (Enslin, 1910)
- T. nigropicta (F. Smith, 1874)
- T. nitidiceps (Takeuchi, 1955)
- T. notha Klug, 1814
- T. notomelas Enslin, 1920
- T. nympha Pesarini, 1999
- T. obsoleta Klug, 1814
- T. occupata Kumamoto, 1987
- T. okamotoi Inomata, 1967
- T. olivacea Klug, 1814
- T. omissa Forster, 1844
- T. ornata André, 1881
- T. ornatularia Shinohara, 1994
- T. picticornis (Mocsary, 1909)
- T. platycera (Mocsary, 1909)
- T. procera Klug, 1814
- T. propinqua Klug, 1817
- T. providens F. Smith, 1874
- T. pyrenaea Taeger & Schmidt, 1992
- T. rubricoxis (Enslin, 1912)
- T. rubrocaudata (Takeuchi, 1936)
- T. sabariensis (Mocsáry, 1880)
- T. sakaguchii (Takeuchi, 1933)
- T. sapporensis (Matsumura, 1912)
- T. schaefferi Klug, 1814
- T. scrophulariae Linnaeus, 1758
- T. sebastiani (Lacourt, 1988)
- T. segmentaria Fabricius, 1798
- T. sekidoensis Togashi, 1976
- T. semirufa (Ed. André, 1881)
- T. shinoharai Togashi, 1974
- T. shishikuensis (Togashi, 1963)
- T. silensis A. Costa, 1859
- T. simplex Dalla Torre, 1882
- T. smithiana Togashi, 1977
- T. smithii Kirby, 1882
- T. sobrina Eversmann, 1847
- T. solitaria Scopoli, 1763
- T. subolivacea (Takeuchi, 1955)
- T. sulphuripes (Kriechbaumer, 1869)
- T. takeuchii (Togashi, 1963)
- T. tamanukii (Takeuchi, 1936)
- T. tanakai Togashi, 1973
- T. temula Scopoli, 1763
- T. tenuivaginata (Takeuchi, 1955)
- T. thompsoni (Curtis, 1839)
- T. togashii Kumamoto & Shinohara, 1997
- T. trabeata Klug, 1814
- T. tsunekii Togashi, 1966
- T. umbrica Benson, 1959
- T. ussuriensis (Mocsary, 1909)
- T. velox Fabricius, 1798
- T. versuta Mocsary, 1909
- T. vespa Retzius, 1783
- T. vespiformis Schrank, 1781
- T. vespula Kumamoto & Shinohara, 1997
- T. vilarrubiai (Conde, 1935)
- T. violettae Lacourt, 1973
- T. viridatrix
- T. xanthopus Spinola, 1843
- T. xanthotarsis Cameron, 1876
- T. yezoensis Kumamoto, 1987
- T. zomborii Togashi, 1977
- T. zona Klug, 1814
- T. zonula Klug, 1814
