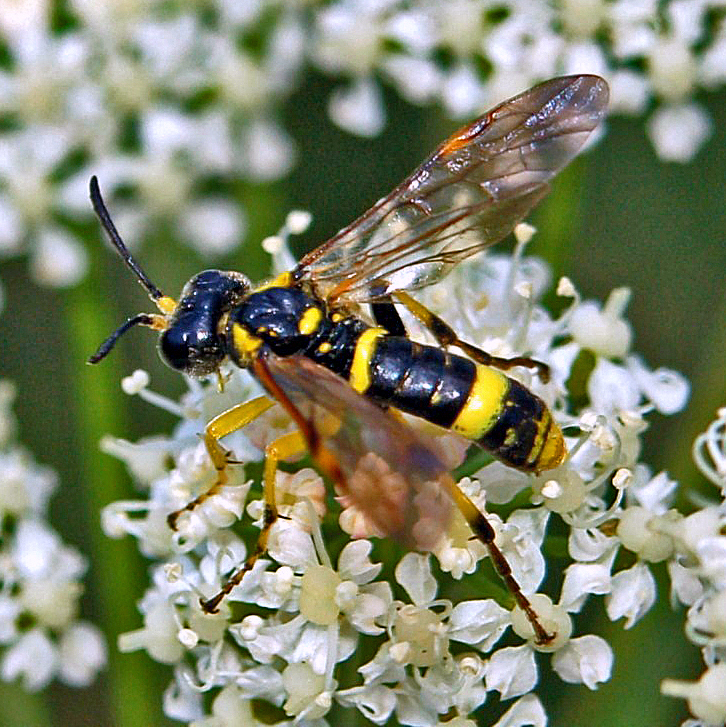
- Tenthredo amoena, dorsal view

Scientific classification
- Kingdom: Animalia
- Phylum: Arthropoda
- Clade: Pancrustacea
- Class: Insecta
- Order: Hymenoptera
- Suborder: Symphyta
- Family: Tenthredinidae
- Genus: Tenthredo
- Species: T. amoena

Binomial name
- Tenthredo amoena Gravenhorst, 1807

= Tenthredo amoena =

Species of sawfly

Tenthredo amoena is a sawfly species belonging to the family Tenthredinidae (common sawflies).

== Distribution and habitat ==
This species can be found in most of Europe.

== Description ==
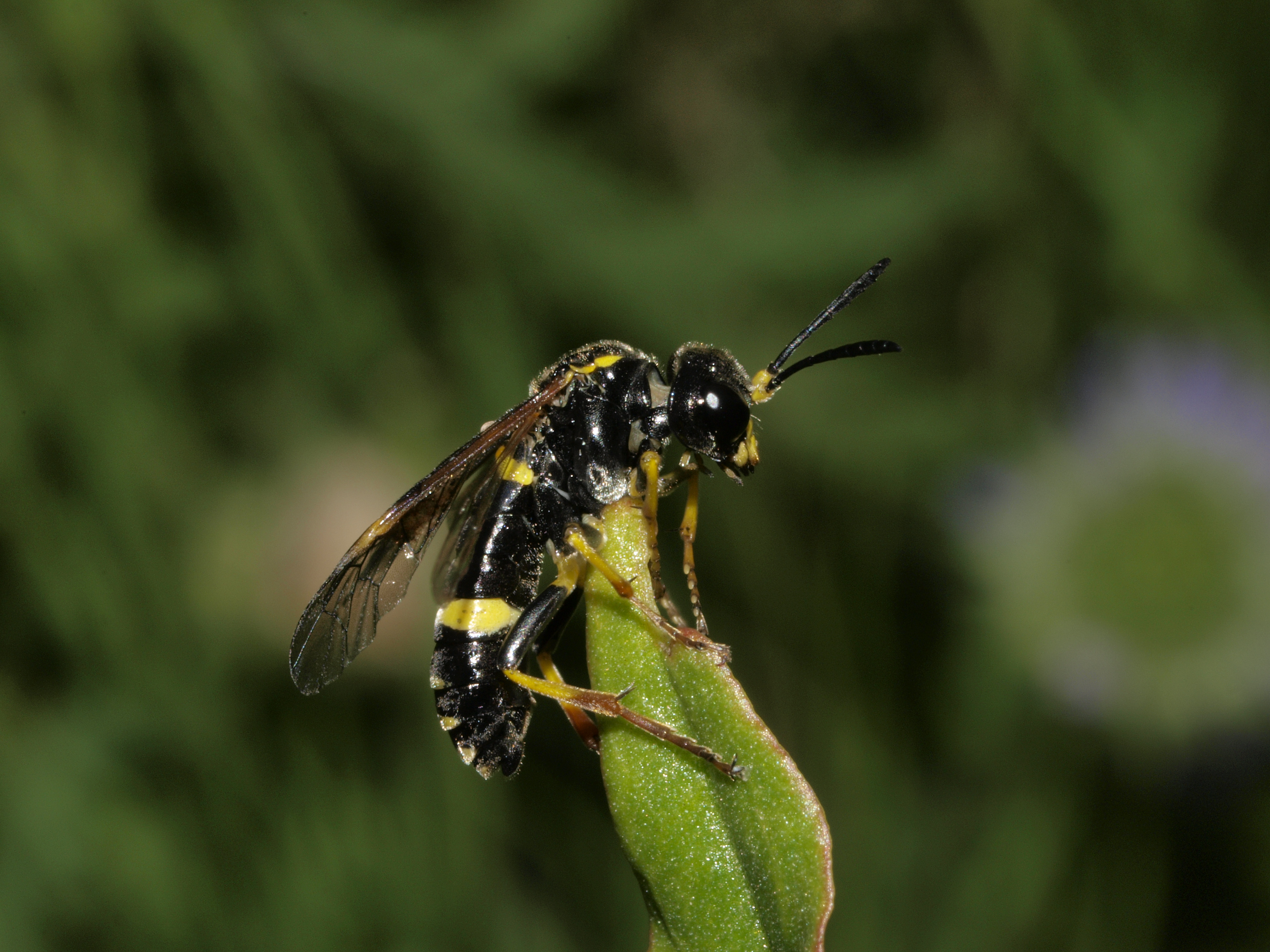
Female, side view

Tenthredo amoena can reach a length of about 9–11 millimetres (0.35–0.43 in). These sawflies have a black body with yellowish markings and short antennae, that are about one and a half times the width of the head. The first antennal element is pure yellow. In the males the first, fifth and 7-8 tergites of the abdomen are yellow. The scutellum is often spotted with yellow. Wings show a pale brown color with a long brown pterostigma. In the females the apex of tibiae and tarsi are yellow with black markings. The thighs are pure black.

This species is rather similar to Tenthredo distinguenda.

== Biology ==
The adults can be encountered from June through July feeding on nectar and pollen of flowers (especially on Apiaceae species). The larvae feed on leaves of Hypericum species, mainly of Hypericum perforatum and Hypericum maculatum. These larvae are yellow and green with black spots and a yellow head.

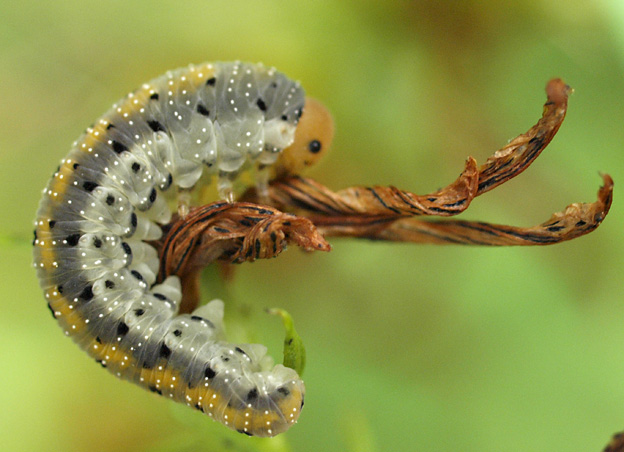
Larva on Hypericum perforatum

== Bibliography ==
- Andreas Taeger (1991): Vierter Beitrag zur Systematik der Blattwespengattung Tenthredo Linnaeus. Die Untergattung Zonuledo Zhelochovtsev, 1988. Entomofauna Zeitschrift für Entomologie Band 12, Heft 23: 373–400.
- Andreas Taeger, Ewald Altenhofer, Stephan M. Blank, Ewald Jansen, Manfred Kraus, Hubert Pschorn-Walcher, Carsten Ritzau: Kommentare zur Biologie, Verbreitung und Gefährdung der Pflanzenwespen Deutschlands (Hymenoptera, Symphyta). In: Taeger, A.; Blank, S. M. 1998 (Hrsg.): Pflanzenwespen Deutschlands (Hymenoptera, Symphyta). Kommentierte Bestandsaufnahme. - Goecke & Evers, Keltern, 364 + 3 S., 8 Farbtafeln. p. 121
- G. Llorente S.F. Gayubo (1991): Estudio sobre la sinfitofauna del oeste Espanõl. III. Tenthredinidae: Tenthredininae y Nematinae (Hymenoptera: Symphyta). Anales de Biología Vol. 17: 43–52.
