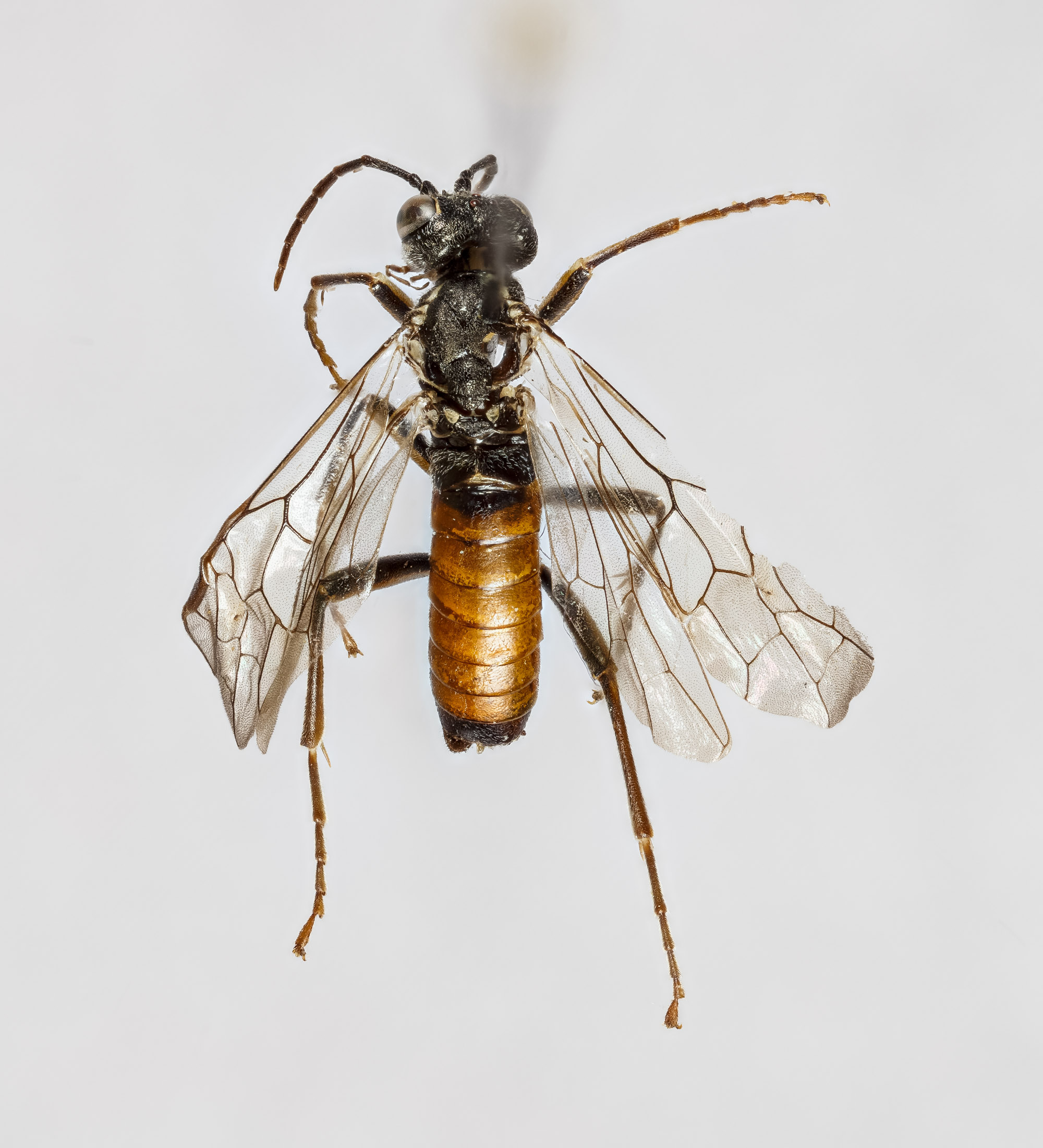
- Tenthredo balteata male Norway

Scientific classification
- Domain: Eukaryota
- Kingdom: Animalia
- Phylum: Arthropoda
- Class: Insecta
- Order: Hymenoptera
- Suborder: Symphyta
- Family: Tenthredinidae
- Genus: Tenthredo
- Species: T. balteata

Binomial name
- Tenthredo balteata Klug, 1817

= Tenthredo balteata =

Species of sawfly

Tenthredo balteata is a Palearctic species of sawfly.
