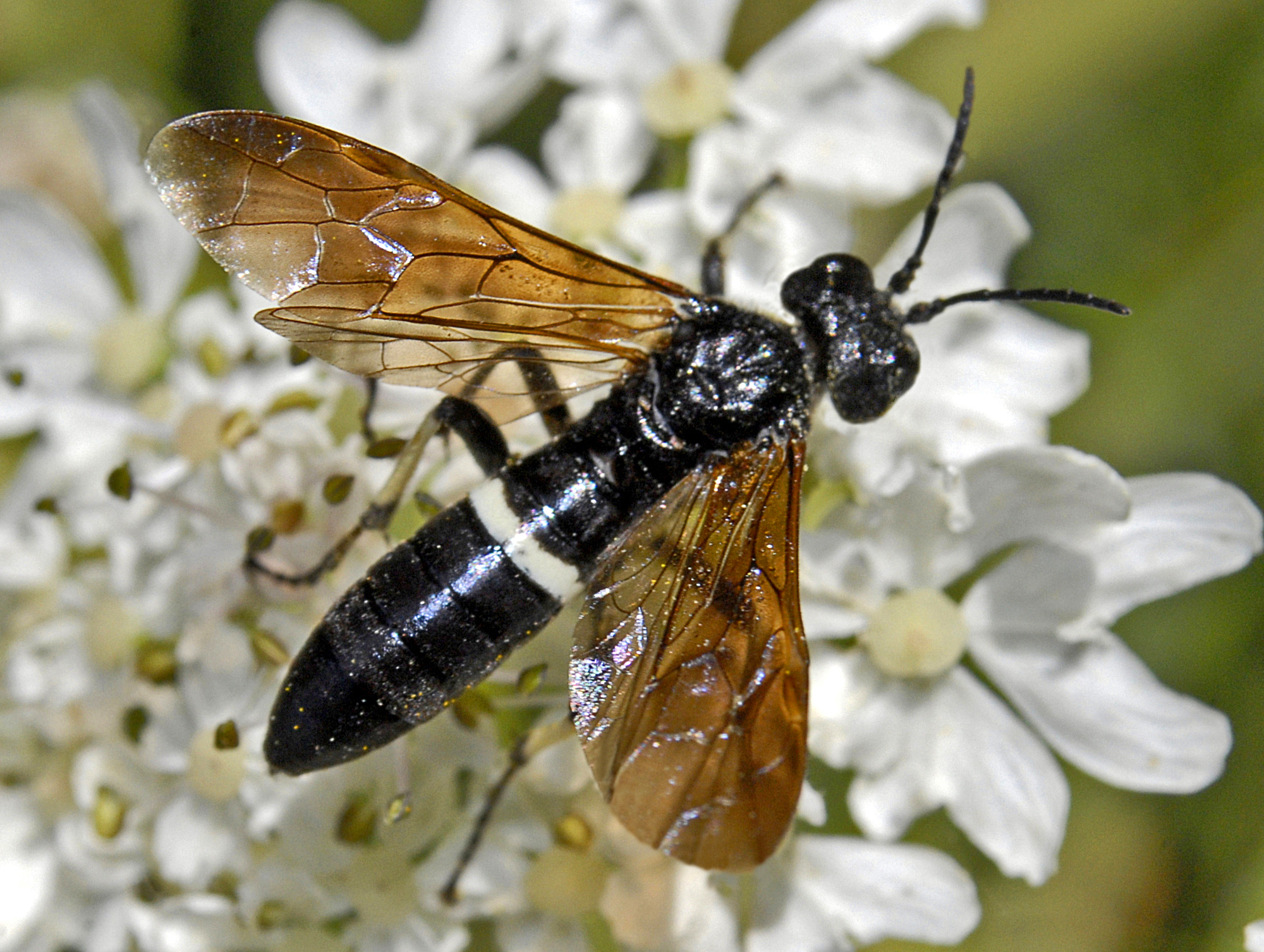
- Tenthredo (Cephaledo) bifasciata

Scientific classification
- Kingdom: Animalia
- Phylum: Arthropoda
- Class: Insecta
- Order: Hymenoptera
- Suborder: Symphyta
- Family: Tenthredinidae
- Genus: Tenthredo
- Species: T. bifasciata

Binomial name
- Tenthredo bifasciata O. F. Muller, 1766

= Tenthredo bifasciata =

Species of sawfly

Tenthredo bifasciata is a species of sawflies of the family Tenthredinidae.

== Subspecies ==
- Tenthredo (Cephaledo) bifasciata bifasciata O. F. Muller, 1766 – head and thorax are blackish brown, front and middle tibias are entirely black
- Tenthredo (Cephaledo) bifasciata rossii (Panzer, 1804) - clear or silvery pubescence, white middle and lower tibias
- Tenthredo (Cephaledo) bifasciata violacea (Ed. Andre, 1881) - pronotum widely yellow (Eastern Europe)

== Distribution ==
This species can be found in Europe.

== Habitat ==
Tenthredo bifasciata mainly lives in meadows, especially close to forestry areas.

== Description ==
Tenthredo bifasciata can reach a length of 11–13 millimetres (0.43–0.51 in). The thorax and head are blackish brown. Abdomen shows one or two transversal white or pale yellow bands, sometimes interrupted. Wings are yellowinsh-brown and transparent.

== Biology ==
These sawflies can be encountered from July to August. Adults mainly feed on nectar and pollen of Apiaceae, especially on Heracleum sphondylium. Larvae feed on Sonchus arvensis.
