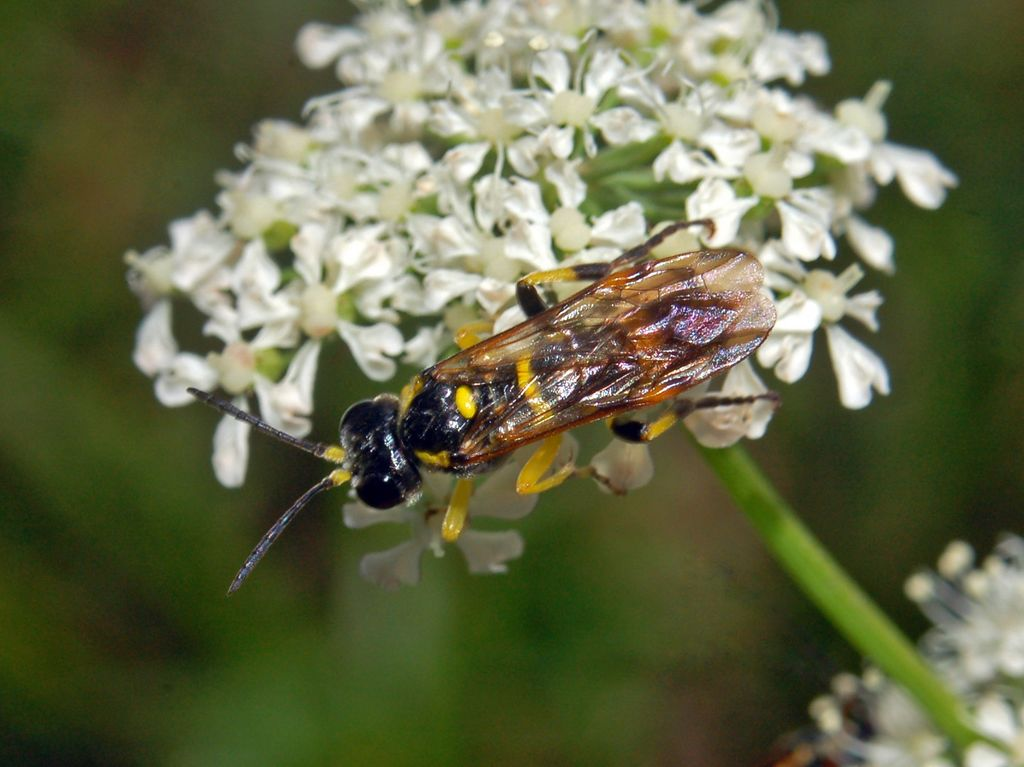

Scientific classification
- Domain: Eukaryota
- Kingdom: Animalia
- Phylum: Arthropoda
- Class: Insecta
- Order: Hymenoptera
- Suborder: Symphyta
- Family: Tenthredinidae
- Genus: Tenthredo
- Species: T. zonula

Binomial name
- Tenthredo zonula Klug, 1814

Synonyms
- Tenthredo (Zonuledo) zonula Klug, 1814

= Tenthredo zonula =

Species of sawfly

Tenthredo zonula, a common sawfly, is a species belonging to the family Tenthredinidae subfamily Tenthrediniinae. It is mainly present in France, Germany, Italy, Austria, Switzerland, Poland, Romania, Russia and Greece.

The adults grow up to 8–10 millimetres (0.31–0.39 in) long. They can be encountered from June through August feeding on flowers (especially on Euphorbia and Apiaceae species). The larvae feed on Hypericum species.

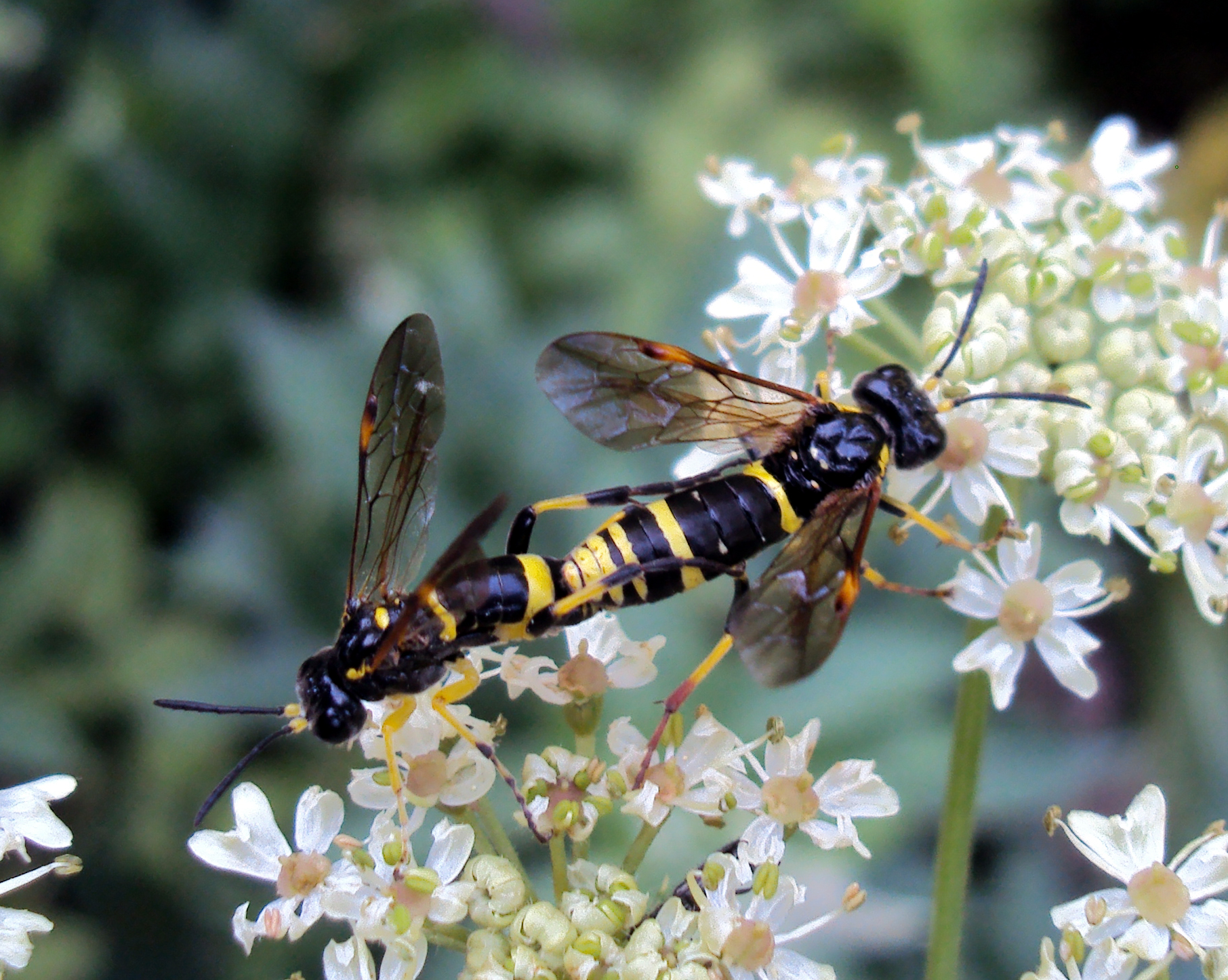
Tenthredo zonula, meeting ♂♀
