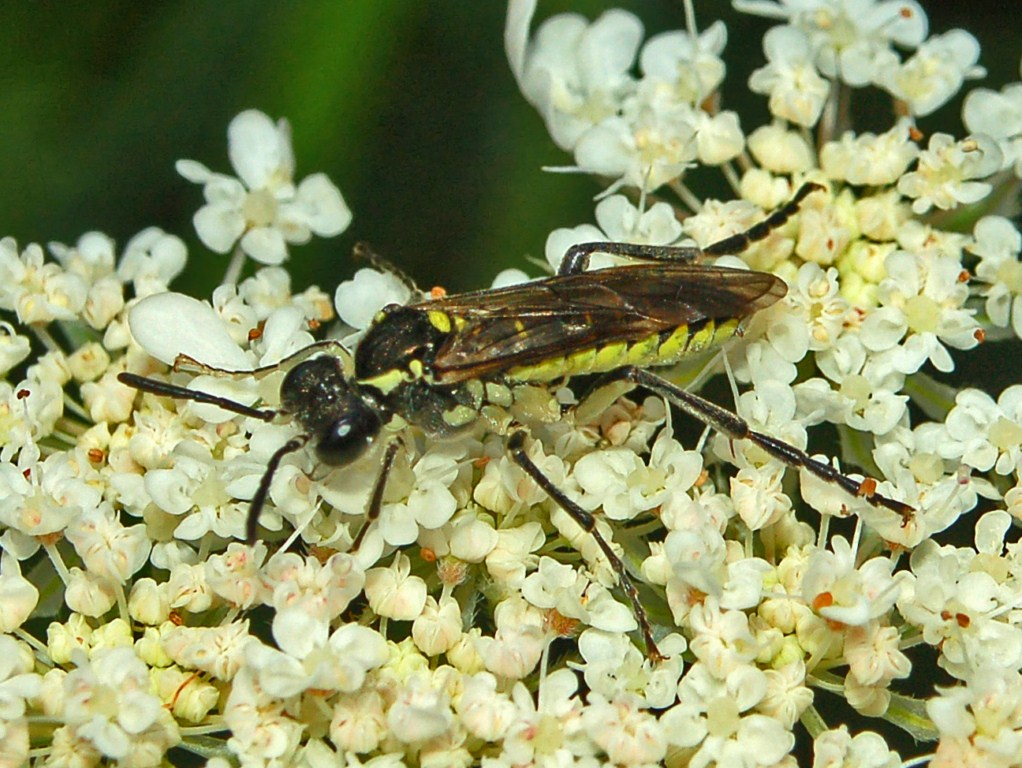

Scientific classification
- Domain: Eukaryota
- Kingdom: Animalia
- Phylum: Arthropoda
- Class: Insecta
- Order: Hymenoptera
- Suborder: Symphyta
- Family: Tenthredinidae
- Genus: Tenthredo
- Species: T. notha

Binomial name
- Tenthredo notha Klug, 1814

Synonyms
- Allantus perkinsi Morice, 1919; Tenthredo schaefferi f. perkinsi (Morice, 1919)

= Tenthredo notha =

Species of sawfly

Tenthredo notha, a common sawfly, is a species belonging to the family Tenthredinidae subfamily Tenthrediniinae.

== Distribution ==
This species is mainly present in British Isles, Bulgaria, Croatia, Czech Republic, France, Germany, Italy, Austria, Belgium, Slovakia, Sweden, Switzerland, Poland, Russia, Ukraine and Greece.

== Description ==
The adults grow up to 8–11 millimetres (0.31–0.43 in) long. These quite large sawflies have a lemon-yellow abdomen with black markings. This species is very similar to Tenthredo arcuata and Tenthredo brevicornis.

== Biology ==
They can be encountered from June through September feeding on small insects and on nectar and pollen of flowers (especially on Apiaceae species).

The larvae mainly feed on clover (Trifolium repens), they overwinter as eonymph, pupating and emerging the following Spring.
