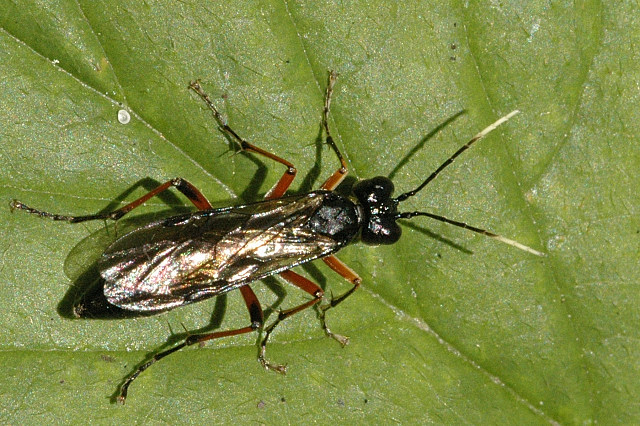
- Tenthredo colon, imago
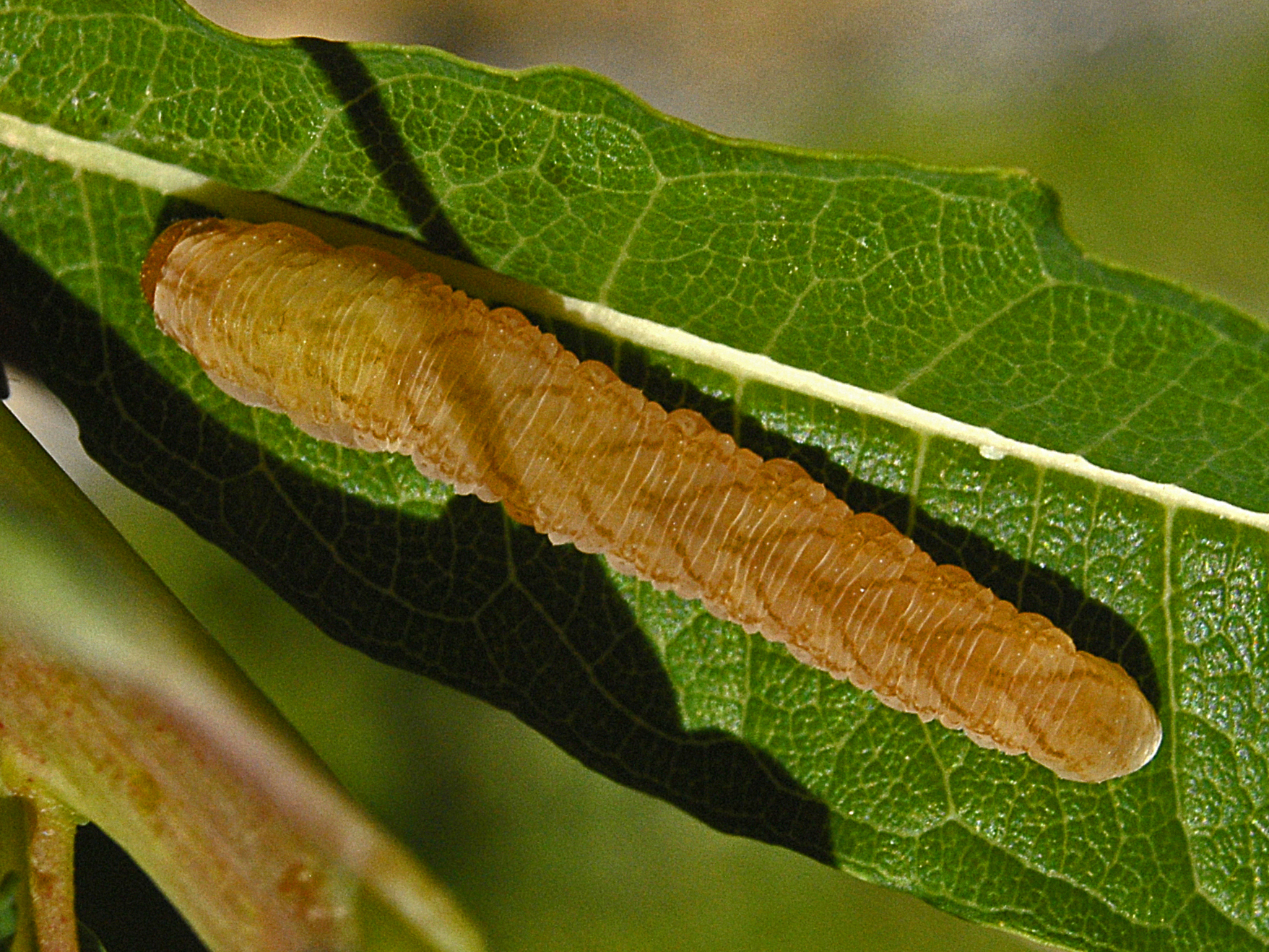
- Tenthredo colon, larva

Scientific classification
- Kingdom: Animalia
- Phylum: Arthropoda
- Class: Insecta
- Order: Hymenoptera
- Suborder: Symphyta
- Family: Tenthredinidae
- Genus: Tenthredo
- Species: T. colon

Binomial name
- Tenthredo colon Klug, 1814

Synonyms
- Tenthredella colon (Klug, 1817)

= Tenthredo colon =

Species of sawfly

Tenthredo colon is a sawfly species belonging to the family Tenthredinidae (common sawflies).

== Description ==
Tenthredo colon can reach a length of about 10–13 millimetres (0.39–0.51 in). These sawflies have black head and thorax. Abdomen is black with a reddish area towards the tip. Legs are reddish. Antennae are black, with white tips. The larvae are pale brown with a characteristic diamond pattern of diagonal cross lines and a darker brown mark on the head.

== Biology ==
The adults can be encountered from May through August feeding on nectar (especially on Anthriscus sylvestris). The larvae can be found in September. They are polyphagous, but mainly feed on leaves of Epilobium hirsutum, Chamerion angustifolium, Pteridium aquilinum and Salix.

== Distribution and habitat ==
This species can be found in hedgerows in most of Europe and the Nearctic realm.
