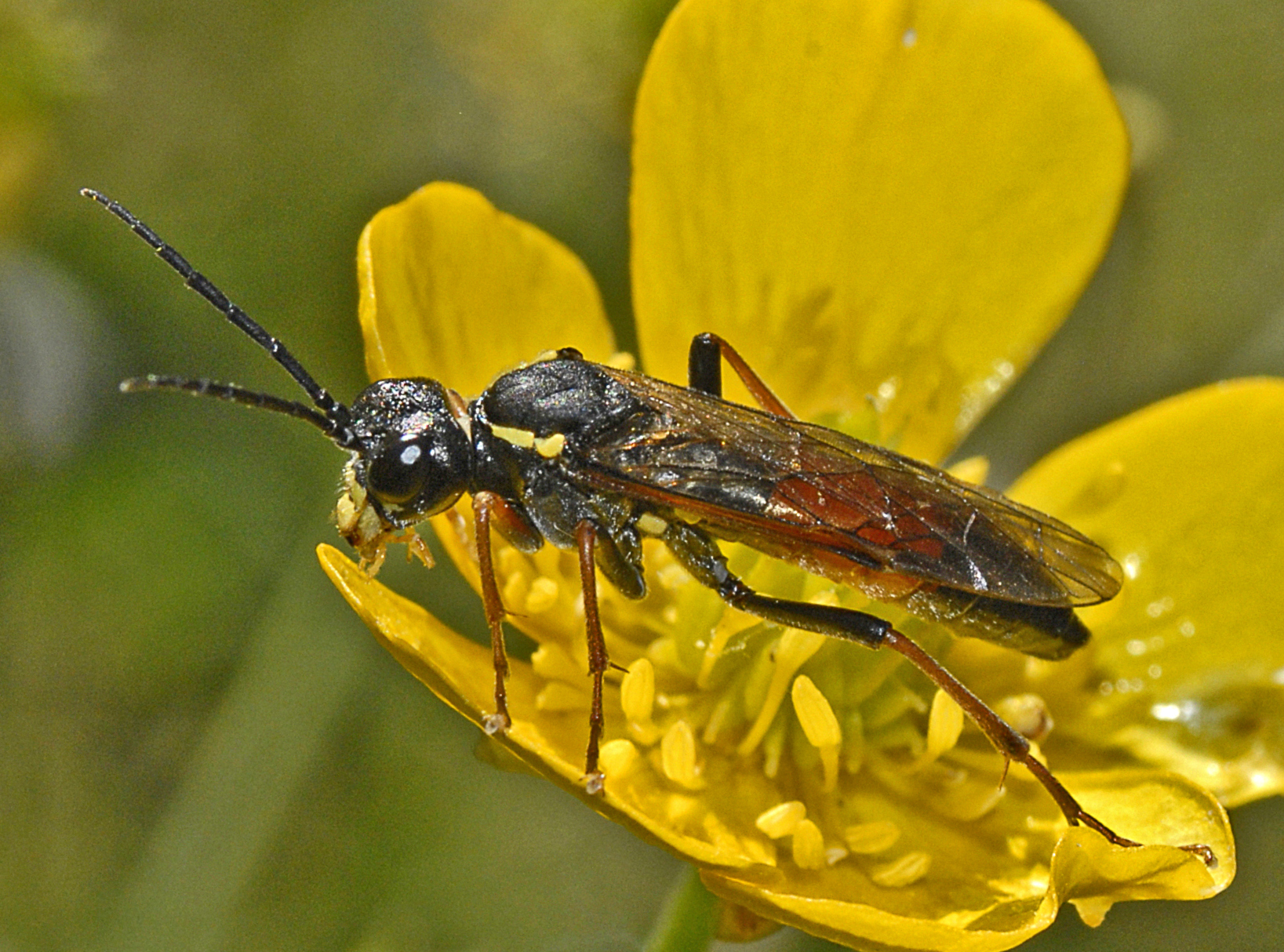
- Tenthredo moniliata on buttercup

Scientific classification
- Kingdom: Animalia
- Phylum: Arthropoda
- Class: Insecta
- Order: Hymenoptera
- Suborder: Symphyta
- Family: Tenthredinidae
- Genus: Tenthredo
- Species: T. moniliata

Binomial name
- Tenthredo moniliata Klug, 1817

= Tenthredo moniliata =

Species of sawfly

Tenthredo moniliata is a sawfly species belonging to the family Tenthredinidae (common sawflies).

== Distribution and habitat ==
These sawflies are present in most of European countries and in the eastern Palearctic realm. They usually occurs in humid areas (especially fens, swamps and ponds).

== Description ==
Tenthredo monilita can reach a length of about 10–12 millimetres (0.39–0.47 in). These sawflies are quite variable. They usually have a black head, with yellow mouth parts. The antennae are entirely black. On the front of the thorax there is a small yellow stripe. On each side of the 1st tergite there is a white spot. The 3rd, 4th and 5th segments of the abdomen are reddish, while the apical segments are black. The legs are mostly brown, with black femurs. Wings are mostly transparent, with brown veins. In males the abdomen is more reddish.

== Biology ==
The adults can be encountered from May through July feeding on nectar and pollen of flowers. Main host plant is menyanthes (Menyanthes trifoliata), but host plants also include buttercups (Ranunculus species), oregano (Origanum vulgare) and bush cinquefoil (Dasiphora fruticosa).
