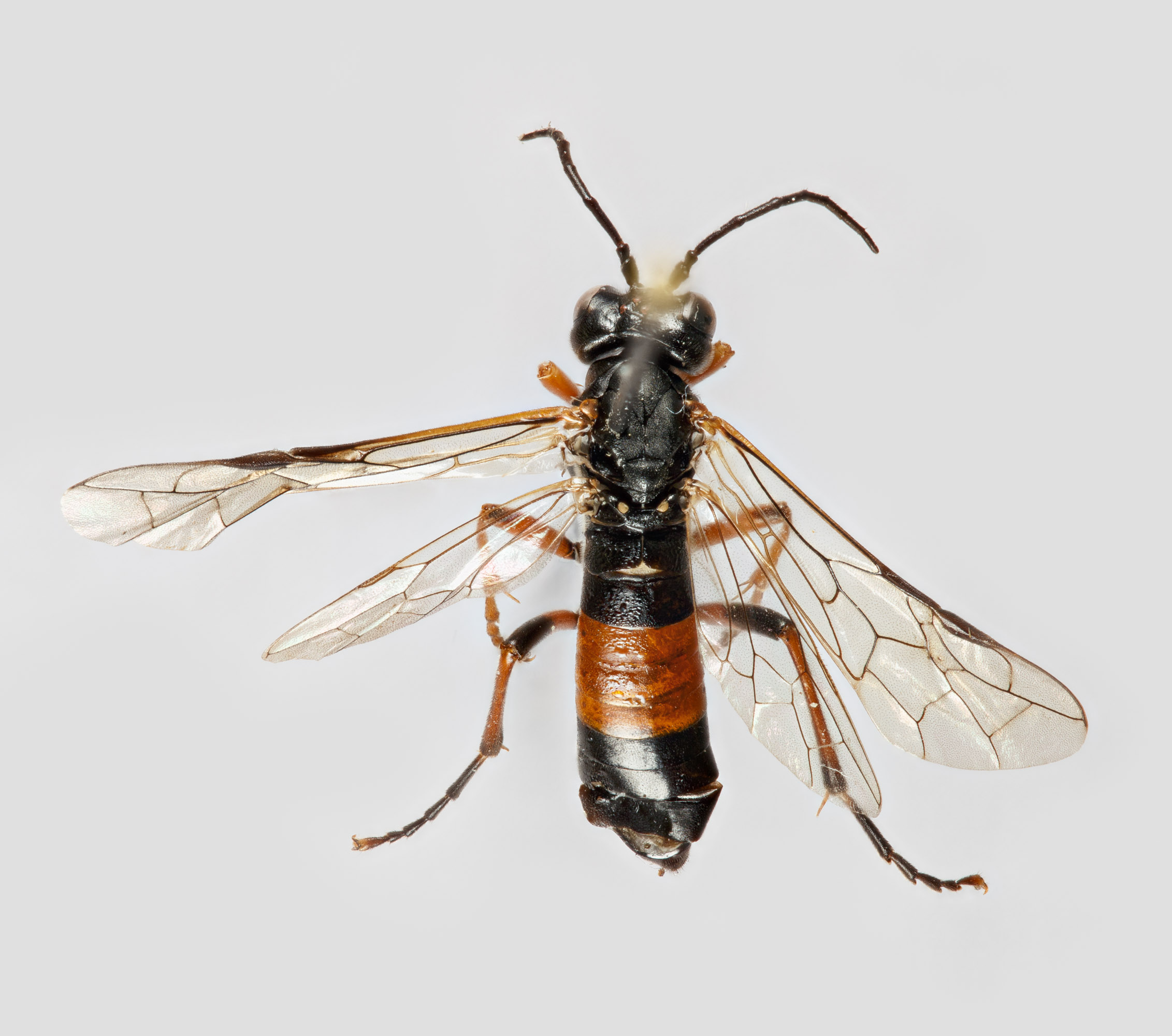
- Tenthredo atra female form Norway

Scientific classification
- Kingdom: Animalia
- Phylum: Arthropoda
- Class: Insecta
- Order: Hymenoptera
- Suborder: Symphyta
- Family: Tenthredinidae
- Genus: Tenthredo
- Species: T. atra

Binomial name
- Tenthredo atra Linnaeus, 1758

= Tenthredo atra =

Species of sawfly

Tenthredo atra is a Palearctic species of sawfly. It is a pollinator of the plant Euphorbia serrata.
