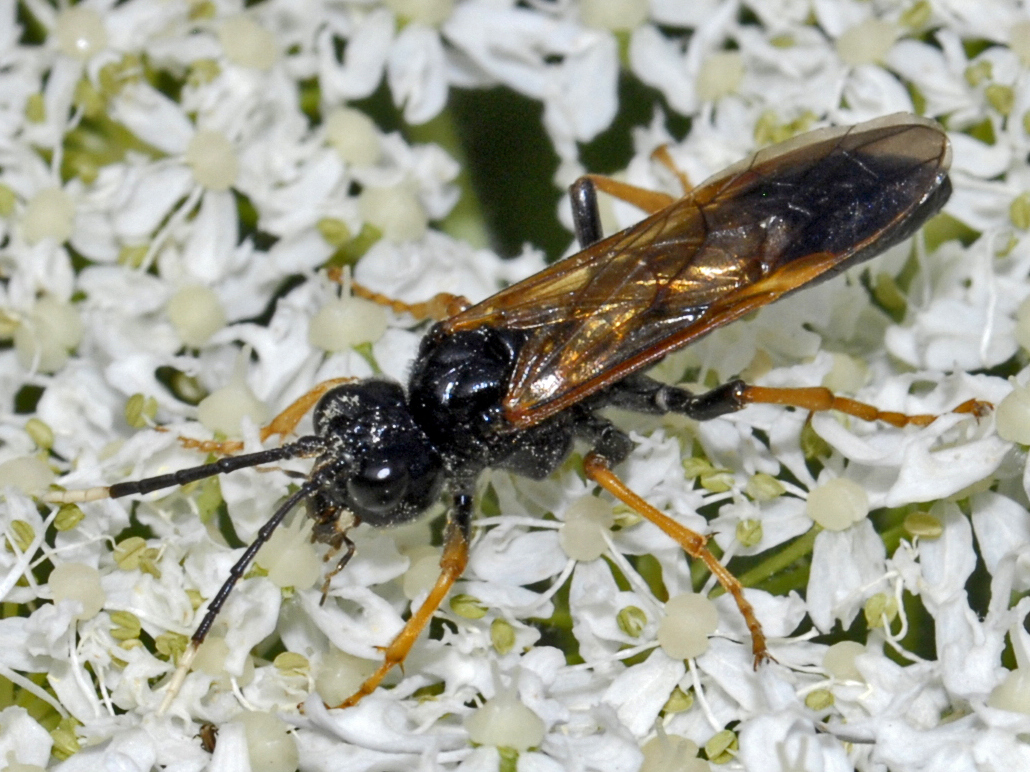
- Dorsal view
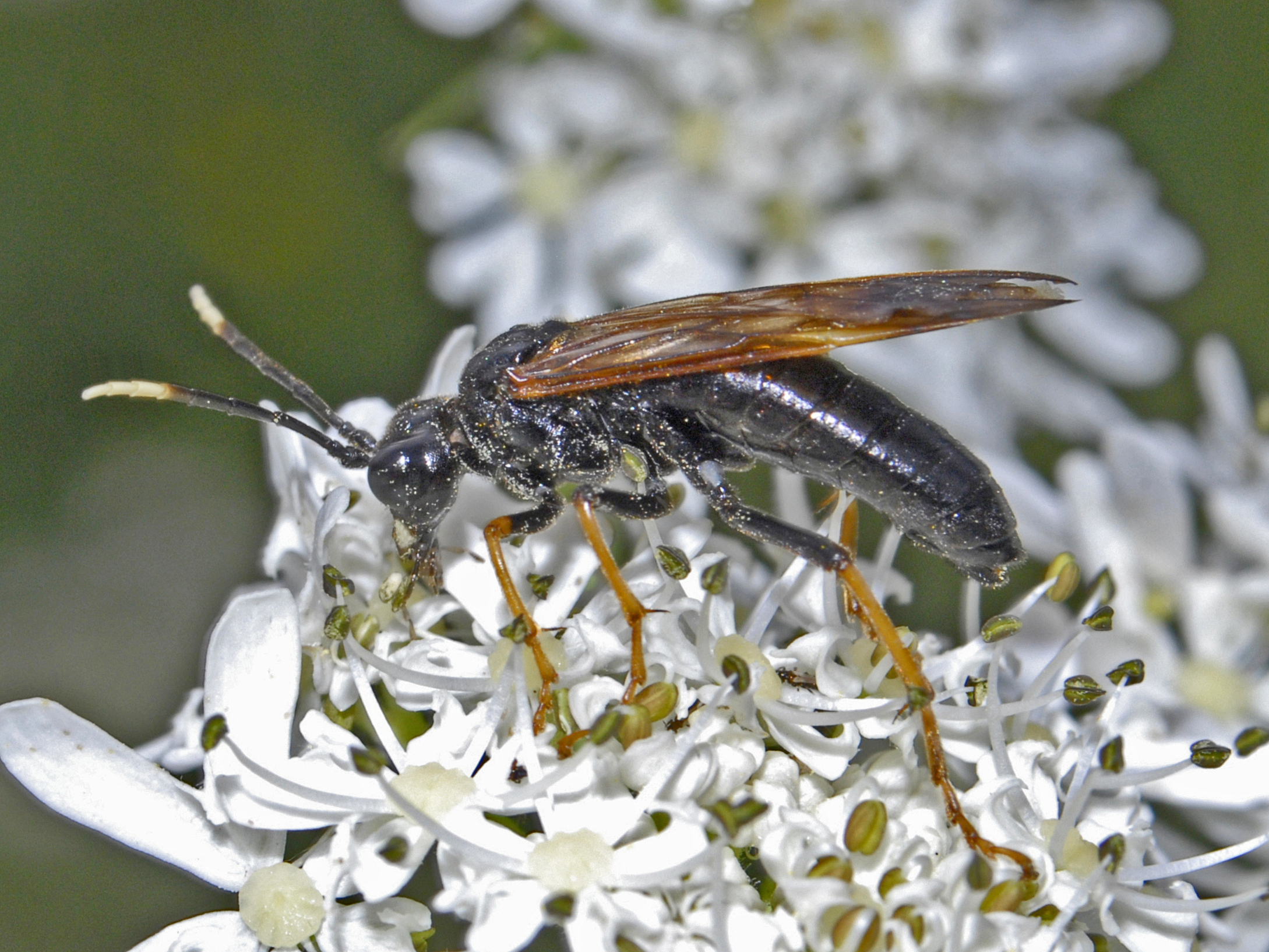
- Side view

Scientific classification
- Domain: Eukaryota
- Kingdom: Animalia
- Phylum: Arthropoda
- Class: Insecta
- Order: Hymenoptera
- Suborder: Symphyta
- Family: Tenthredinidae
- Genus: Tenthredo
- Species: T. crassa

Binomial name
- Tenthredo crassa Scopoli, 1763

Synonyms
- Tenthredo albicornis Fabricius, 1781

= Tenthredo crassa =

Species of sawfly

Tenthredo crassa is a sawfly species belonging to the family Tenthredinidae (common sawflies).

== Distribution and habitat ==
This species can be found in most of Europe. These sawflies inhabit meadows, edges of forests, hills and mountainous areas, at an elevation up to 1,500 metres (4,900 ft) above sea level.

== Description ==
Tenthredo crassa can reach a length of about 14–18 millimetres (0.55–0.71 in). These large sawflies have a black head, thorax and abdomen, with black femurs, yellowish tibiae and tarsi. Antennae are black, with white three final segments. The mandibles are whitish at the base. The wings are dark yellow along the outer edge, blackened at the apical third.

== Biology ==
Adults can be found from May to August, feeding on inflorescence of Apiaceae. Larves are monophagic feeding on Angelica species.

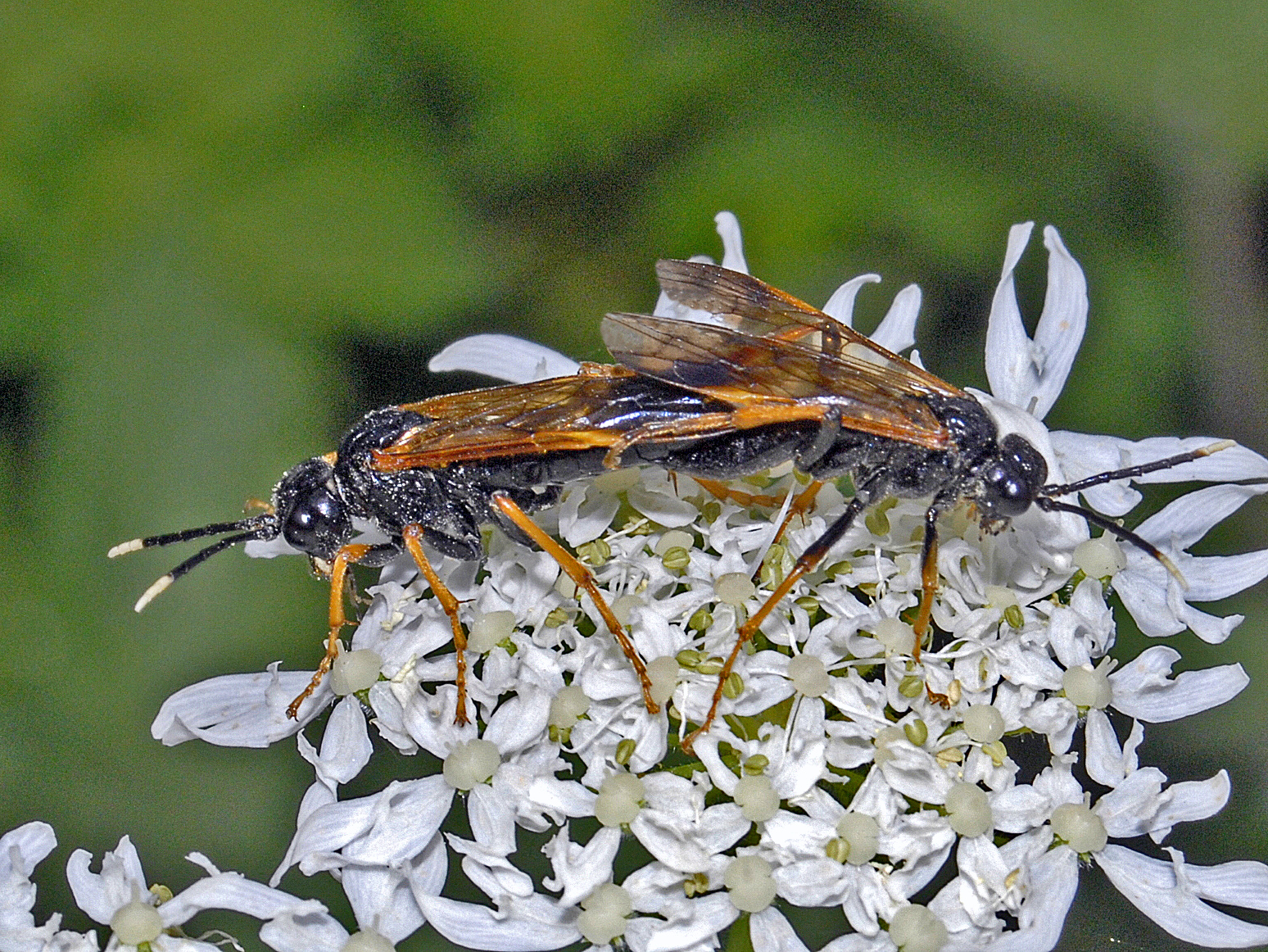
Mating pair
