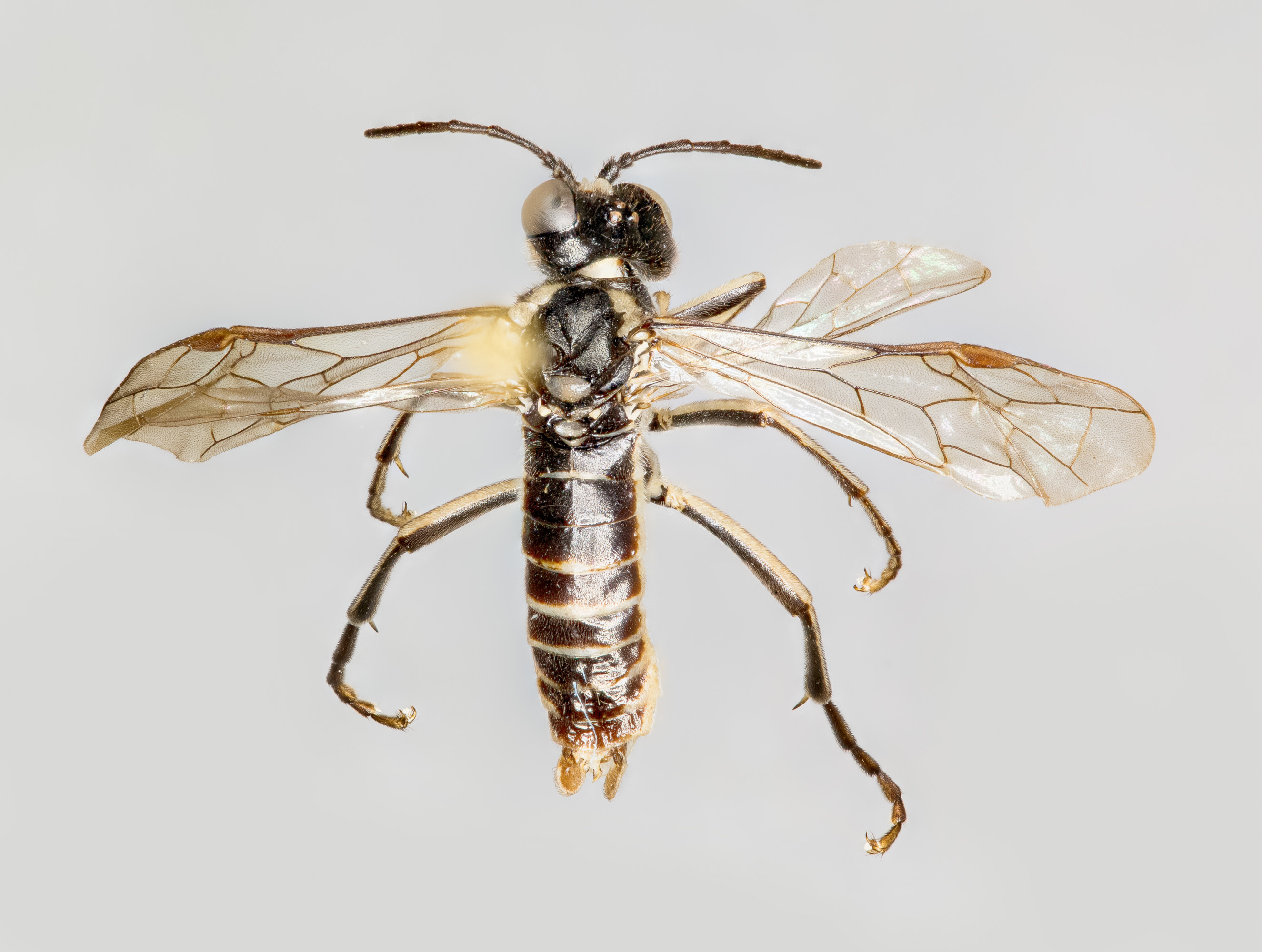
- Tenthredo obsoleta male Norway

Scientific classification
- Domain: Eukaryota
- Kingdom: Animalia
- Phylum: Arthropoda
- Class: Insecta
- Order: Hymenoptera
- Suborder: Symphyta
- Family: Tenthredinidae
- Genus: Tenthredo
- Species: T. obsoleta

Binomial name
- Tenthredo obsoleta Klug, 1817

= Tenthredo obsoleta =

Species of sawfly

Tenthredo obsoleta is a Palearctic species of sawfly.
