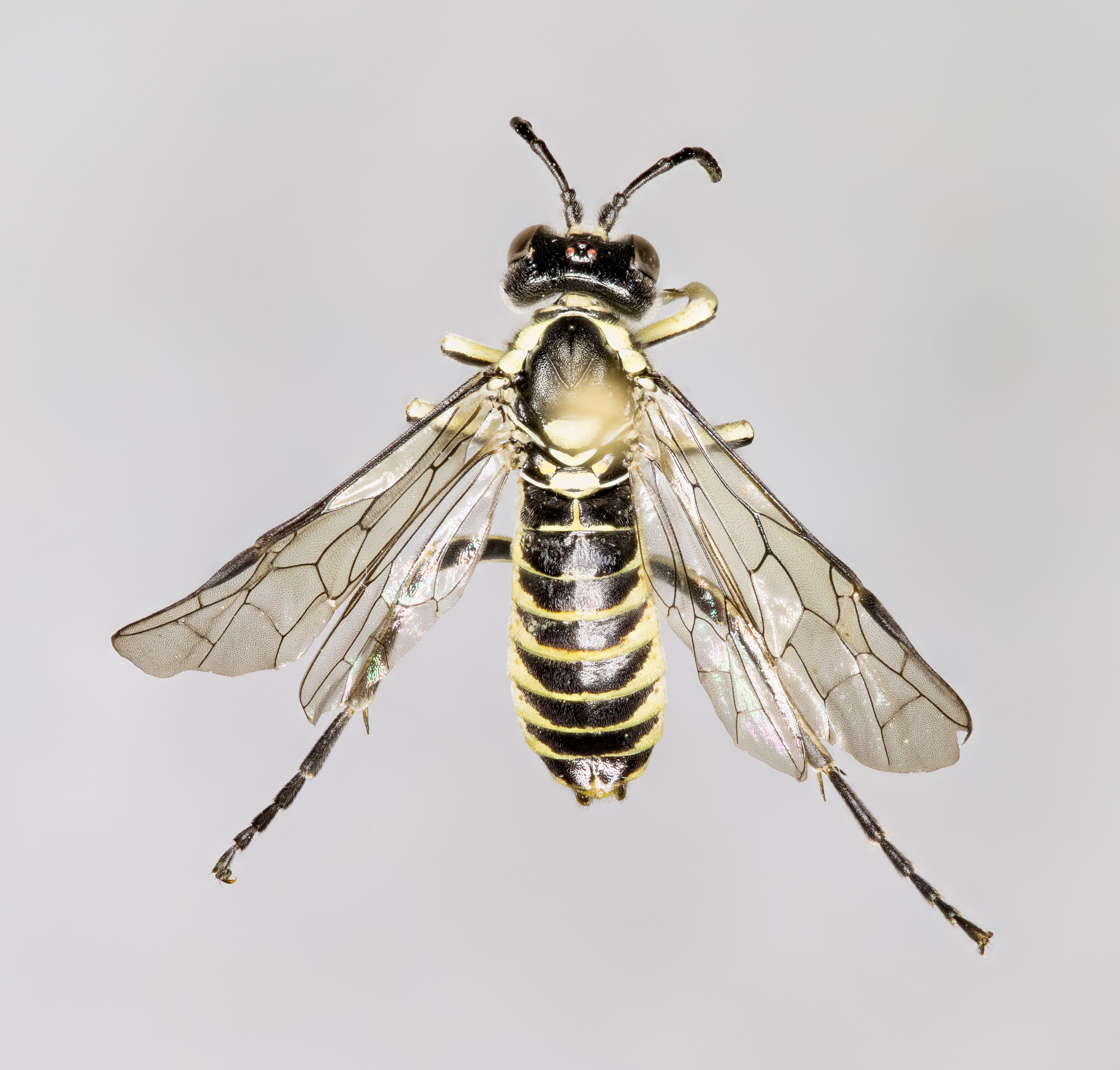
- Tenthredo mioceras Norway

Scientific classification
- Domain: Eukaryota
- Kingdom: Animalia
- Phylum: Arthropoda
- Class: Insecta
- Order: Hymenoptera
- Suborder: Symphyta
- Family: Tenthredinidae
- Genus: Tenthredo
- Species: T. mioceras

Binomial name
- Tenthredo mioceras (Enslin, 1912)

= Tenthredo mioceras =

Species of sawfly

Tenthredo mioceras is a Palearctic species of sawfly.
