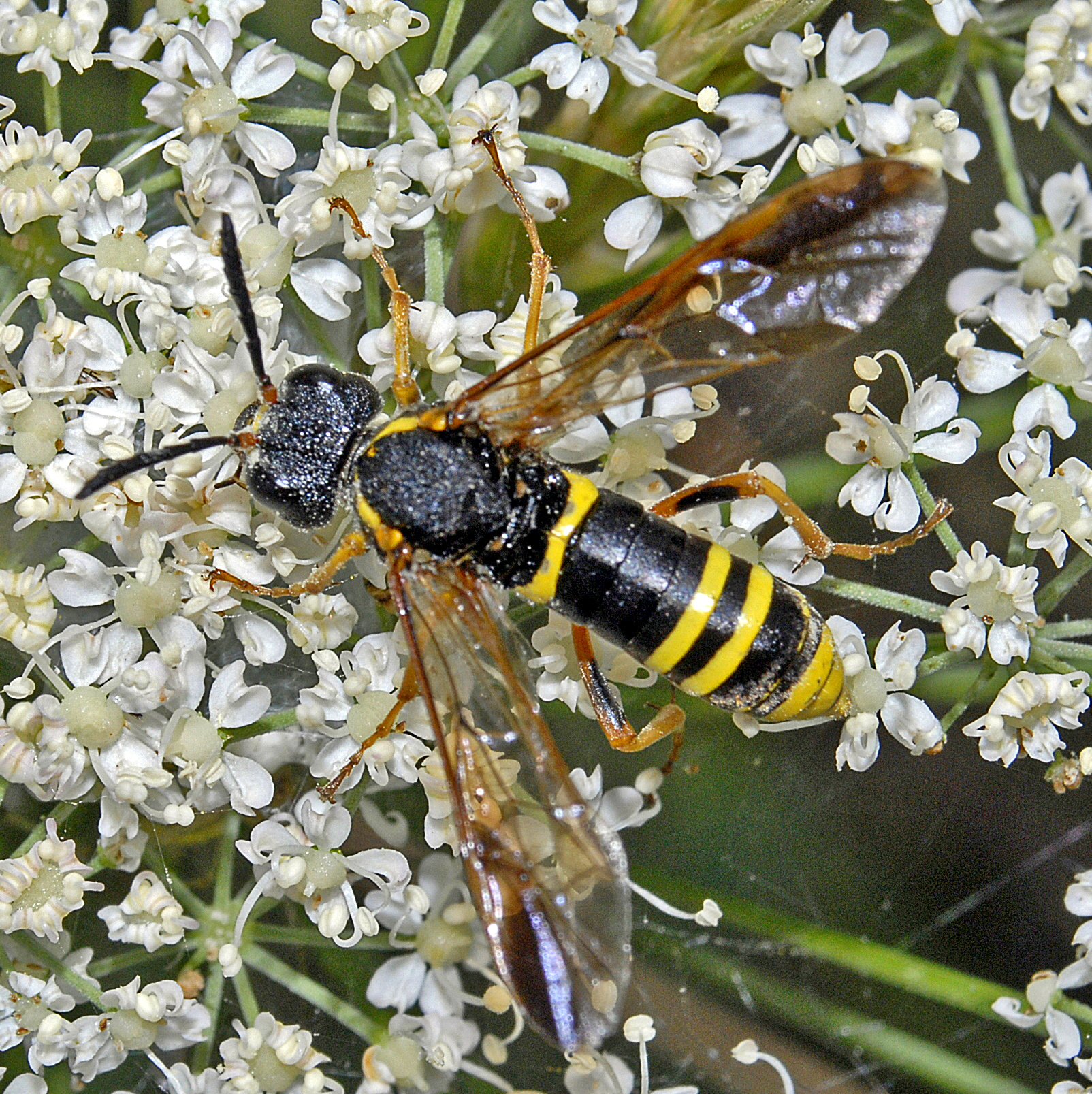
- Female

Scientific classification
- Kingdom: Animalia
- Phylum: Arthropoda
- Clade: Pancrustacea
- Class: Insecta
- Order: Hymenoptera
- Suborder: Symphyta
- Family: Tenthredinidae
- Genus: Tenthredo
- Species: T. vespa

Binomial name
- Tenthredo vespa Retzius, 1783

= Tenthredo vespa =

Species of sawfly

Tenthredo vespa is a sawfly species belonging to the family Tenthredinidae (common sawflies).

== Distribution and habitat ==
This species can be found in most of Europe. These sawflies prefer hedge rows and coastal meadows.

== Description ==
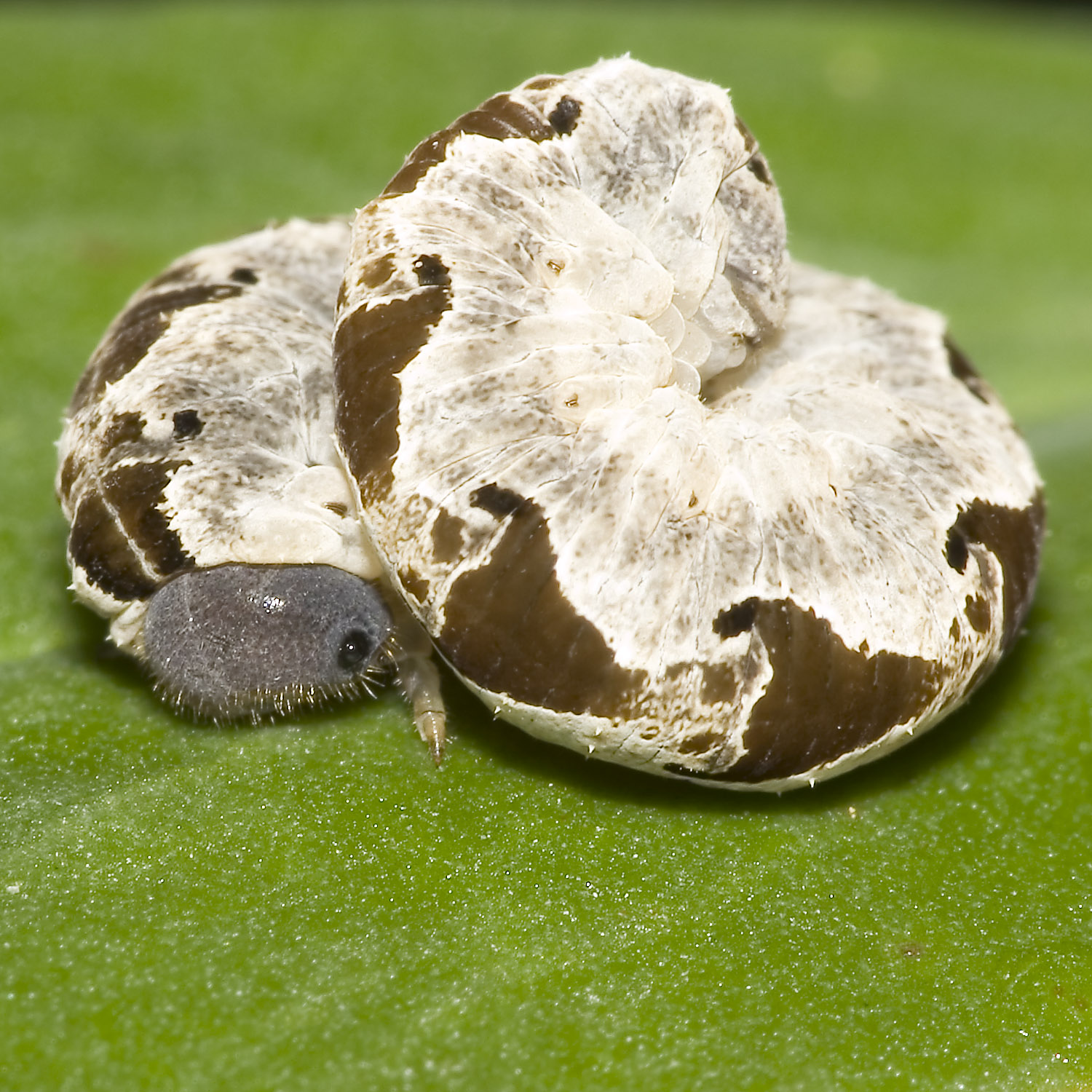
Larva of T. vespa

Tenthredo vespa or saw can reach a length of about 11–12 mm (0.43–0.47 in). These sawflies have black head and thorax. The first segment of the antennae is orange. The abdomen shows black and yellow bands that are reminiscent of wasps (hence the species name). The abdomen usually has yellow bands on the segments 1, 4, and 5, as well as 7, 8, and 9. Their wings have a pale brown color, with a dark spot on the tips. Larvae are whitish or bluish, with dorsal triangular, brown markings.

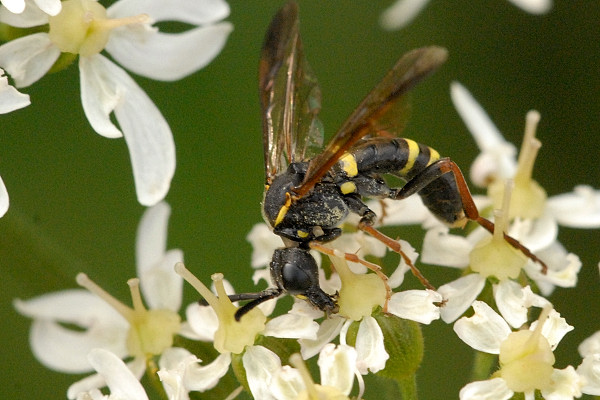
Tenthredo vespa, lateral view

== Biology ==
The adults can be encountered from May through September feeding on small insects and on nectar and pollen of flowers (especially on Apiaceae (Heracleum sphondylium). Larvae are polyphagous, mainly feeding on Lonicera periclymenum, Fraxinus excelsior, Viburnum opulus.
