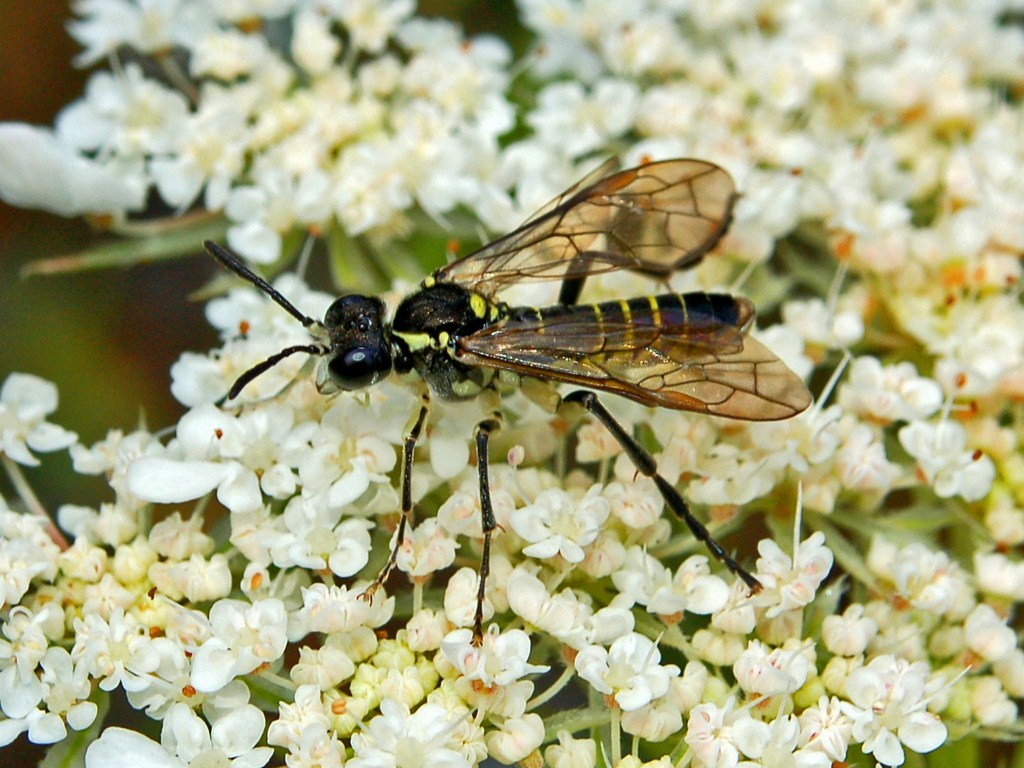
- Tenthredo arcuata from Italy
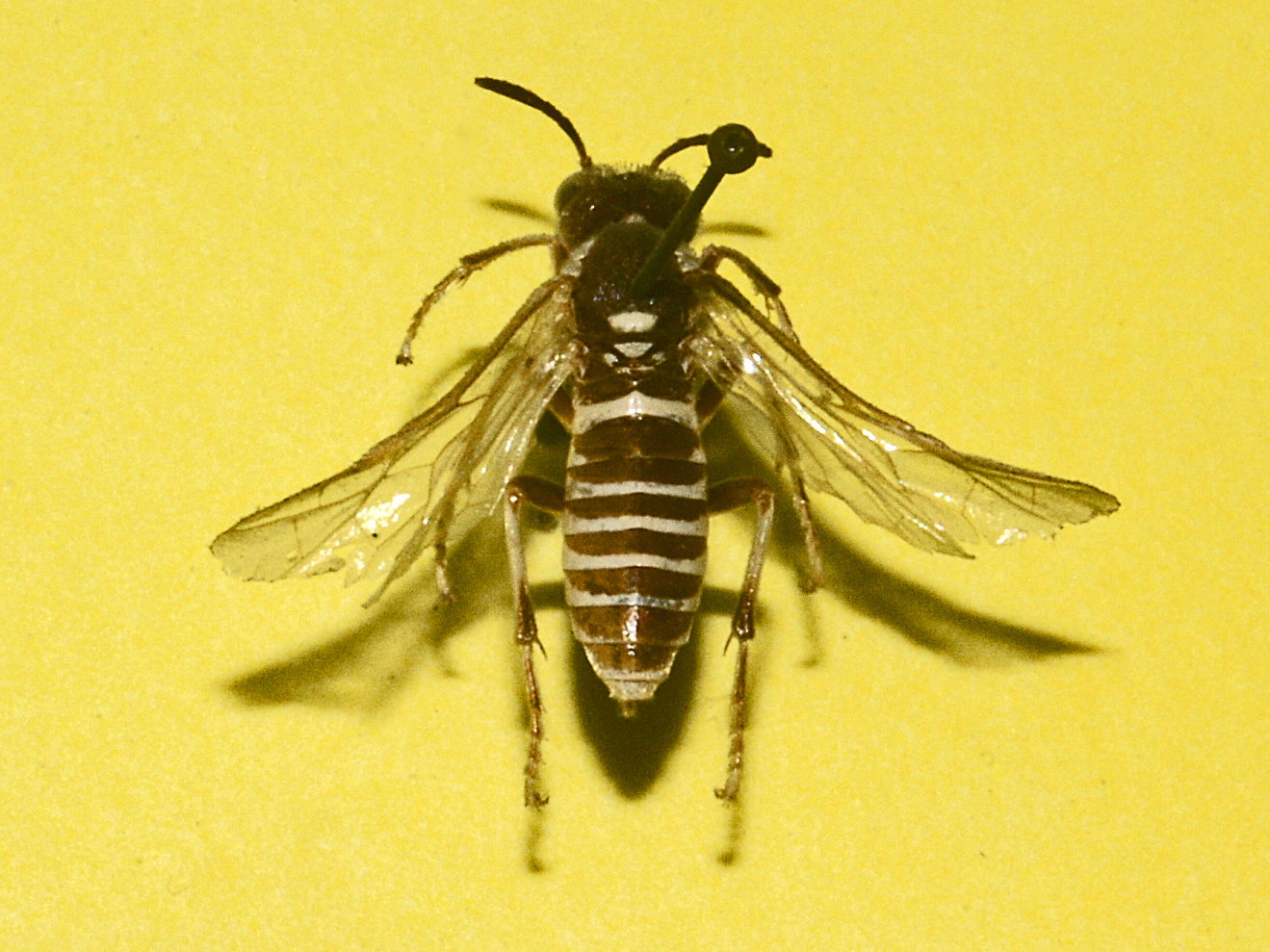
- Museum specimen of Tenthredo arcuata

Scientific classification
- Kingdom: Animalia
- Phylum: Arthropoda
- Class: Insecta
- Order: Hymenoptera
- Suborder: Symphyta
- Family: Tenthredinidae
- Genus: Tenthredo
- Species: T. arcuata

Binomial name
- Tenthredo arcuata Forster, 1771

= Tenthredo arcuata =

Species of sawfly

Tenthredo arcuata is a sawfly species of the family Tenthredinidae (common sawflies).

== Description ==
Tenthredo arcuata can reach a length of about 8–10 millimetres (0.31–0.39 in). These sawflies have a yellow to apple green body with black head and thorax . The upperside of the abdomen shows greeny-yellow and black bands. Wings have a pale brown color with a long brown pterostigma.

== Biology ==
The adults can be encountered from April through July, feeding on small insects and on nectar and pollen of flowers (especially on Apiaceae species, on Polygonum bistorta, Tanacetum vulgare and Viburnum opulus). The larvae feed at night on leaves of Trifolium repens and Lotus corniculatus.

== Distribution and habitat ==
This species can be found in most of Europe. These sawflies prefer flower rich meadows.

== Gallery ==
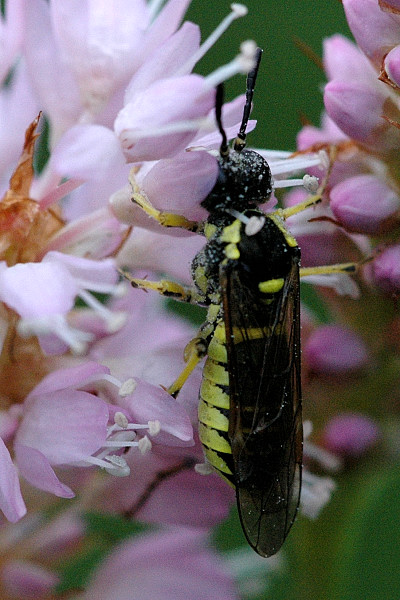
T. arcuata

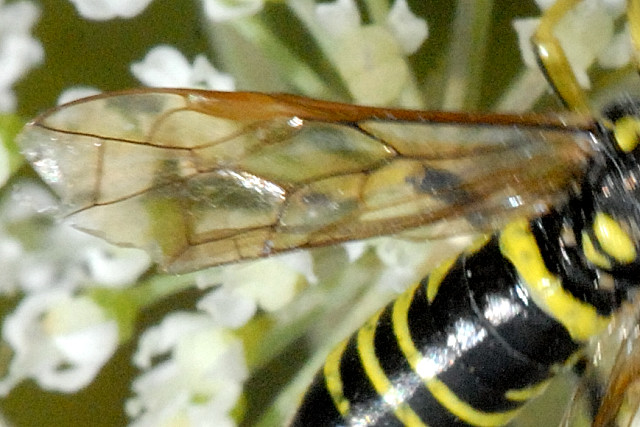
Wing of T. arcuata
