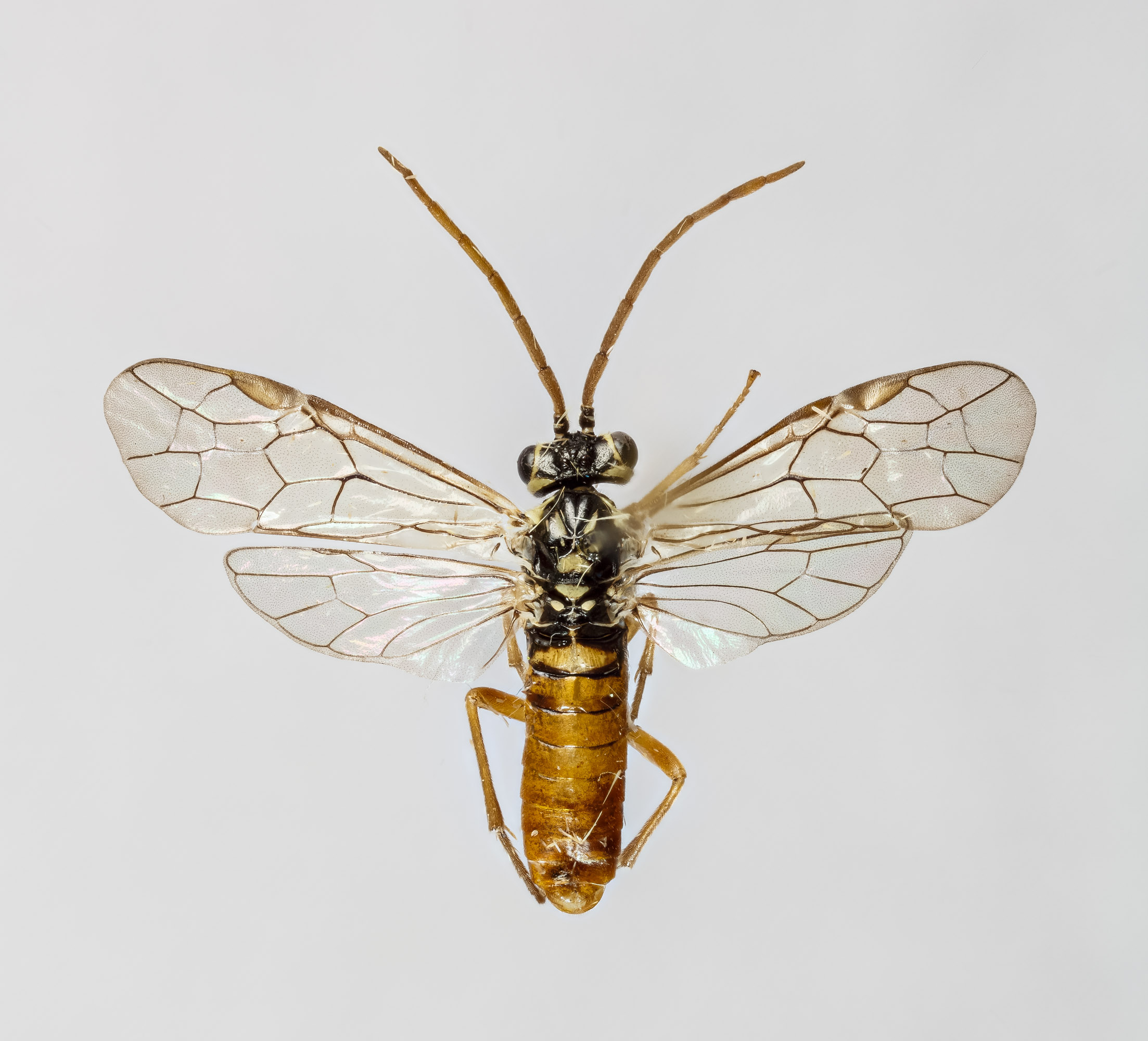
- Perineura rubi

Scientific classification
- Kingdom: Animalia
- Phylum: Arthropoda
- Clade: Pancrustacea
- Class: Insecta
- Order: Hymenoptera
- Suborder: Symphyta
- Family: Tenthredinidae
- Genus: Perineura; Hartig, 1837

= Perineura =

Genus of sawflies

Perineura is a genus of sawflies belonging to the family Tenthredinidae.

The species of this genus are found in Europe and North America.

Species:

- Perineura rubi (Panzer, 1805)
- Perineura turbata Rohwer
