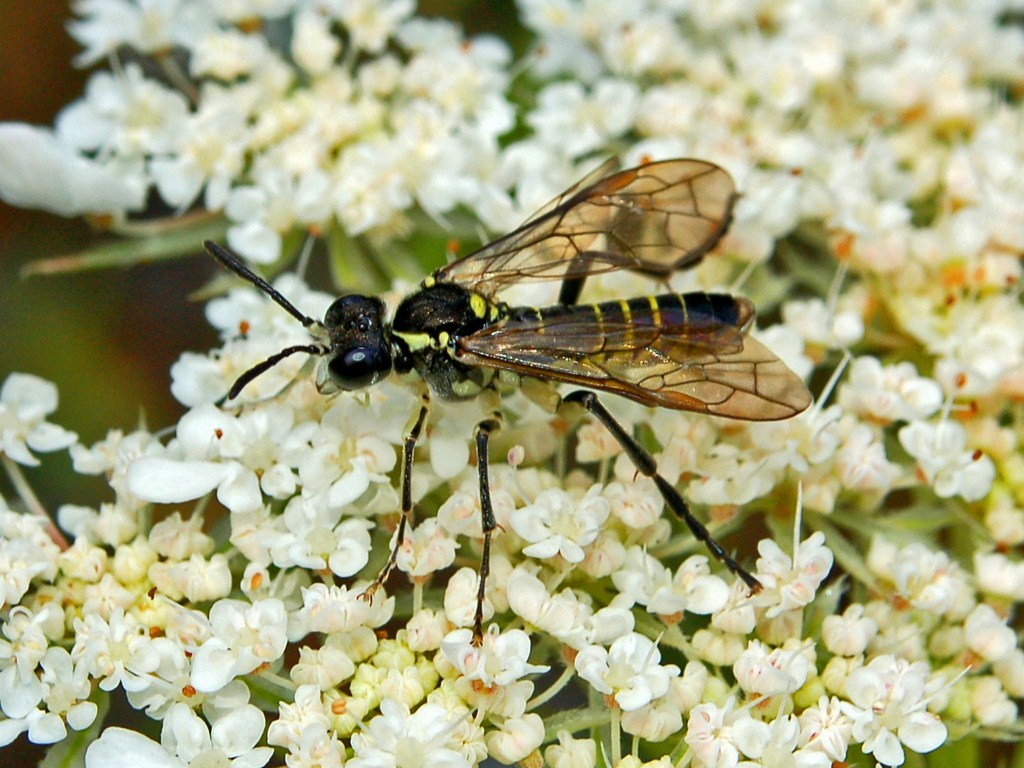
- Tenthredo notha

Scientific classification
- Kingdom: Animalia
- Phylum: Arthropoda
- Class: Insecta
- Order: Hymenoptera
- Suborder: Symphyta
- Family: Tenthredinidae
- Subfamily: Tenthredininae; Latreille, 1802

Type genus
- Tenthredo Linnaeus, 1758

Tribes
- see text

= Tenthredininae =

Subfamily of sawflies

Tenthredininae is a subfamily of sawflies within the family Tenthredinidae, the largest sawfly family. It consists of 28 genera, including the type genus Tenthredo. It also includes most of the larger and more colourful members of the family.

== Distribution ==
The subfamily is distributed across the Northern Hemisphere and holarctic.

== Taxonomy ==
The subfamily is divided into seven tribes. An eighth tribe, Sioblini, containing Conaspidia and Siobla has been elevated to subfamily status as Sioblinae.

- Cromaphya Rohwer, 1921
- Lagidina Malaise, 1945
- Ussurinus Malaise, 1931
- †Nortonella Rohwer, 1908
- †Sambia Vilhelmsen & Engel, 2012
- †Taeniurites Cockerell, 1917
- †Tenthredoides J. Zhang, 1989

=== Tribe Beldoneini Wei, 1997 ===
- Beldonea Cameron, 1899

=== Tribe Macrophyini Benson, 1946 ===
- Deda Gibson, 1980
- Macrophya Dahlbom, 1835
- Pachyprotasis Hartig, 1837

=== Tribe Neocolochelynini Wei & Nie, 1998 ===
- Colochela Malaise,1937
- Colochelyna Konow, 1898
- Neocolochelyna Malaise, 1937
- Neocorymbas Saini et al., 1985

=== Tribe Perineurini Rohwer, 1911 ===
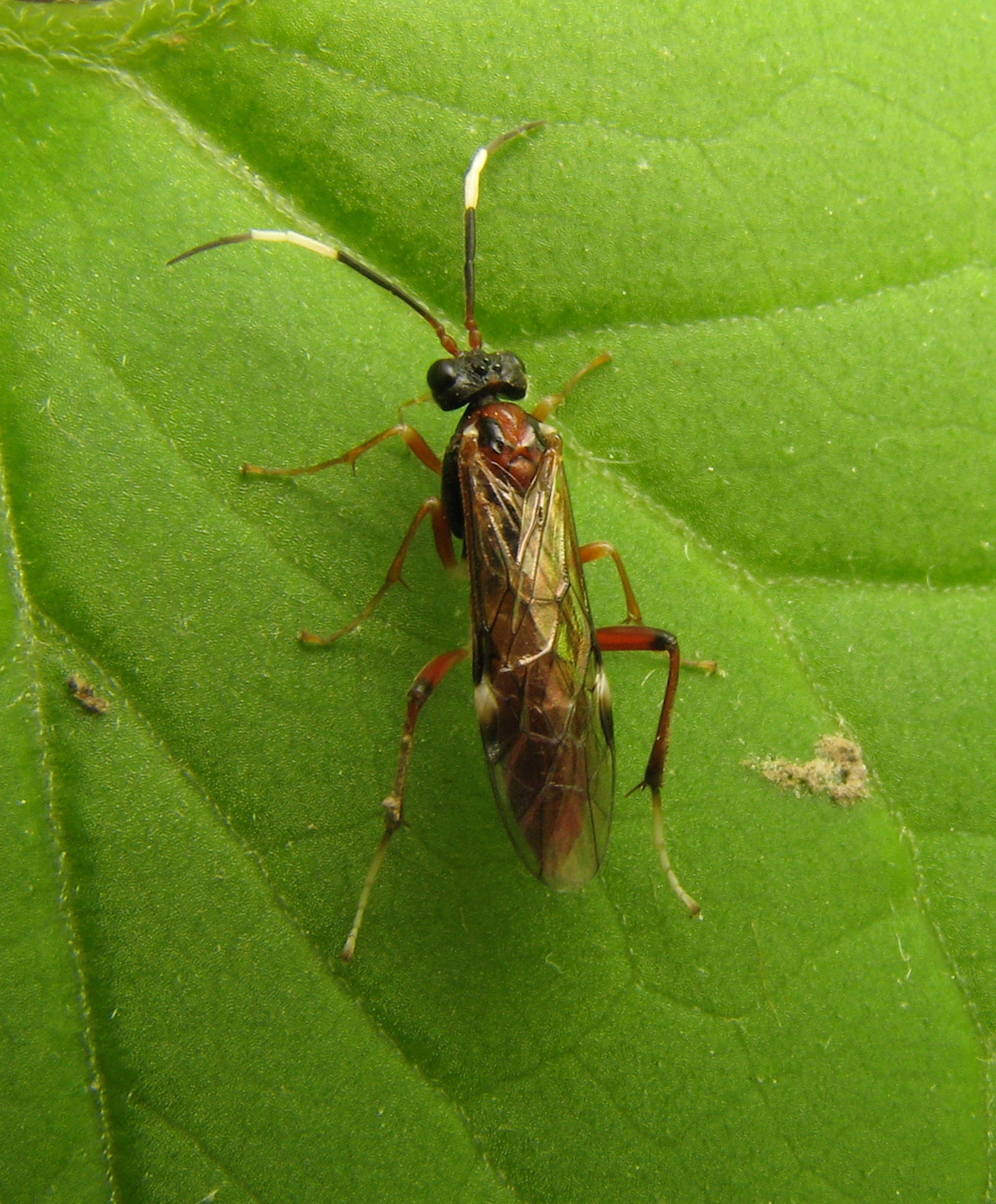
Leucopelmonus annulicornis (tribe Perineurini)

- Leucopelmonus MacGillivray, 1916
- Perineura Rohwer, 1911

=== Tribe Sciapterygini Benson, 1946 ===
- Filacus Smith & Gibson, 1984
- Sciapteryx Stephens, 1835
- Tianmuthredo Wei, 1997
- Zaschizonyx Ashmead, 1898
- †Renothredo Wei, 1998

=== Tribe Tenthredinini Latreille, 1802 ===
- Lagium Konow, 1904
- Rhogogaster Konow, 1884
- Tenthredo Linnaeus, 1758
- Tyloceridius Malaise, 1945

=== Tribe Tenthredopsini Benson, 1946 ===
- Aglaostigma Kirby, 1882
- Tenthredopsis Costa, 1859
