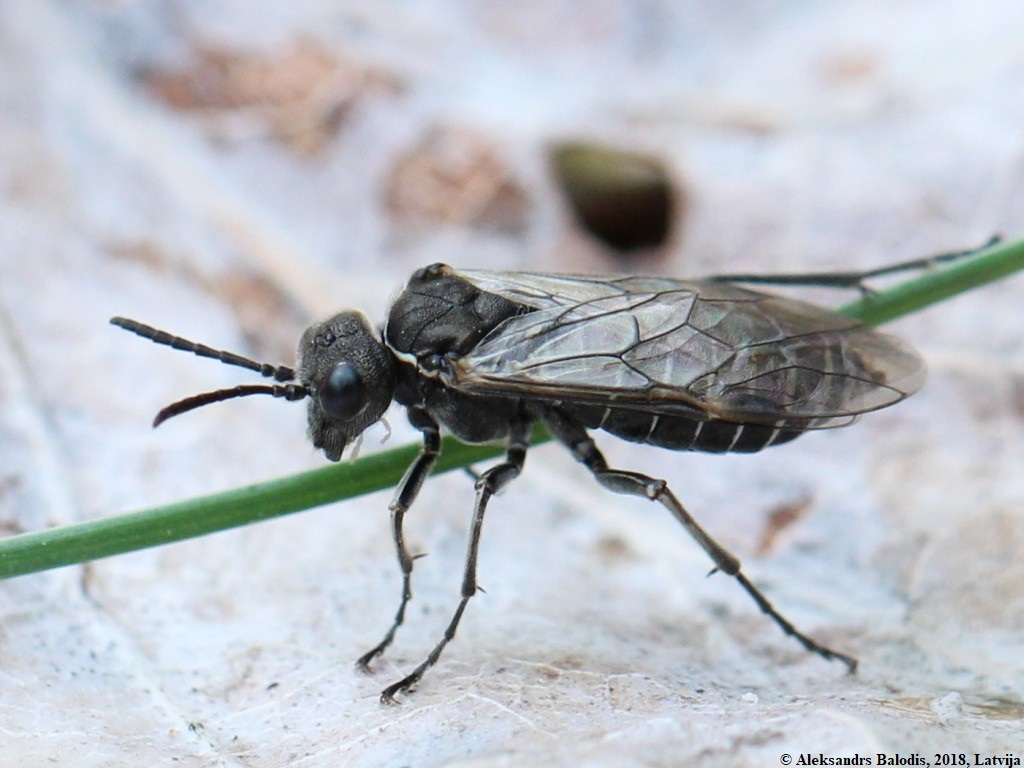
- Sciapteryx consobrina

Scientific classification
- Kingdom: Animalia
- Phylum: Arthropoda
- Clade: Pancrustacea
- Class: Insecta
- Order: Hymenoptera
- Suborder: Symphyta
- Family: Tenthredinidae
- Genus: Sciapteryx; Stephens, 1835

= Sciapteryx =

Genus of insects

Sciapteryx is a genus of insects belonging to the family Tenthredinidae.

The species of this genus are found in Europe.

== Species ==
The following species are recognised in the genus Sciapteryx:

- Sciapteryx byzantina Benson, 1968
- Sciapteryx caucasica Dovnar-Zapolskij, 1930
- Sciapteryx circassica Dovnar-Zapolskij, 1930
- Sciapteryx cleopatra Benson, 1954
- Sciapteryx consobrina (Klug, 1816)
- Sciapteryx costalis (Fabricius, 1775)
- Sciapteryx dovnari Ushinskij, 1940
- Sciapteryx lactipennis Konow, 1903
- Sciapteryx laeta Konow, 1891
- Sciapteryx levantina André, 1881
- Sciapteryx montana Dovnar-Zapolskij, 1930
- Sciapteryx semenowi Jakowlew, 1886
- Sciapteryx verticalis Muche, 1973
