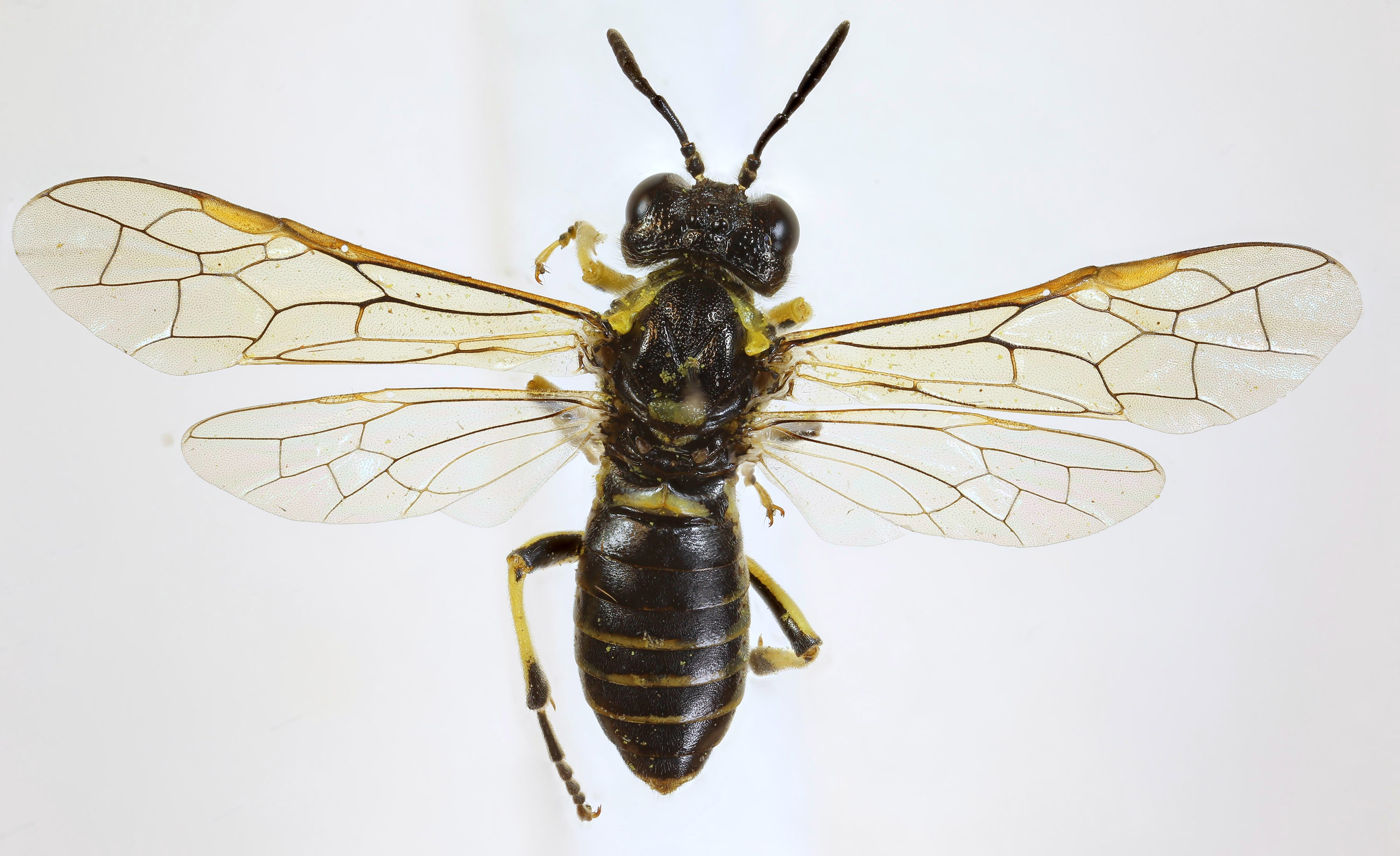
- Tenthredo brevicornis female, Minera, North Wales

Scientific classification
- Domain: Eukaryota
- Kingdom: Animalia
- Phylum: Arthropoda
- Class: Insecta
- Order: Hymenoptera
- Suborder: Symphyta
- Family: Tenthredinidae
- Genus: Tenthredo
- Species: T. brevicornis

Binomial name
- Tenthredo brevicornis Konow, 1886

= Tenthredo brevicornis =

Species of sawfly

Tenthredo brevicornis is a Palearctic species of sawfly.
