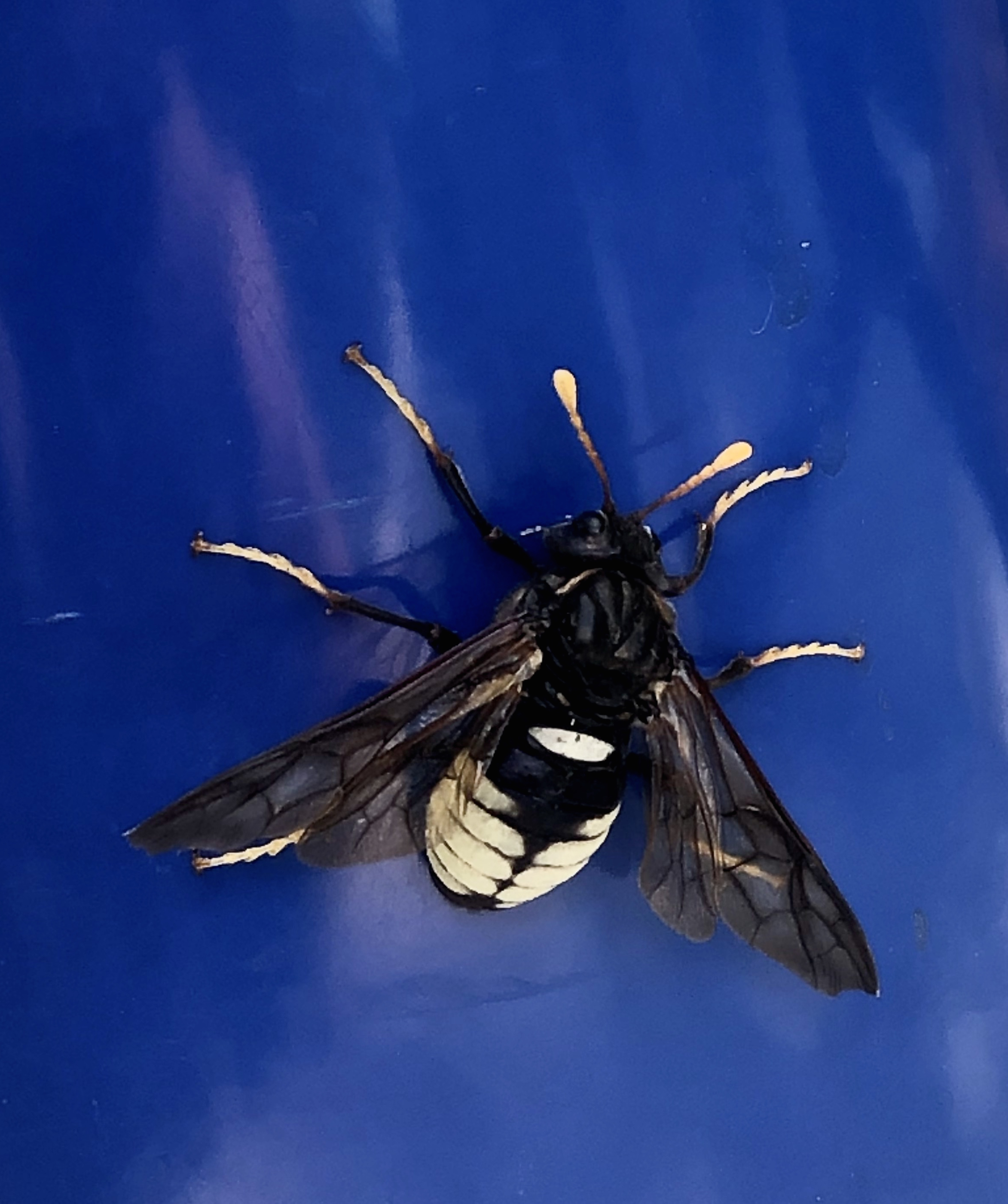
- An adult Elm sawfly

Scientific classification
- Kingdom: Animalia
- Phylum: Arthropoda
- Clade: Pancrustacea
- Class: Insecta
- Order: Hymenoptera
- Suborder: Symphyta
- Family: Cimbicidae
- Genus: Cimbex
- Species: C. americanus

Binomial name
- Cimbex americanus Leach, 1817

Synonyms
- Cimbex americana Leach, 1817

= Cimbex americanus =

Species of sawfly

Cimbex americanus, the elm sawfly, is a species of sawfly in the family Cimbicidae. This is a very large species of Hymenoptera, with adults measuring 3 cm and larvae reaching 5 cm long. If captured, adults may buzz and use their powerful spiny legs defensively. However, like other sawflies, this species does not possess a sting. The wasp Opheltes glaucopterus is a parasite of the prepupae stage of this sawfly.

== Taxonomy ==
This species was originally described as Cimbex americana by William Elford Leach, who treated the genus as feminine. However, Cimbex comes from a masculine Greek noun, and the International Commission on Zoological Nomenclature thus requires masculine species. Thus, its correct name is Cimbex americanus.
