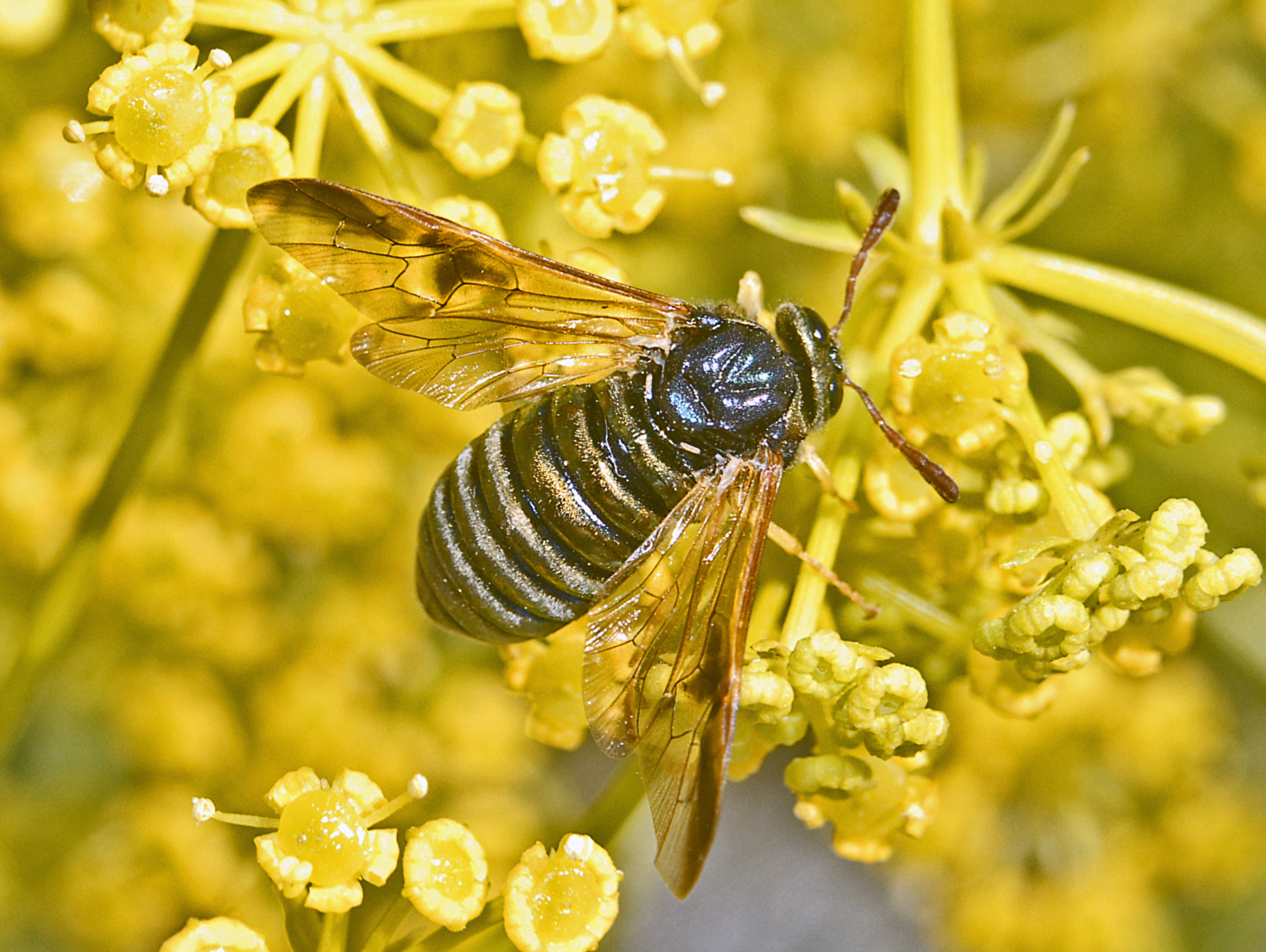
- Female of Abia sericea feeding on Ferulago galbanifera

Scientific classification
- Kingdom: Animalia
- Phylum: Arthropoda
- Class: Insecta
- Order: Hymenoptera
- Suborder: Symphyta
- Family: Cimbicidae
- Genus: Abia
- Species: A. sericea

Binomial name
- Abia sericea (Linnaeus 1767)

= Abia sericea =

Species of sawfly

Abia sericea, common name club horned sawfly or scabious sawfly, is a species of sawflies belonging to the family Cimbicidae.

== Distribution and habitat ==
This species can be found in most of European countries. It mainly occurs in wet meadows and forests, but its narrow habitat is restricted to the range of its host plant.

== Description ==
Abia sericea can reach a length of 10–12 millimetres (0.39–0.47 in). The adults have a large body with a showy metallic green-golden or bronze abdomen. The thorax is black, with bluish sheen and it is slightly hairy. Wings are transparent, with brown markings in the middle. Antennae are yellow-reddish, while other species in this genus have totally or partially black antennae. Legs are yellow, with black thighs at their base.

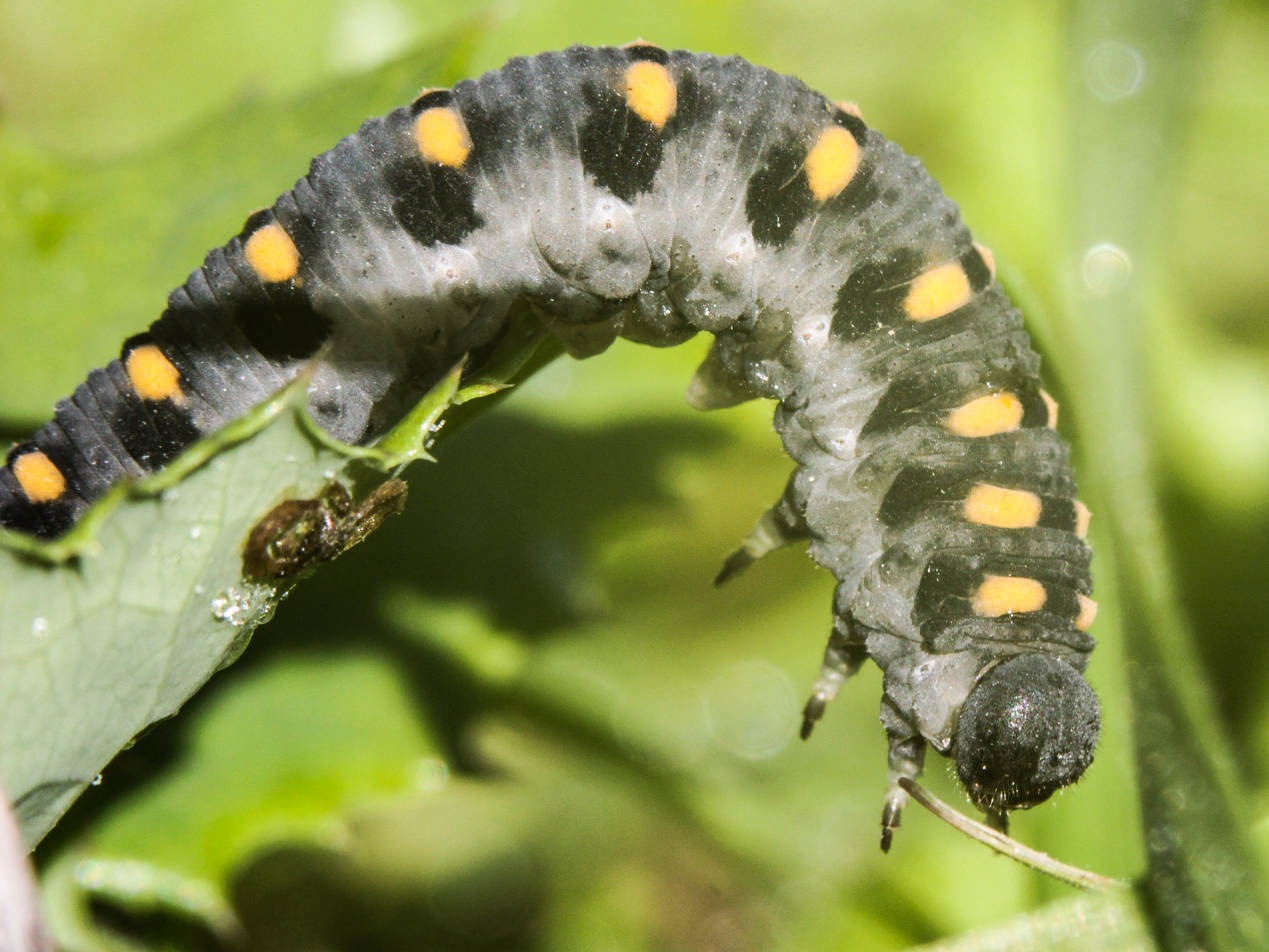
Larvae of Abia sericea

== Biology ==
Adults can be seen from May to October feeding on nectar of Devil's-bit Scabious (Succisa pratensis), of Ferulago galbanifera (syn. F. campestris) and of the giant fennel (Ferula communis).

Larva can reach a length of about 30 millimetres (1.2 in). They have a sandy background colour with black and yellow spots. They are oligophagous, mainly feeding between June and September on Devil's-bit Scabious (Succisa pratensis), Field Scabious (Knautia arvensis), cream scabious (Scabiosa ochroleuca ) and on various Dipsacus species.
