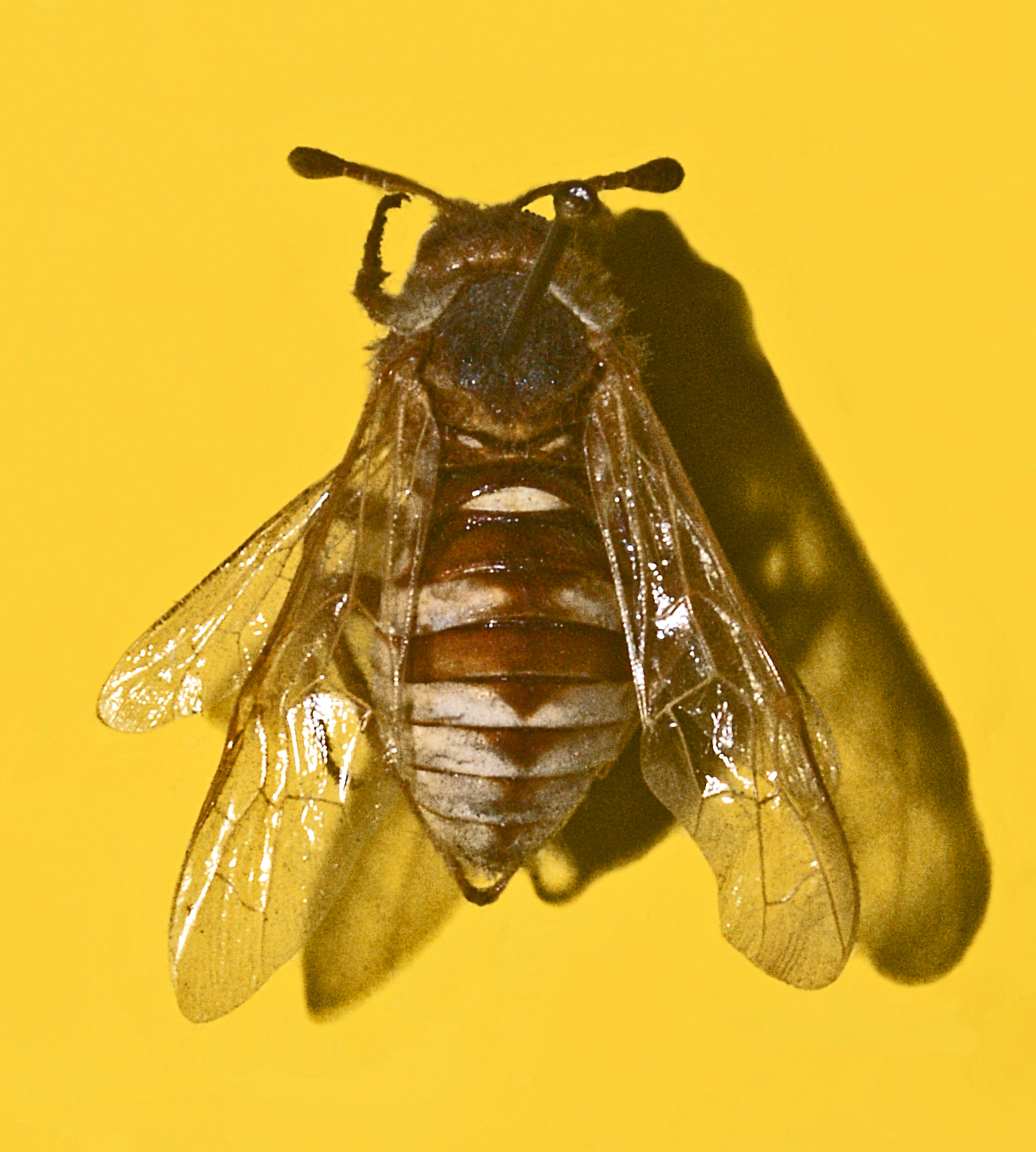
- Cimbex quadrimaculatus. Museum specimen

Scientific classification
- Kingdom: Animalia
- Phylum: Arthropoda
- Clade: Pancrustacea
- Class: Insecta
- Order: Hymenoptera
- Suborder: Symphyta
- Family: Cimbicidae
- Genus: Cimbex
- Species: C. quadrimaculatus

Binomial name
- Cimbex quadrimaculatus (O.F. Müller, 1766)

Synonyms
- Cimbex quadrimaculata (Müller, 1766); Cimbex humeralis (Geoffroy, 1785); Palaeocimbex quadrimaculatus (Müller, 1766); Tenthredo quadrimaculata Müller, 1766

= Cimbex quadrimaculatus =

Species of sawfly

Cimbex quadrimaculatus is a species of sawflies in the family Cimbicidae.

== Taxonomy ==
Cimbex quadrimaculatus was formerly classified in the genus Palaeocimbex along with four other species and was the type species of the subgenus Deuterocimbex. Both taxa have since been synonymized under the genus Cimbex.

== Description ==
Cimbex quadrimaculatus is a large species that can reach an adult length of about 19–21 millimetres (0.75–0.83 in). The body is dark brown to black with extensive yellow markings on the pronotum and abdomen. The wings are lightly infuscate, while the antennae are predominantly orange with darker scapes.

Their larvae are whitish with yellow and black markings. The average length of these larvae can reach about 20 millimetres (0.79 in), with a maximum of about 43 millimetres (1.7 in) in last instars.

== Biology ==
Cimbex quadrimaculatus is considered one of the serious pests of almonds. Other notable host plants include Crataegus monogyna, Prunus cerasus, and Prunus domestica.

A single generation is produced each year. Eggs are laid in the early summer. After hatching, the larvae eat from the edges of their host plants until spinning a cocoon. They then enter diapause over the winter as a pre-pupa. They pupate the following spring.

Larvae and pupae of Cimbex quadrimaculatus are parasitized by three species of ichneumonid wasp: Listrognathus mactator, Opheltes glaucopterus, and Phobetes nigriceps.

== Distribution ==
This species is present in Europe and in the Near East.
