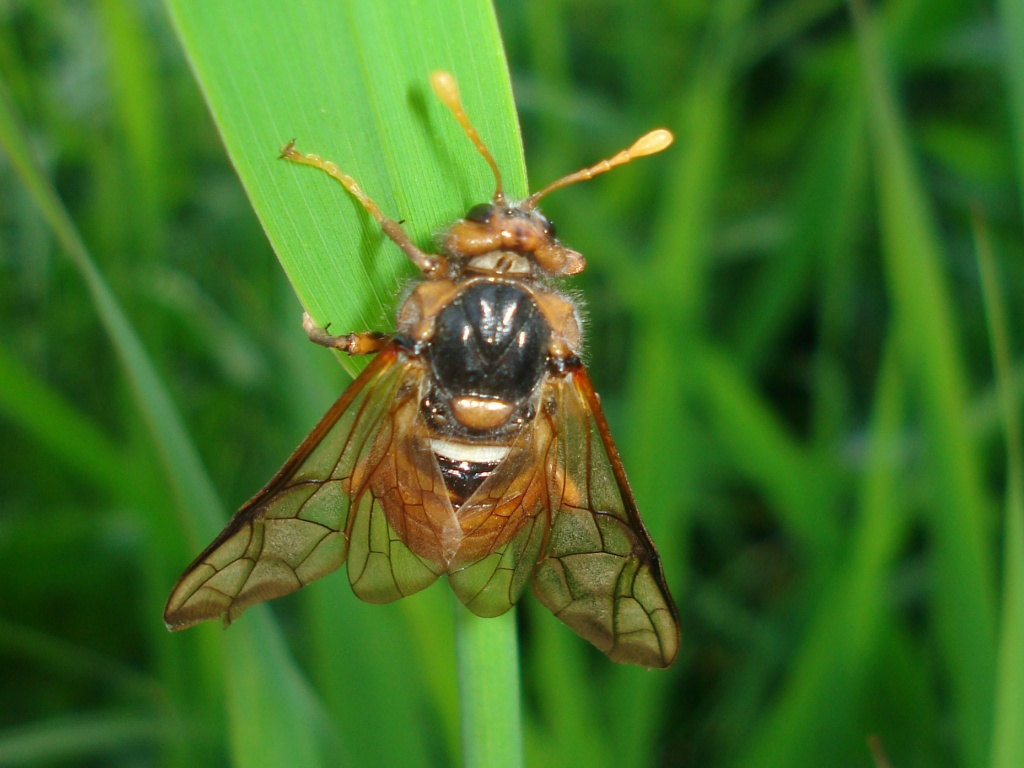

Scientific classification
- Domain: Eukaryota
- Kingdom: Animalia
- Phylum: Arthropoda
- Class: Insecta
- Order: Hymenoptera
- Suborder: Symphyta
- Family: Cimbicidae
- Genus: Cimbex
- Species: C. connatus

Binomial name
- Cimbex connatus (Schrank, 1776)

= Cimbex connatus =

Species of sawfly

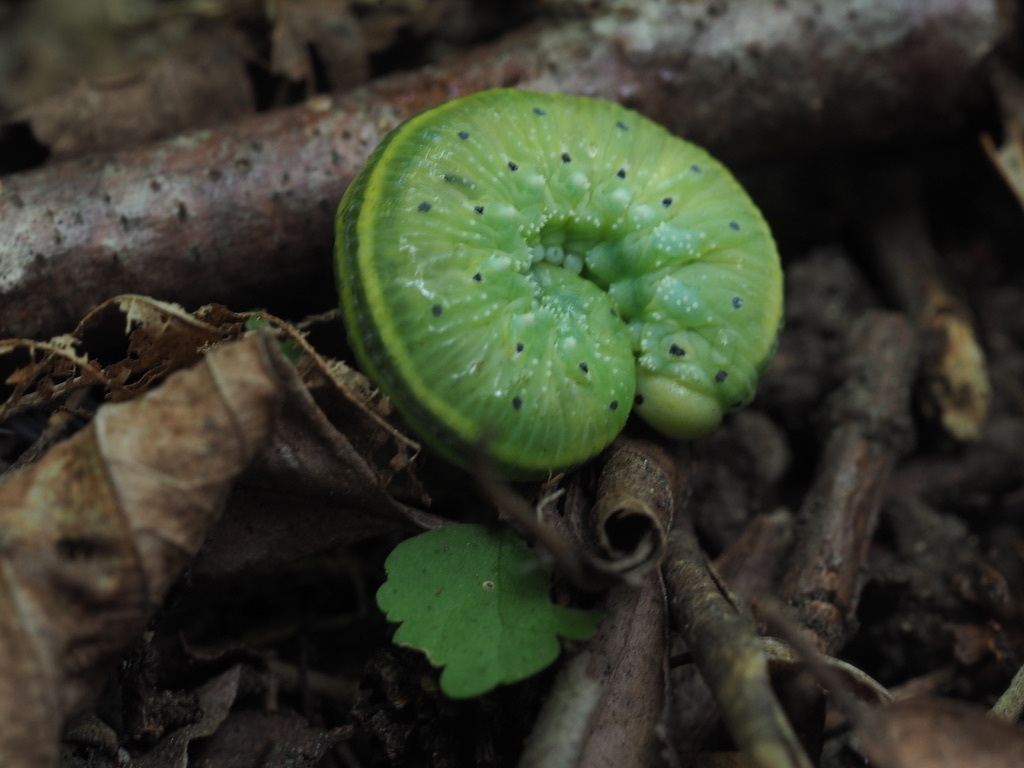
The larvae of the C. connatus feed on species of the genus Alnus

Cimbex connatus, also known by its common name large alder sawfly is a species from the genus Cimbex. The species was originally described by Franz von Paula Schrank in 1776.

== Description ==
The larvae of the C. connatus feed on species of the genus Alder.
