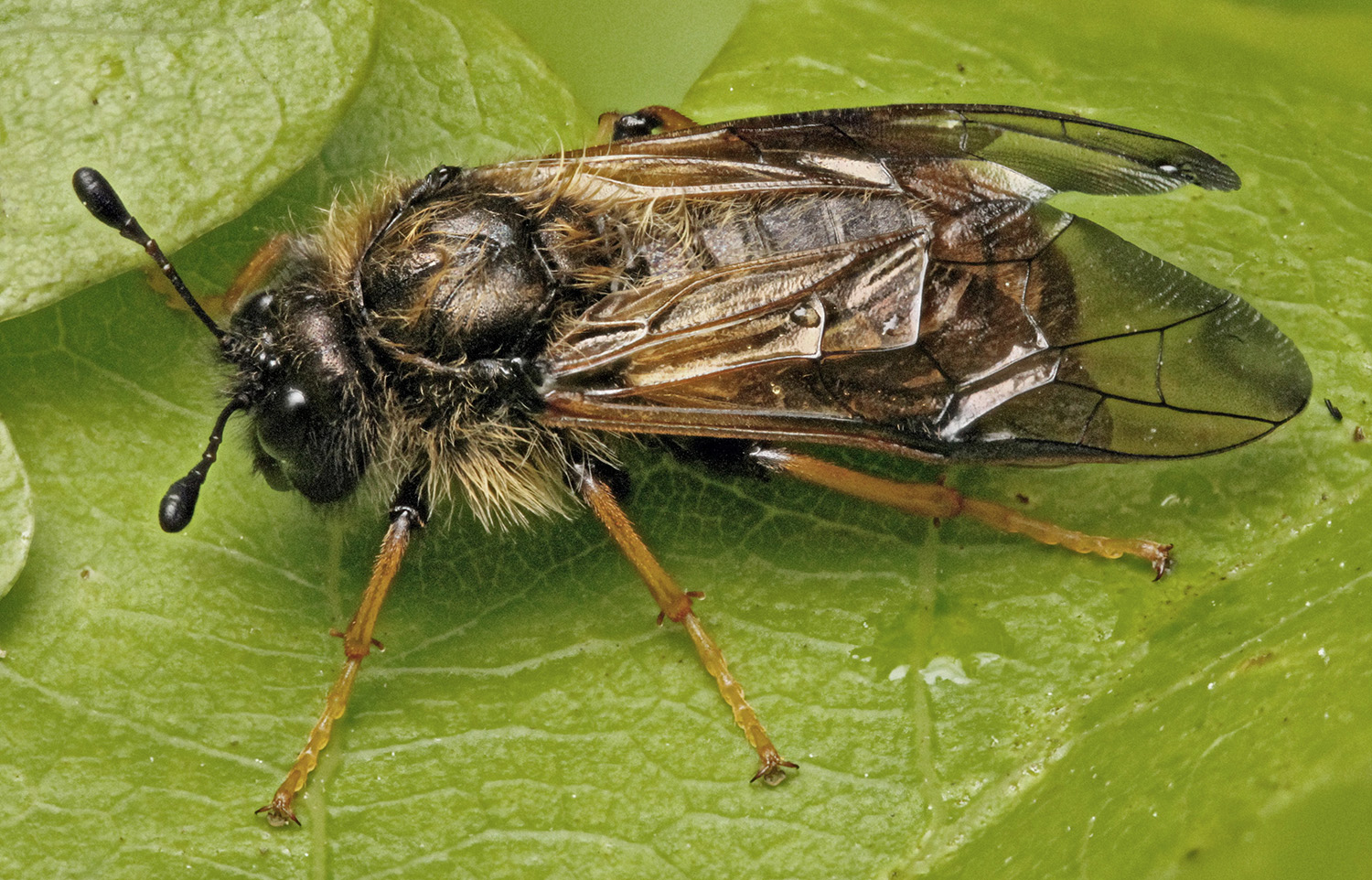
- Trichiosoma lucorum Trawscoed, North Wales

Scientific classification
- Kingdom: Animalia
- Phylum: Arthropoda
- Clade: Pancrustacea
- Class: Insecta
- Order: Hymenoptera
- Suborder: Symphyta
- Family: Cimbicidae
- Genus: Trichiosoma
- Species: T. lucorum

Binomial name
- Trichiosoma lucorum (Linnaeus, 1758)

= Trichiosoma lucorum =

Species of sawfly

Trichiosoma lucorum is a Palearctic species of sawfly. Larvae feed on Betula pubescens.
