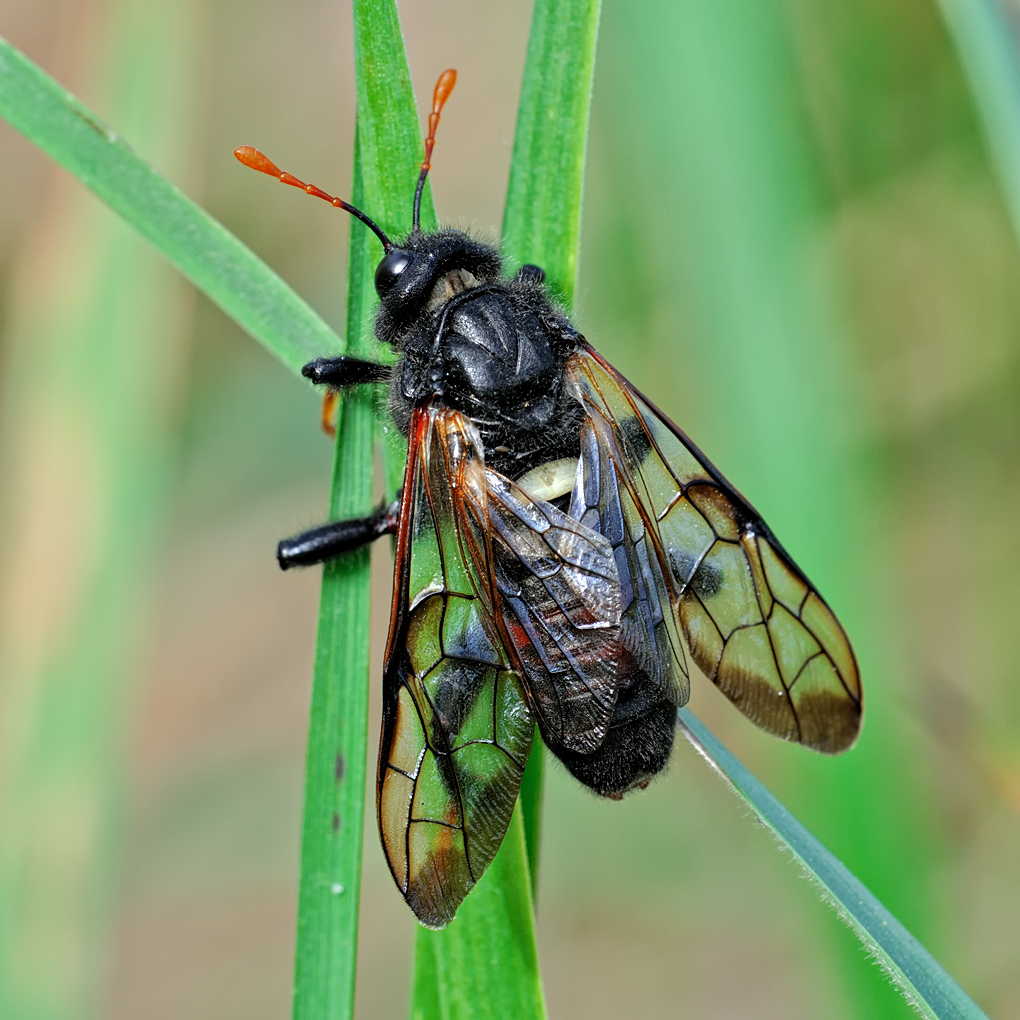
- Adult Cimbex femoratus
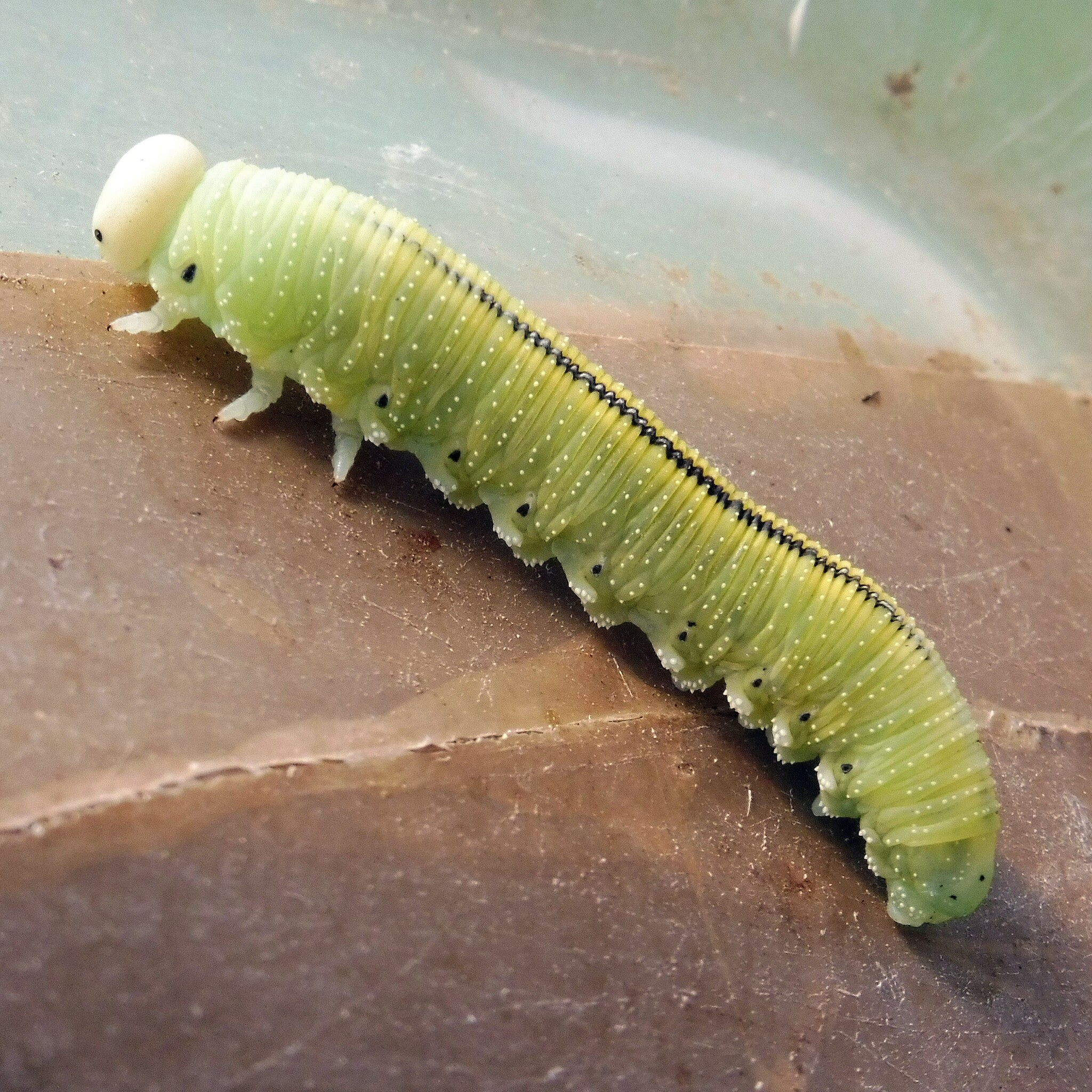
- Cimbex cf. femoratus. Larva

Scientific classification
- Kingdom: Animalia
- Phylum: Arthropoda
- Clade: Pancrustacea
- Class: Insecta
- Order: Hymenoptera
- Suborder: Symphyta
- Family: Cimbicidae
- Genus: Cimbex
- Species: C. femoratus

Binomial name
- Cimbex femoratus (Linnaeus, 1758)

Synonyms
- Cimbex betulae Zaddach, 1863; Cimbex betulae var. feminae flavo-maculata Zaddach, 1863; Cimbex betulae var. flavomaculata Zaddach, 1863; Cimbex betulae var. nigra Zaddach, 1863; Cimbex betulae var. pulla Zaddach, 1863; Cimbex biguetina Lepeletier, 1833; Cimbex europaea Leach, 1817; Cimbex fagi Konow, 1897; Cimbex femorata ab. flavitegula Stroganova, 1973; Cimbex femorata ab. fuscescens Stroganova, 1973

= Cimbex femoratus =

Species of sawfly

Cimbex femoratus, the birch sawfly, is a species of sawfly in the family Cimbicidae.

== Varieties ==
- Cimbex femoratus var. griffinii Leach, 1817
- Cimbex femoratus var. pallens Lepeletier, 1823
- Cimbex femoratus var. silvarum Fabricius, 1793
- Cimbex femoratus var. varians Leach, 1817

== Description ==
Cimbex femoratus can reach a length of 17–23 millimetres (0.67–0.91 in). The head is large, with large and strong mandibles. Wings are smoky brown with brown margins. The thorax is shiny black. The shiny black abdomen shows a whitish band and a large red-brown band, especially in males. The antennae are black at the base and yellow-orange at the tip. Even the last leg segments are yellowish. The adults fly in May to August.

Larvae are pale bluish-green, about 45 mm long and they look very similar to caterpillars. On the back they usually have a dark, narrow bluish longitudinal stripe. They can be found between June and September and feed exclusively on leaves of birch (Betula sp.)

== Distribution ==
They are widespread throughout Europe and Siberia. Though it can also be found in Canada.

== Habitat ==
These sawflies prefer areas where birch trees can be found.
