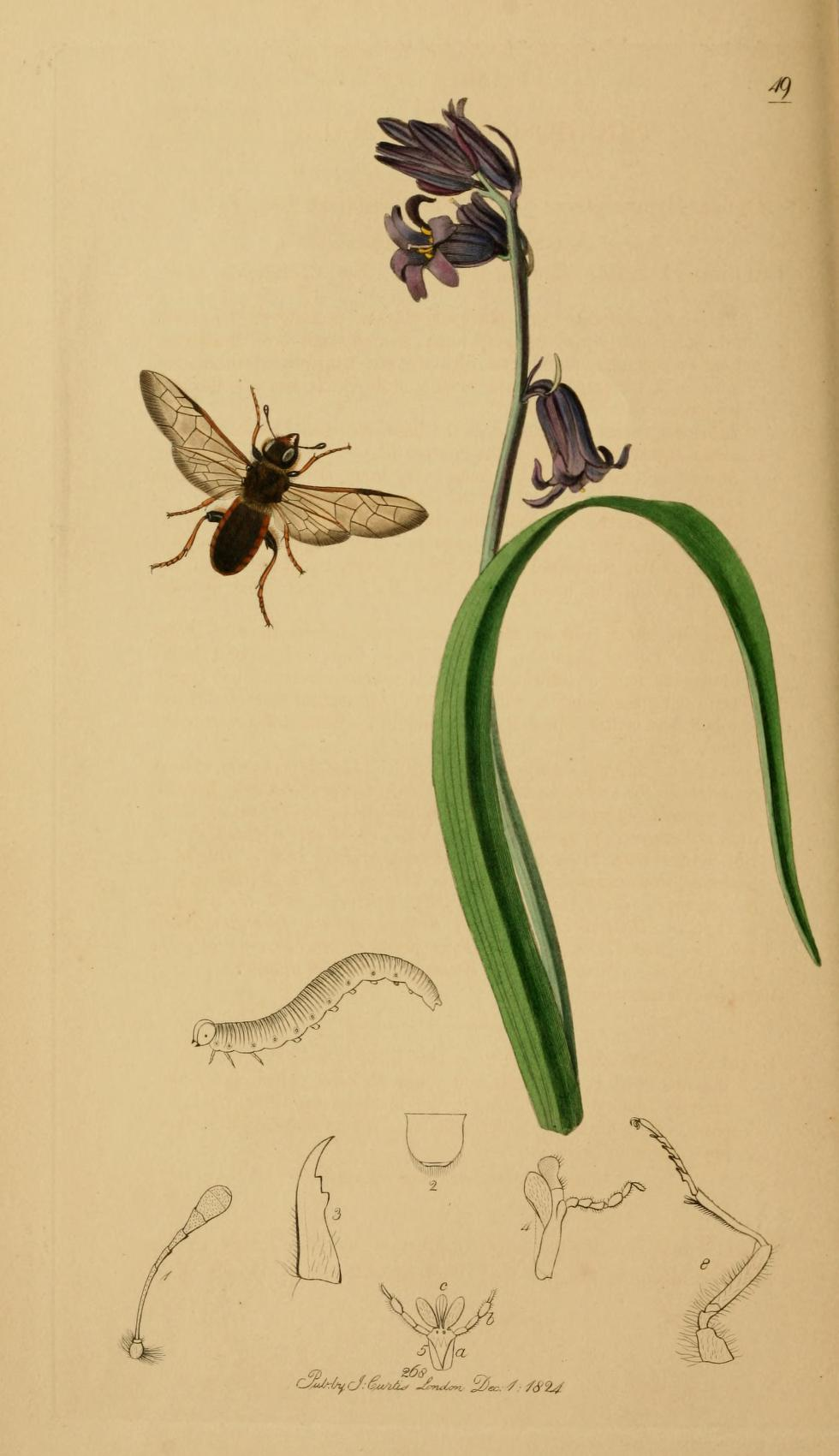
- Trichiosoma vitellina depicted in Britishentomology

Scientific classification
- Kingdom: Animalia
- Phylum: Arthropoda
- Clade: Pancrustacea
- Class: Insecta
- Order: Hymenoptera
- Suborder: Symphyta
- Family: Cimbicidae
- Genus: Trichiosoma
- Species: T. vitellina

Binomial name
- Trichiosoma vitellina (Linnaeus, 1761)

= Trichiosoma vitellina =

Species of sawfly

Trichiosoma vitellina is a Palearctic species of sawfly.
