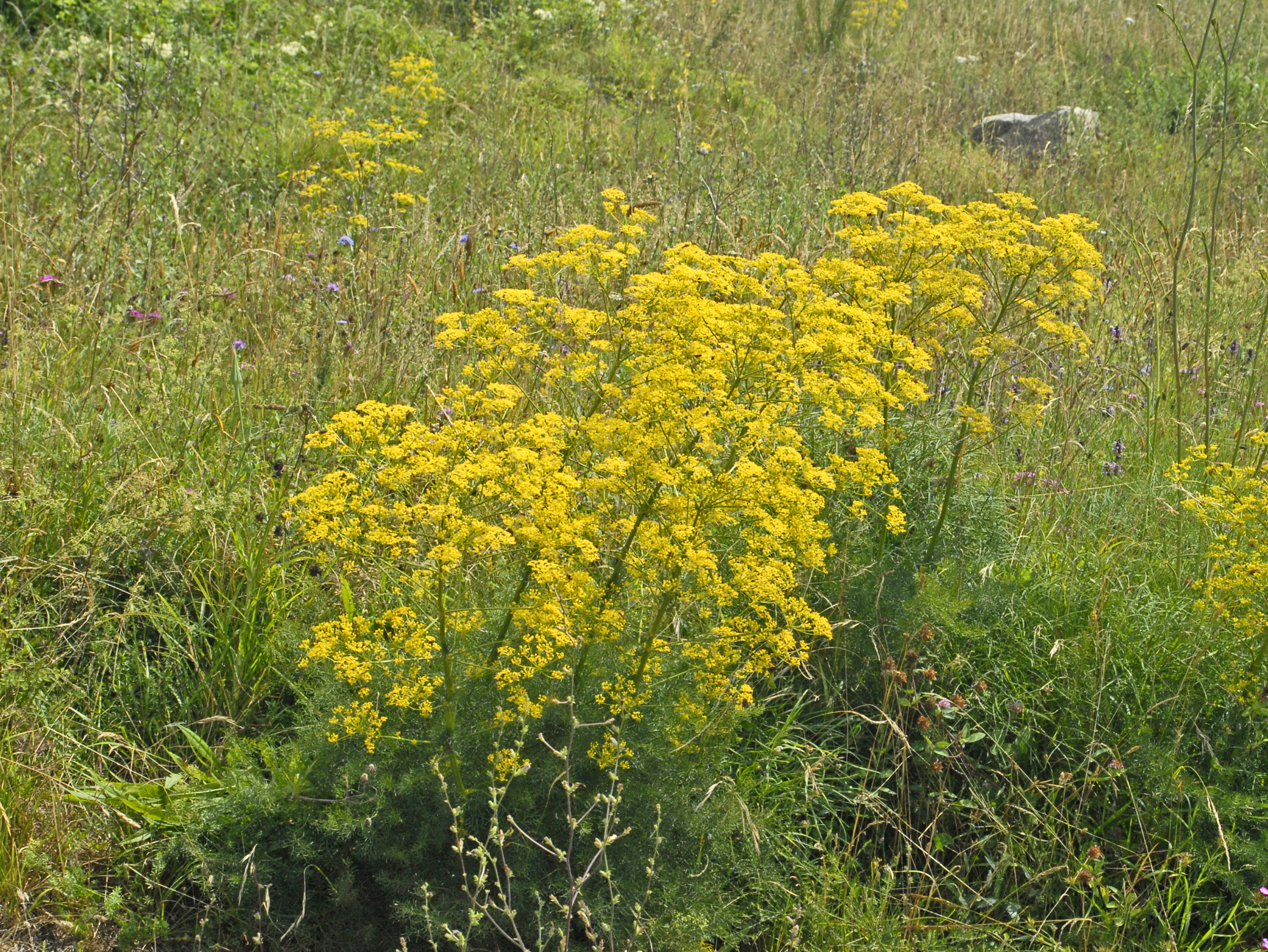
- Ferulago galbanifera

Scientific classification
- Kingdom: Plantae
- Clade: Tracheophytes
- Clade: Angiosperms
- Clade: Eudicots
- Clade: Asterids
- Order: Apiales
- Family: Apiaceae
- Subfamily: Apioideae
- Genus: Ferulago; W.D.J.Koch

Synonyms
- Hammatocaulis Tausch; Lophosciadium DC.; Uloptera Fenzl

= Ferulago =

Genus of flowering plants

Ferulago is a genus of flowering plants in the family Apiaceae.

== Species ==
As of December 2022, Plants of the World Online accepted the following species:

- Ferulago abbreviata C.C.Towns.
- Ferulago akpulatii Akalın & Gürdal
- Ferulago angulata (Schltdl.) Boiss.
- Ferulago antiochia Saya & Miski
- Ferulago armena (DC.) Bernardi
- Ferulago asparagifolia Boiss.
- Ferulago aucheri Boiss.
- Ferulago bernardii Tomk. & Pimenov
- Ferulago biumbellata Pomel
- Ferulago blancheana Post ex Boiss.
- Ferulago brachyloba Boiss. & Reut.
- Ferulago bracteata Boiss. & Hausskn.
- Ferulago carduchorum Boiss. & Hausskn.
- Ferulago cassia Boiss.
- Ferulago contracta Boiss. & Hausskn.
- Ferulago galbanifera (Mill.) W.D.J.Koch
- Ferulago glareosa Kandemir & Hedge
- Ferulago granatensis Boiss.
- Ferulago humilis Boiss.
- Ferulago idaea Özhatay & Akalin
- Ferulago isaurica Peşmen
- Ferulago kurdica Post
- Ferulago lutea (Poir.) Grande
- Ferulago macedonica Micevski & E.Mayer
- Ferulago macrocarpa (Fenzl) Boiss.
- Ferulago macrosciadea Boiss. & Balansa
- Ferulago mughlae Peşmen
- Ferulago nodosa (L.) Boiss.
- Ferulago pachyloba (Fenzl) Boiss.
- Ferulago phialocarpa Rech.f. & Riedl
- Ferulago platycarpa Boiss. & Balansa
- Ferulago sandrasica Peşmen & Quézel
- Ferulago sartorii Boiss.
- Ferulago scabra Pomel
- Ferulago serpentinica Rech.f.
- Ferulago setifolia K.Koch
- Ferulago silaifolia (Boiss.) Boiss.
- Ferulago stellata Boiss.
- Ferulago subvelutina Rech.f.
- Ferulago sylvatica (Besser) Rchb.
- Ferulago syriaca Boiss.
- Ferulago ternatifolia Solanas, M.B.Crespo & García-Martín
- Ferulago thirkeana Boiss.
- Ferulago thyrsiflora (Sm.) W.D.J.Koch
- Ferulago trachycarpa Boiss.
- Ferulago trojana Akalın & Pimenov
- Ferulago vesceritensis Coss. & Durieu ex Batt.
- Ferulago westii (Post) Pimenov & Kljuykov
