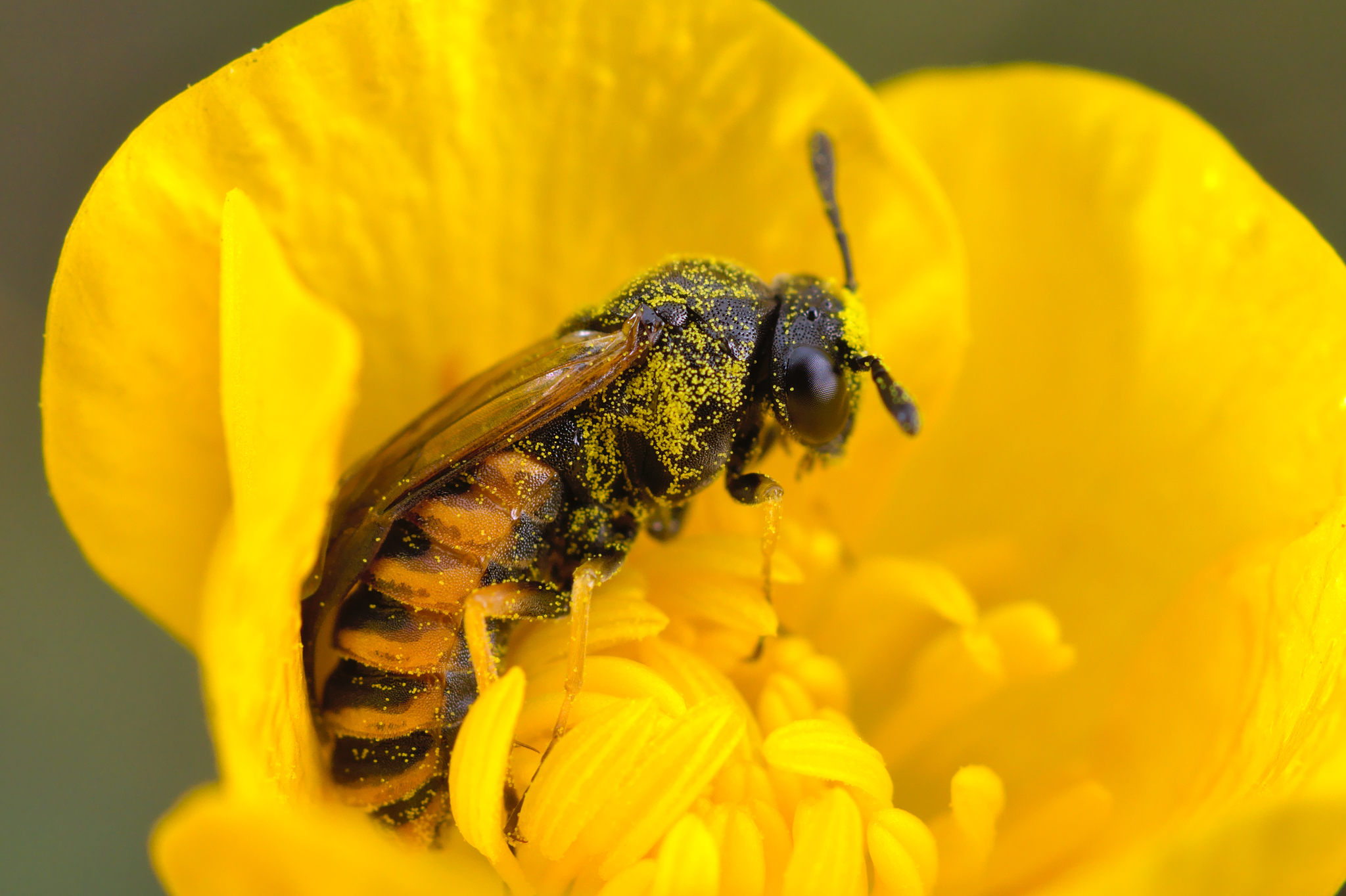
- Corynis crassicornis

Scientific classification
- Kingdom: Animalia
- Phylum: Arthropoda
- Class: Insecta
- Order: Hymenoptera
- Suborder: Symphyta
- Family: Cimbicidae
- Genus: Corynis; Thunberg, 1789

= Corynis =

Genus of sawflies

Corynis is a genus of sawflies belonging to the family Cimbicidae.

The species of this genus are found in Europe and North Africa.

Species:

- Corynis obscura (Fabricius, 1775)
