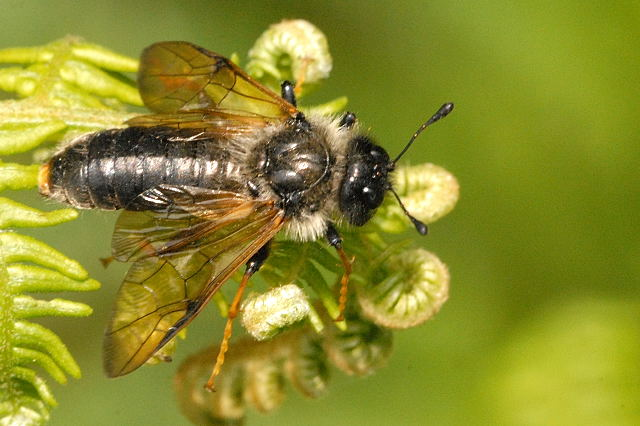
- Trichiosoma lucorum

Scientific classification
- Kingdom: Animalia
- Phylum: Arthropoda
- Clade: Pancrustacea
- Class: Insecta
- Order: Hymenoptera
- Suborder: Symphyta
- Family: Cimbicidae
- Subfamily: Cimbicinae
- Genus: Trichiosoma; Leach, 1817

= Trichiosoma =

Genus of sawflies

Trichiosoma is a genus of cimbicid sawflies in the family Cimbicidae. There are more than 30 described species in Trichiosoma.

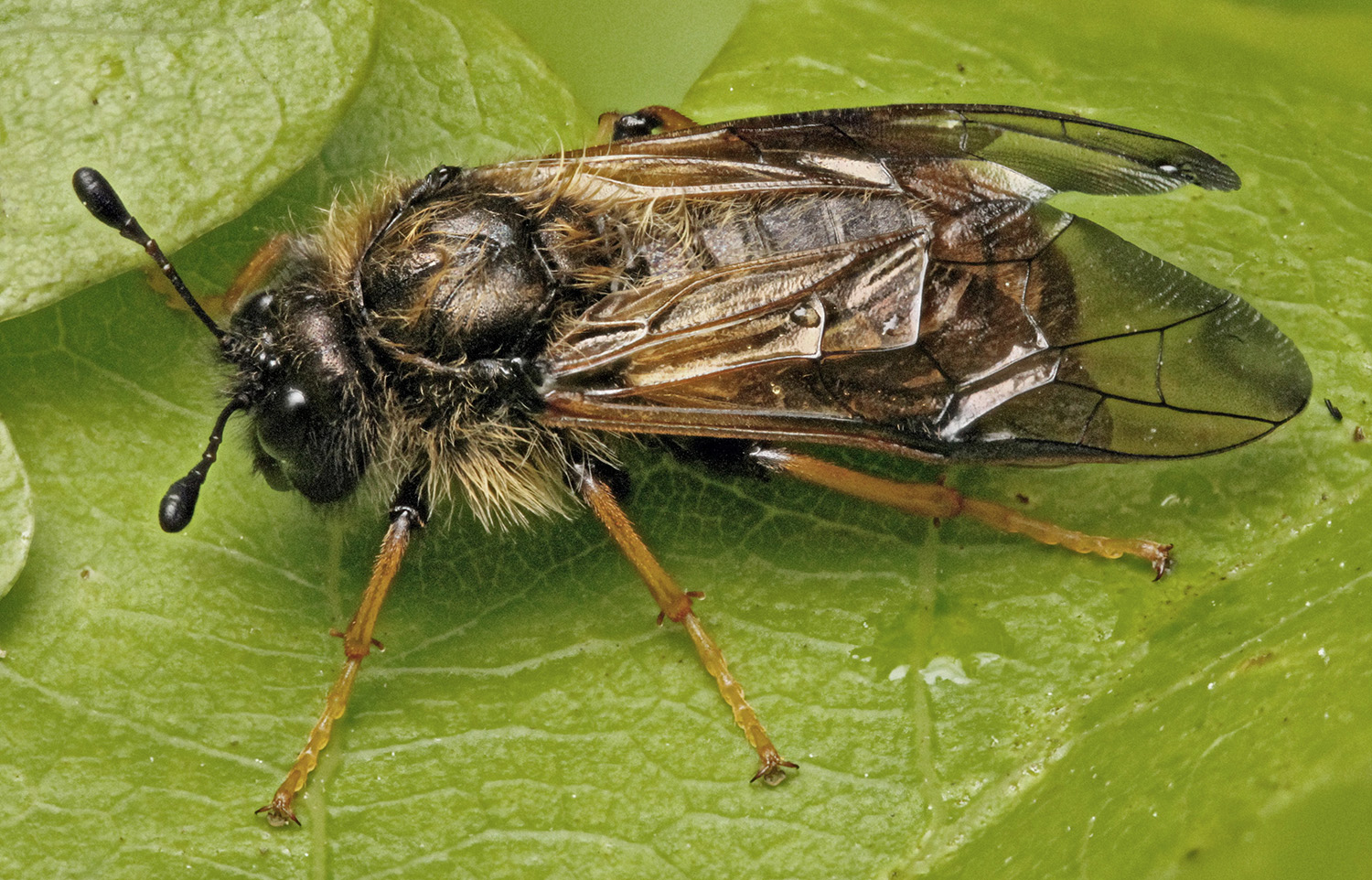
Trichiosoma lucorum

== Species ==
These 22 species belong to the genus Trichiosoma:

- Trichiosoma aenescens Gussakovskij, 1947
- Trichiosoma crassum Kirby, 1882
- Trichiosoma himalayanum Malaise, 1939
- Trichiosoma kontuniemii Saarinen, 1950
- Trichiosoma laterale Leach, 1817
- Trichiosoma latreillii Leach, 1817
- Trichiosoma lucorum (Linnaeus, 1758)
- Trichiosoma malaisei Saarinen, 1950
- Trichiosoma nanae Vikberg & Viitasaari, 1991
- Trichiosoma nigricoma Konow, 1906
- Trichiosoma pusillum Leach, 1817
- Trichiosoma sachalinense Matsumura, 1911
- Trichiosoma scalesii Leach, 1817
- Trichiosoma sericeum Konow, 1903
- Trichiosoma sibiricum Gussakovskij, 1947
- Trichiosoma sorbi Hartig, 1840
- Trichiosoma sylvaticum Leach, 1817
- Trichiosoma tibiale Stephens, 1835
- Trichiosoma triangulum Kirby, 1837 (giant birch sawfly)
- Trichiosoma villosum (Motschulsky, 1860)
- Trichiosoma vitellina (Linnaeus, 1760)
- Trichiosoma vitellinae (Linné, 1761)
