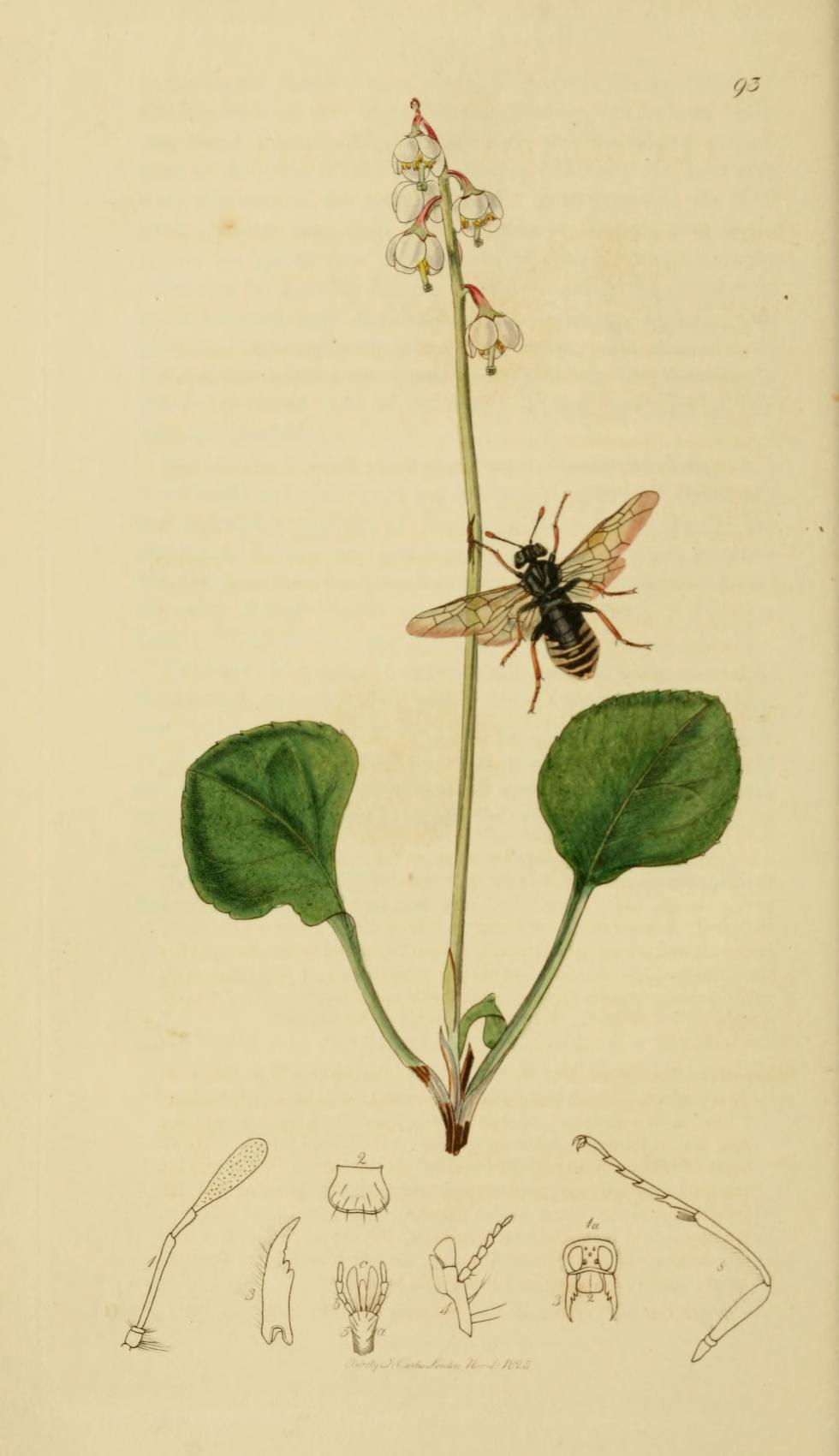

Scientific classification
- Domain: Eukaryota
- Kingdom: Animalia
- Phylum: Arthropoda
- Class: Insecta
- Order: Hymenoptera
- Suborder: Symphyta
- Family: Cimbicidae
- Genus: Pseudoclavellaria; Schulz, 1906

= Pseudoclavellaria =

Genus of insects

Pseudoclavellaria is a genus of insects belonging to the family Cimbicidae.

The species of this genus are found in Europe and Russia.

Species:

- Clavellaria autochthna (Zhang, 1989)
- Clavellaria longiclava (Zhang, 1989)
