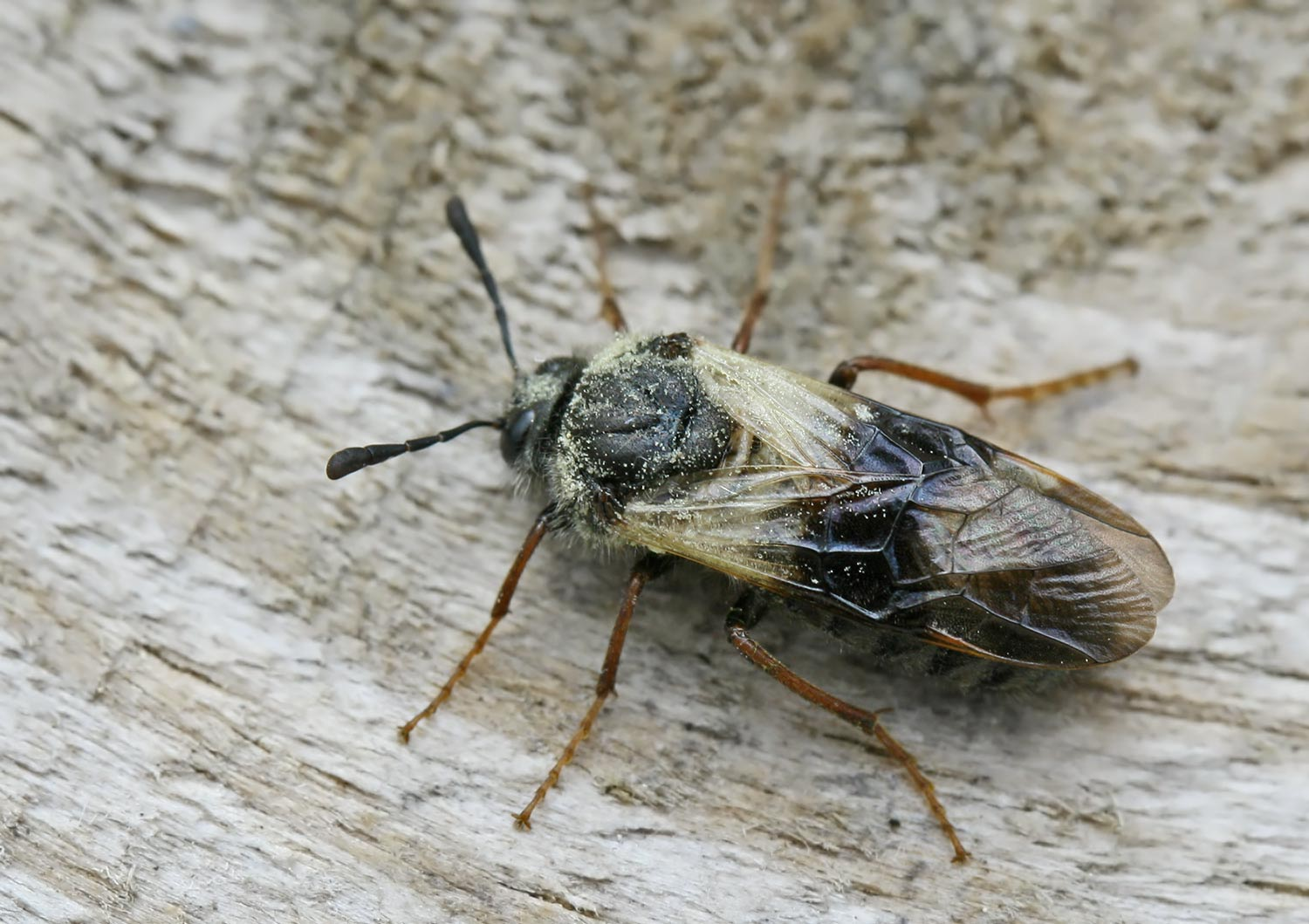
- Abia fasciata

Scientific classification
- Kingdom: Animalia
- Phylum: Arthropoda
- Class: Insecta
- Order: Hymenoptera
- Suborder: Symphyta
- Family: Cimbicidae
- Subfamily: Abiinae
- Genus: Abia; Leach, 1817

Synonyms
- Aenoabia Kangas, 1946; Albia Tischbein, 1846; Auroabia Kangas, 1946; Parabia Semenov, 1891; Zaraea Leach, 1817

= Abia (sawfly) =

Genus of sawflies

Abia is a genus of sawflies belonging to the family Cimbicidae, including several stout sawflies commonly encountered in Europe. Several species in the genus were formerly classified under the genus Zaraea, but this name is now treated as a synonym.

== Species ==
These species belong to the genus Abia:

- Abia aenea (Klug, 1820) (Europe)
- Abia akebiae (Takeuchi, 1931)
- Abia americana (North America)
- Abia antennata Kangas, 1946 (Europe)
- Abia aurata (Takeuchi, 1931)
- Abia aurulenta Sichel, 1856 (Europe)
- Abia berezowskii Semenov, 1896
- Abia brevicornis Leach, 1817 (Europe)
- Abia candens Konow, 1887 (Europe)
- Abia fasciata (Linnaeus, 1758) (Europe and North America)
- Abia formosa Takeuchi, 1927 (temperate Asia)
- Abia fulgens Zaddach, 1863 (Europe)
- Abia hungarica Mocsáry, 1883
- Abia imperialis Körby, 1882 (temperate Asia)
- Abia infernalis Semenov, 1896
- Abia inflata (North America)
- Abia lewisii Cameron, 1887
- Abia lonicerae (Linnaeus, 1758) (Europe and North America)
- Abia maculosa Zhang, 1989
- Abia magna
- Abia marginata Mocsáry, 1909
- Abia metallica Mocsáry, 1909
- Abia mutica Thomson, 1871 (Europe)
- Abia nitens (Linnaeus, 1758) (Europe)
- Abia niui Wei and Deng, 1999
- Abia paurocephala Zhang, 1989
- Abia sericea (Linnaeus, 1767) (Europe)
- Abia triangularis (Takeuchi, 1931)
- Abia vitalisi Turner, 1920
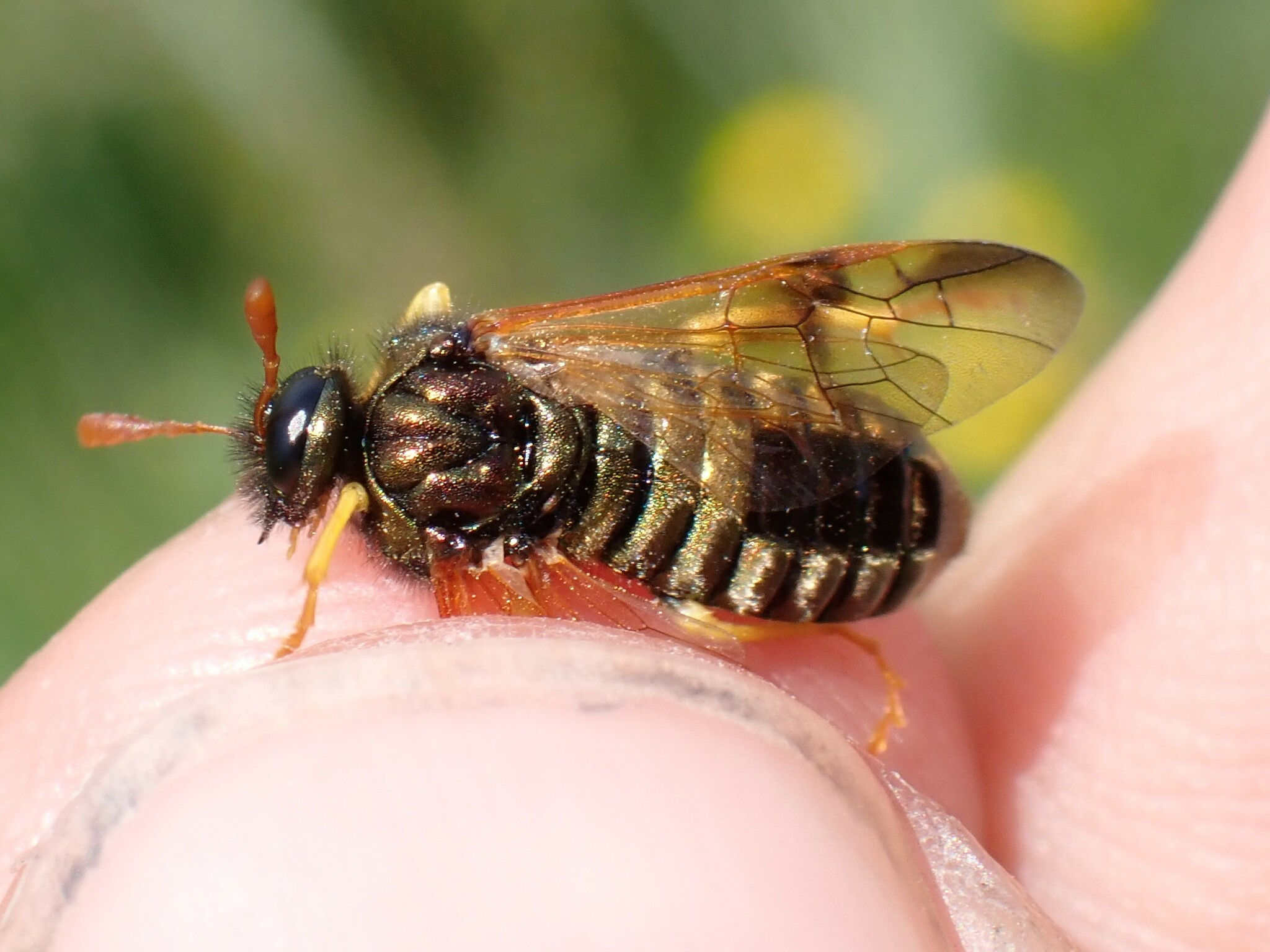
Abia nitens, France

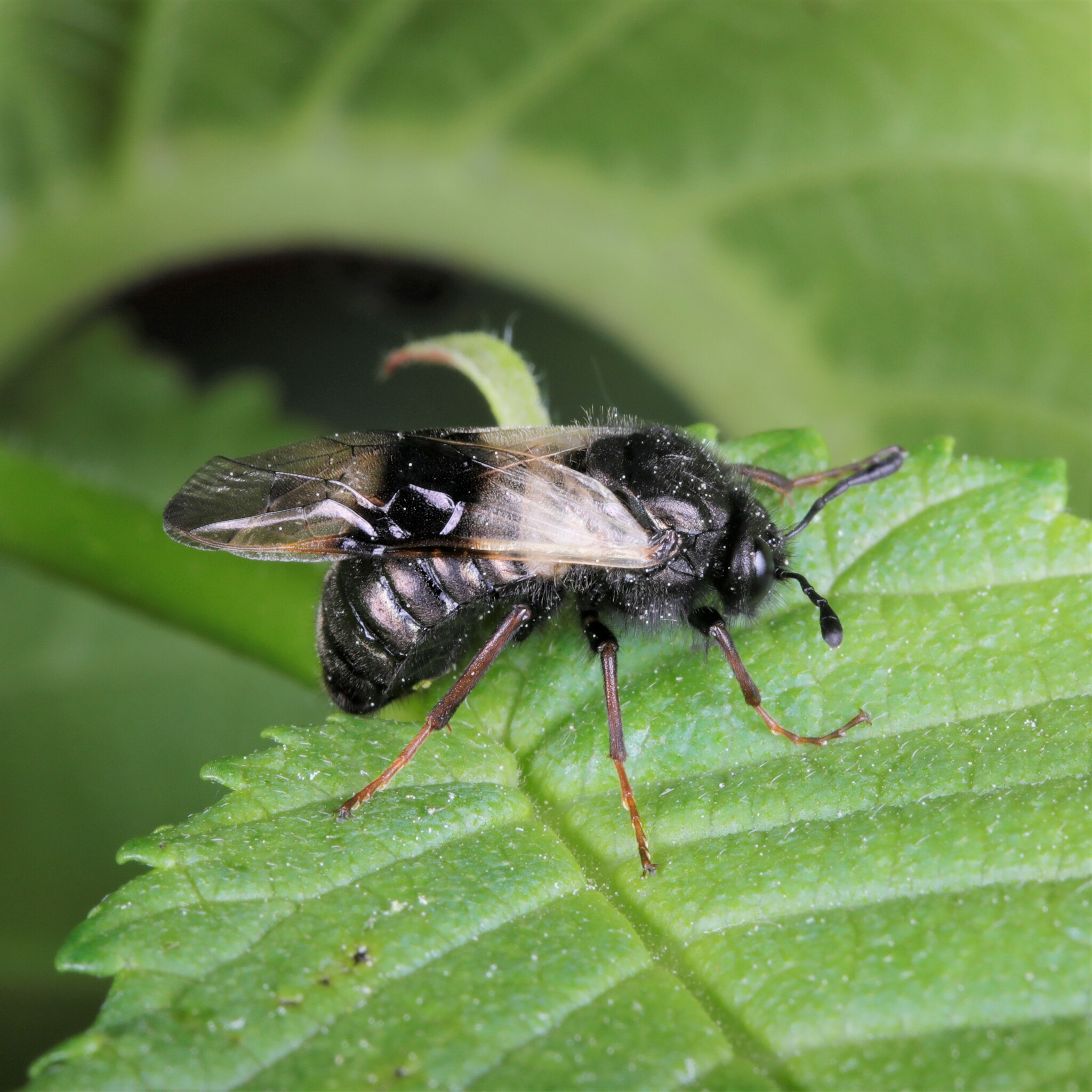
Abia fasciata, Finland

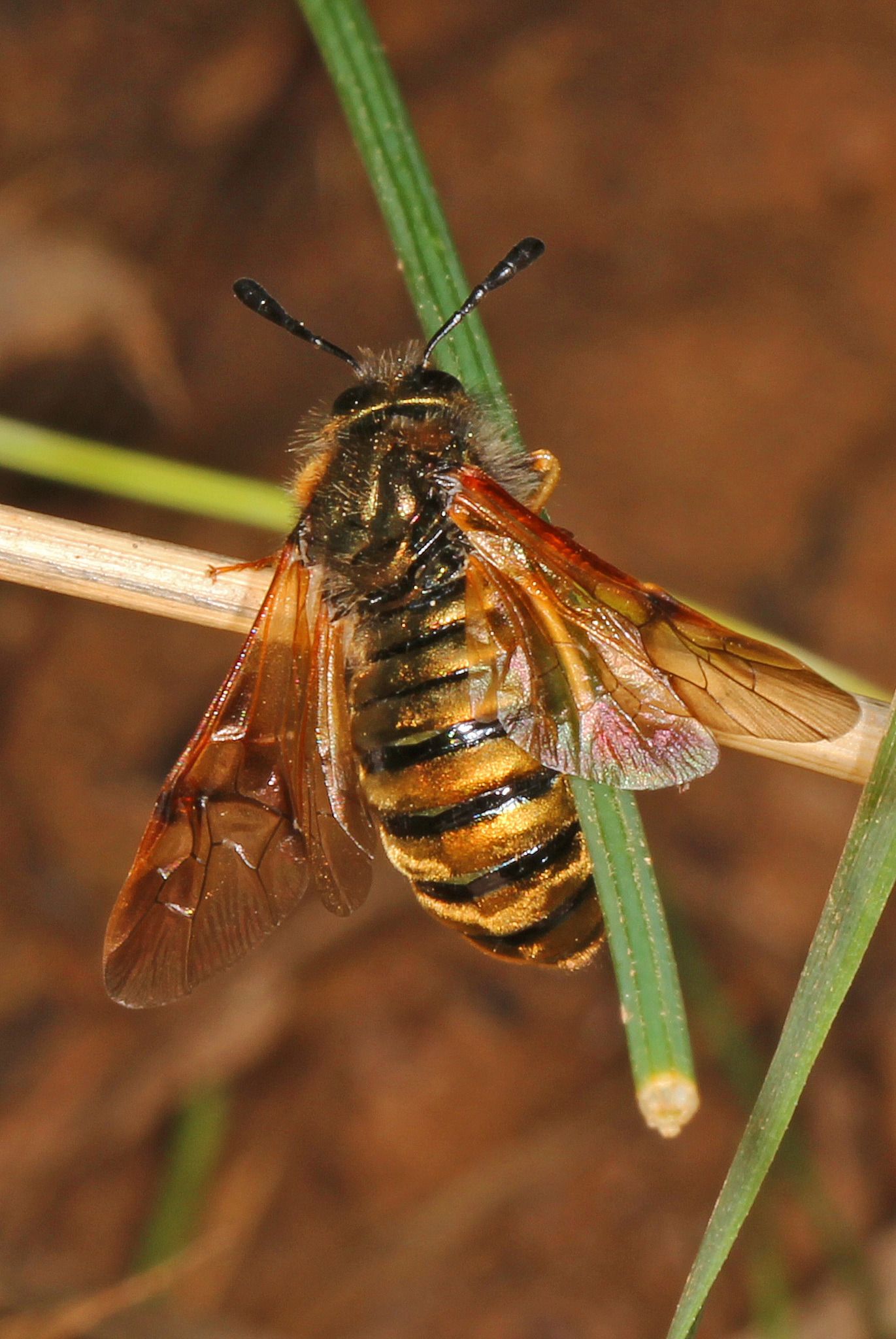
Abia lonicerae, Virginia

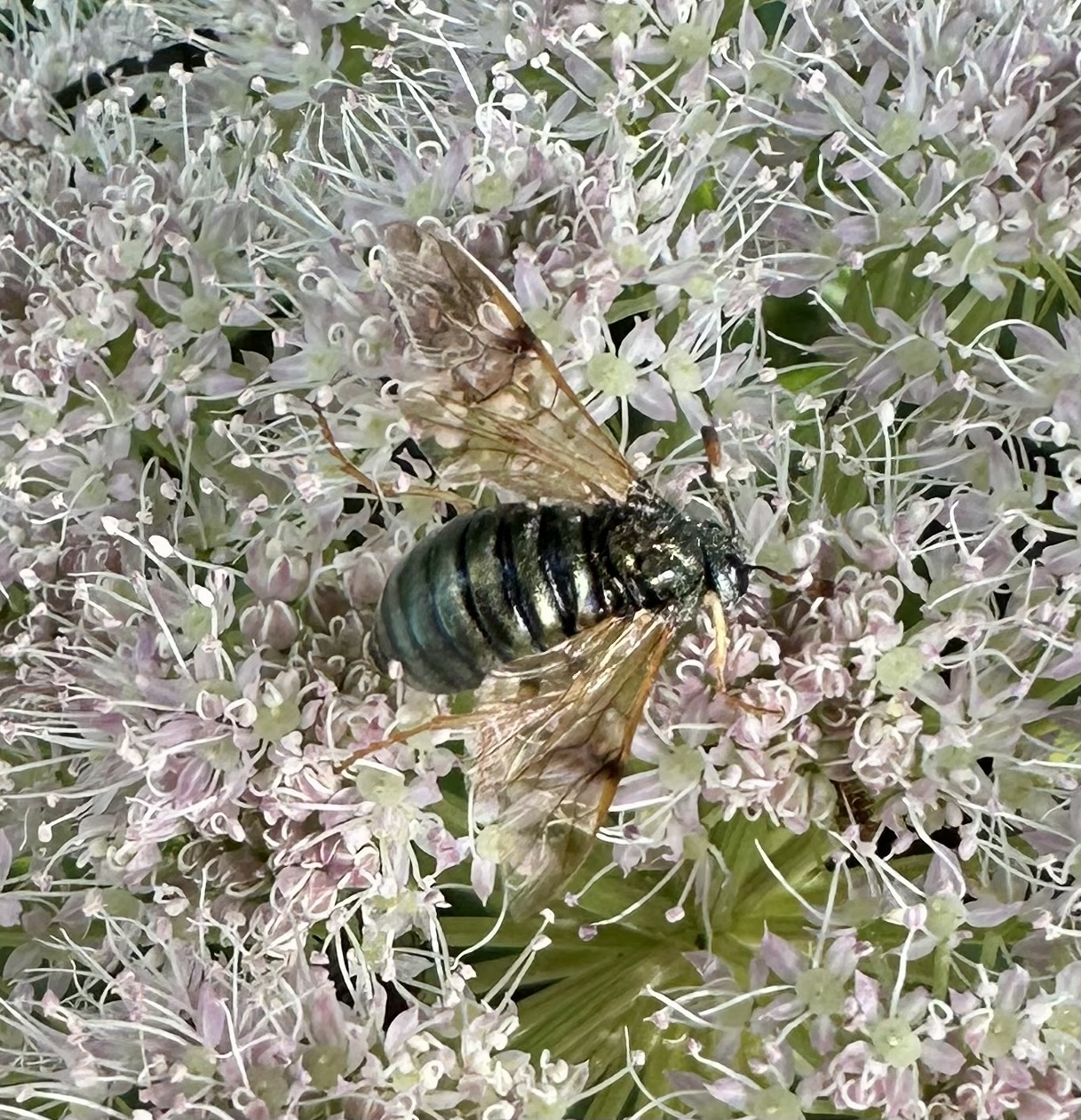
Abia fulgens, Germany

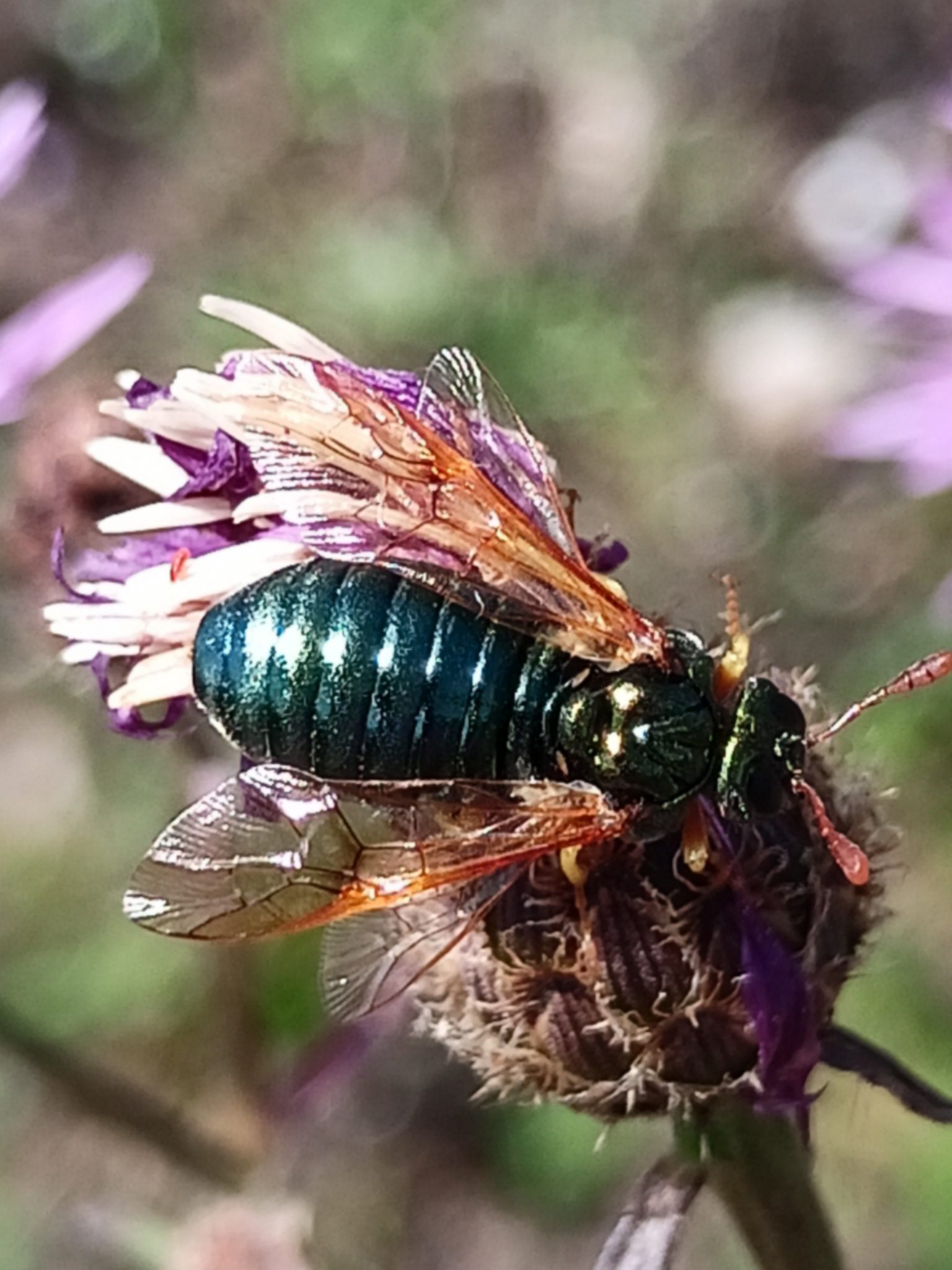
Abia brevicornis, Germany

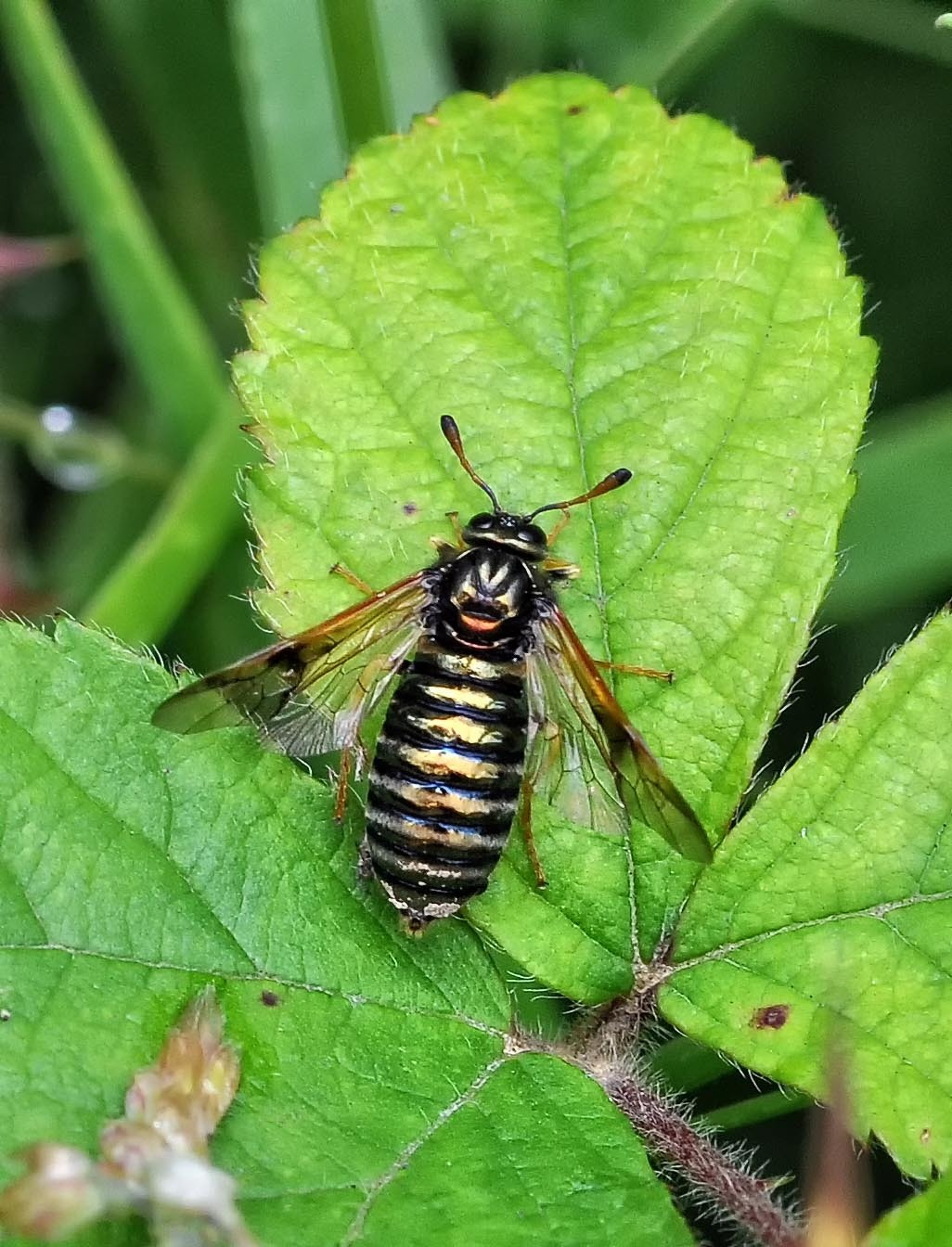
Abia candens, UK

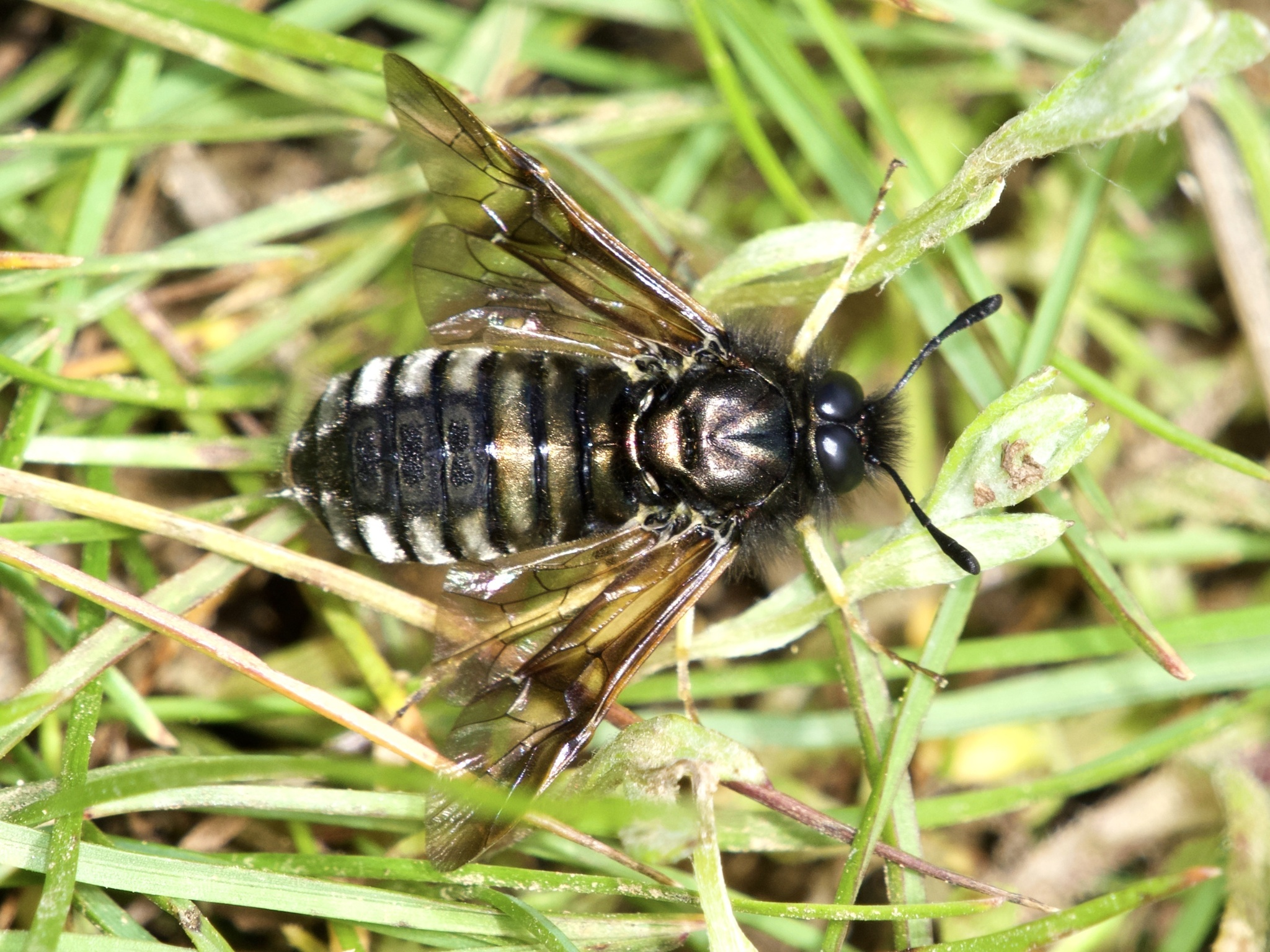
Abia americana, Oregon

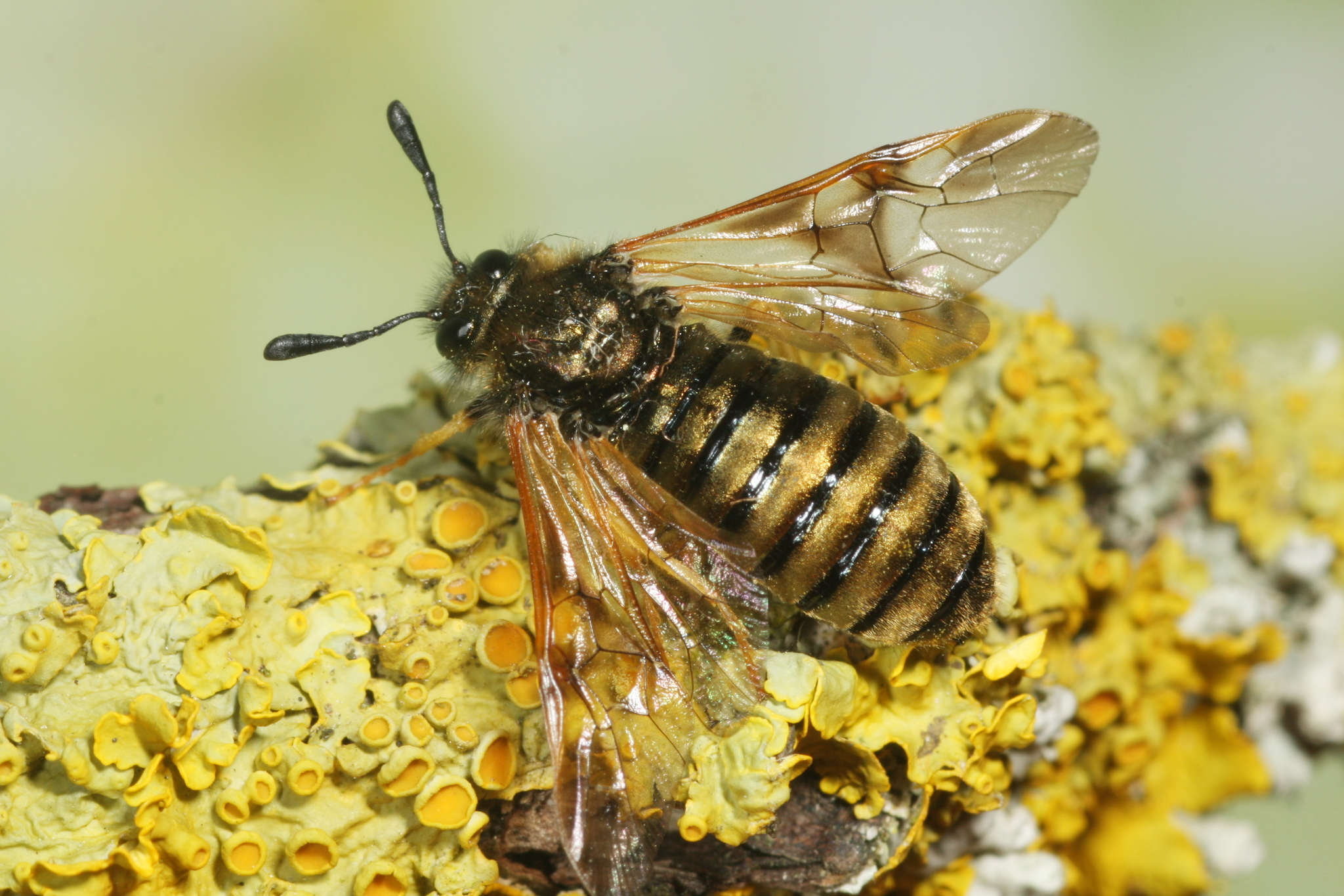
Abia aenea, Germany

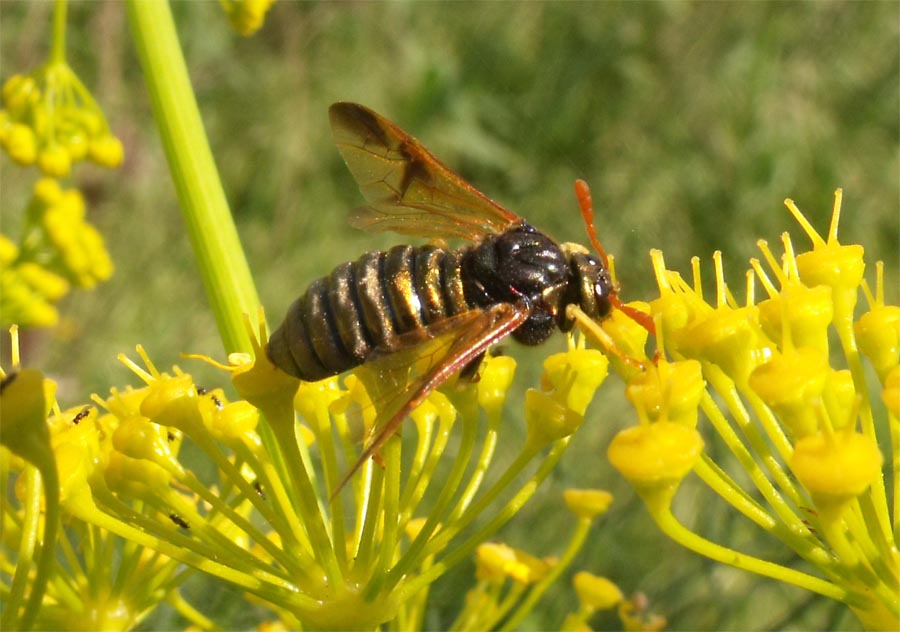
Abia sericea, Italy
