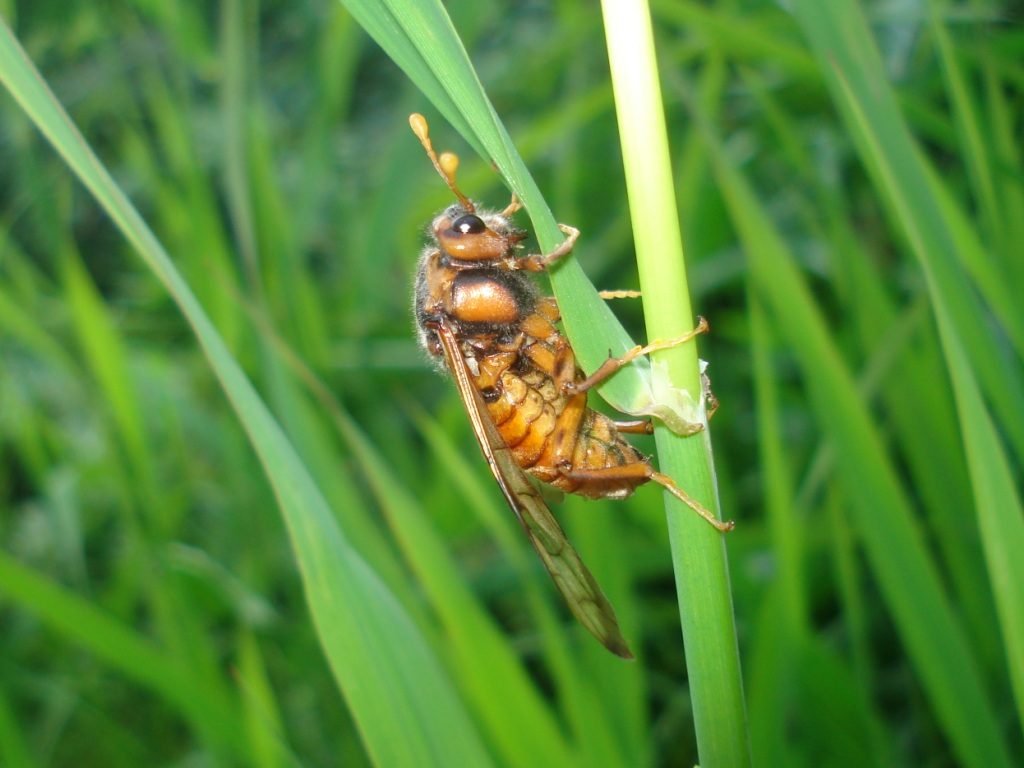
- Cimbex connatus

Scientific classification
- Domain: Eukaryota
- Kingdom: Animalia
- Phylum: Arthropoda
- Class: Insecta
- Order: Hymenoptera
- Suborder: Symphyta
- Family: Cimbicidae
- Genus: Cimbex; Olivier, 1790

Synonyms
- Crabro Geoffroy, 1762 (suppressed); Clavellarius Olivier, 1789 (suppressed); Clavellaria Lamarck, 1801 (suppressed); Palaeocimbex Semenov, 1935; Deuterocimbex Semenov, 1935; Neocimbex Malaise, 1937; Allocimbex Zirngiebl, 1953

= Cimbex =

Cimbex Temporal range: Eocene – Miocene 37.2–Recent Ma

Genus of sawflies

Cimbex is a genus of sawflies in the family Cimbicidae.

== Selected species ==
- Cimbex americanus Leach, 1817 – Elm sawfly
- Cimbex connatus (Schrank, 1776)
- Cimbex fagi Zaddach, 1863
- Cimbex femoratus (Linnaeus, 1758) – Birch sawfly
- Cimbex luteus (Linnaeus, 1761)
- Cimbex pacificus Cresson, 1880
- Cimbex quadrimaculatus (O. F. Müller, 1766)
- Cimbex rubidus Cresson, 1880
- Cimbex semidea Cresson, 1880

== Fossil record ==
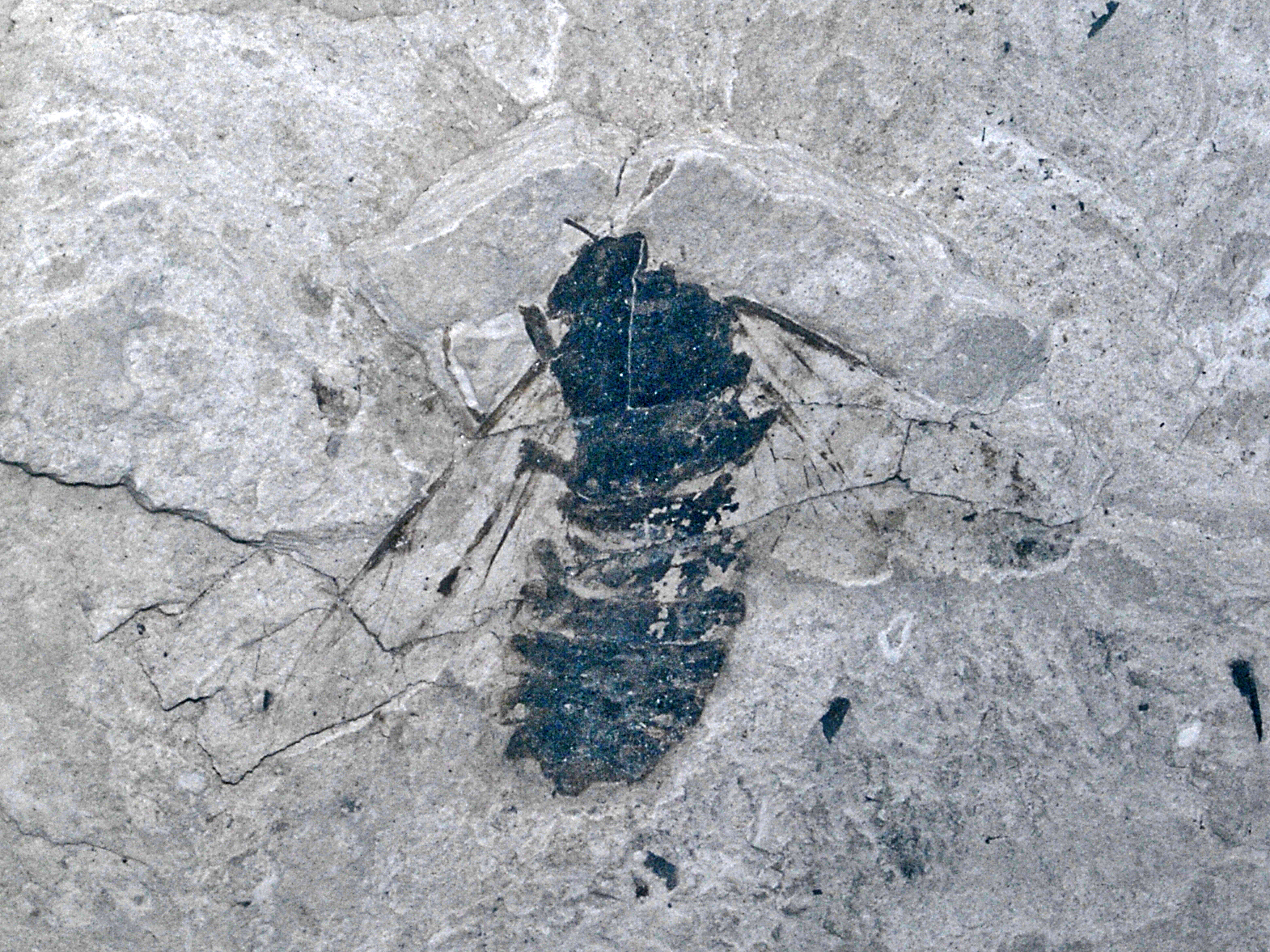
Fossil of Cimbex species

This genus is known in the fossil record from the Eocene to the Miocene (from about 37.2 to recent). Fossils of species within this genus have been found in United States, Japan, and China.
