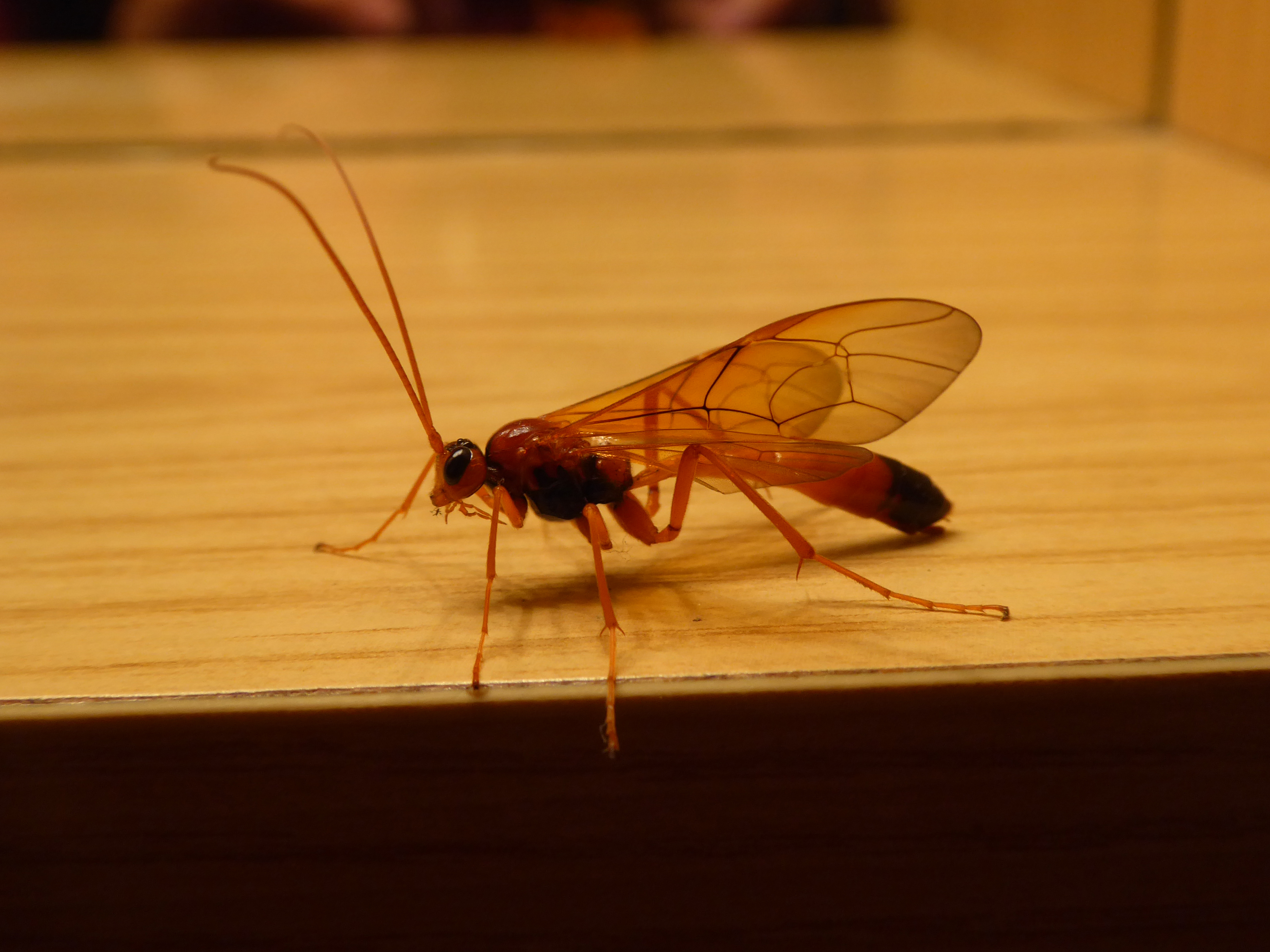

Scientific classification
- Kingdom: Animalia
- Phylum: Arthropoda
- Class: Insecta
- Order: Hymenoptera
- Family: Ichneumonidae
- Genus: Opheltes
- Species: O. glaucopterus

Binomial name
- Opheltes glaucopterus Linnaeus 1758

Synonyms
- Ichneumon glaucopterus

= Opheltes glaucopterus =

Species of wasp

Opheltes glaucopterus is a Ichneumonidae wasp that parasitizes pupae from the sawfly genus Cimbex. It has a Holarctic distribution.
