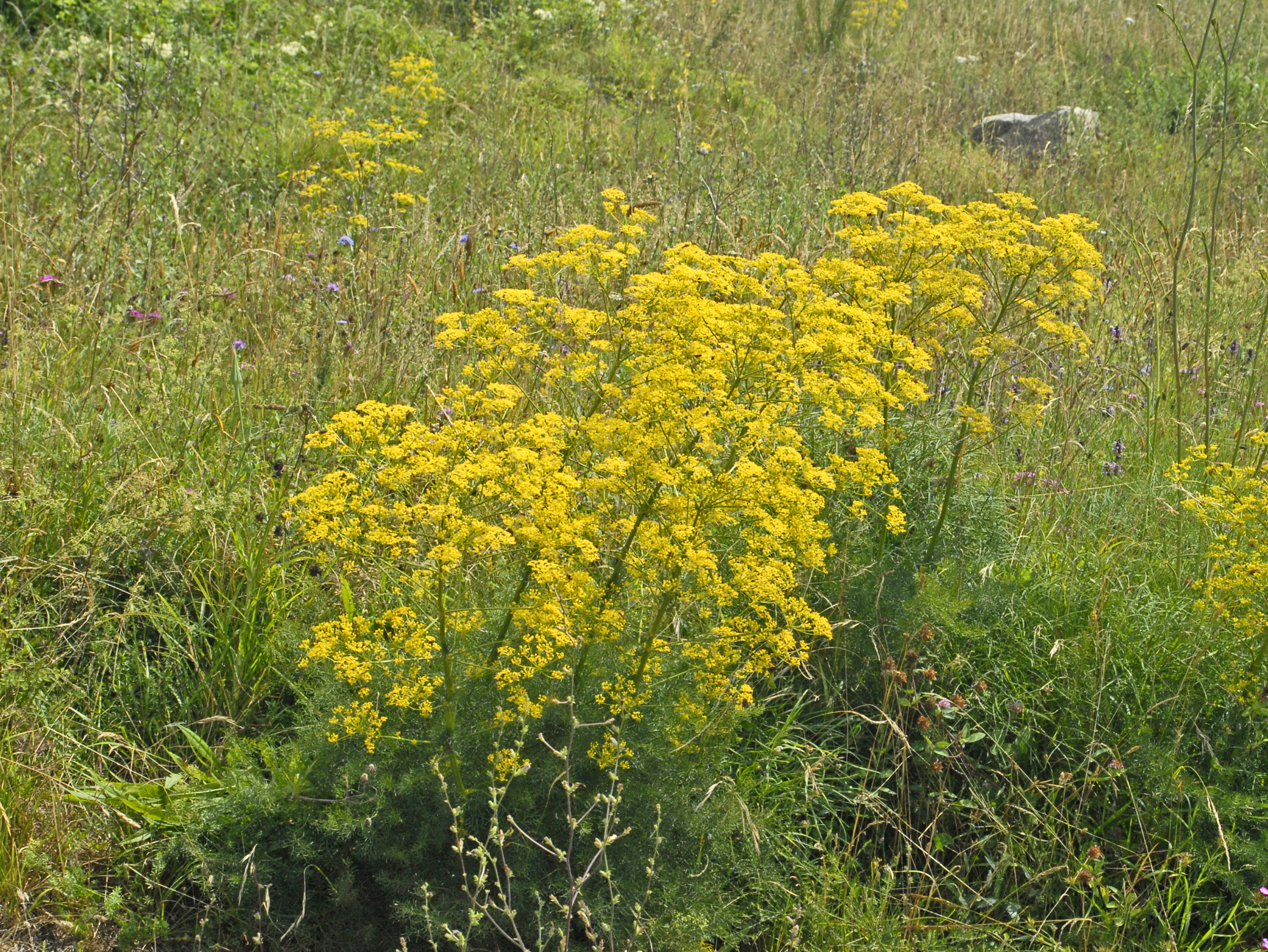

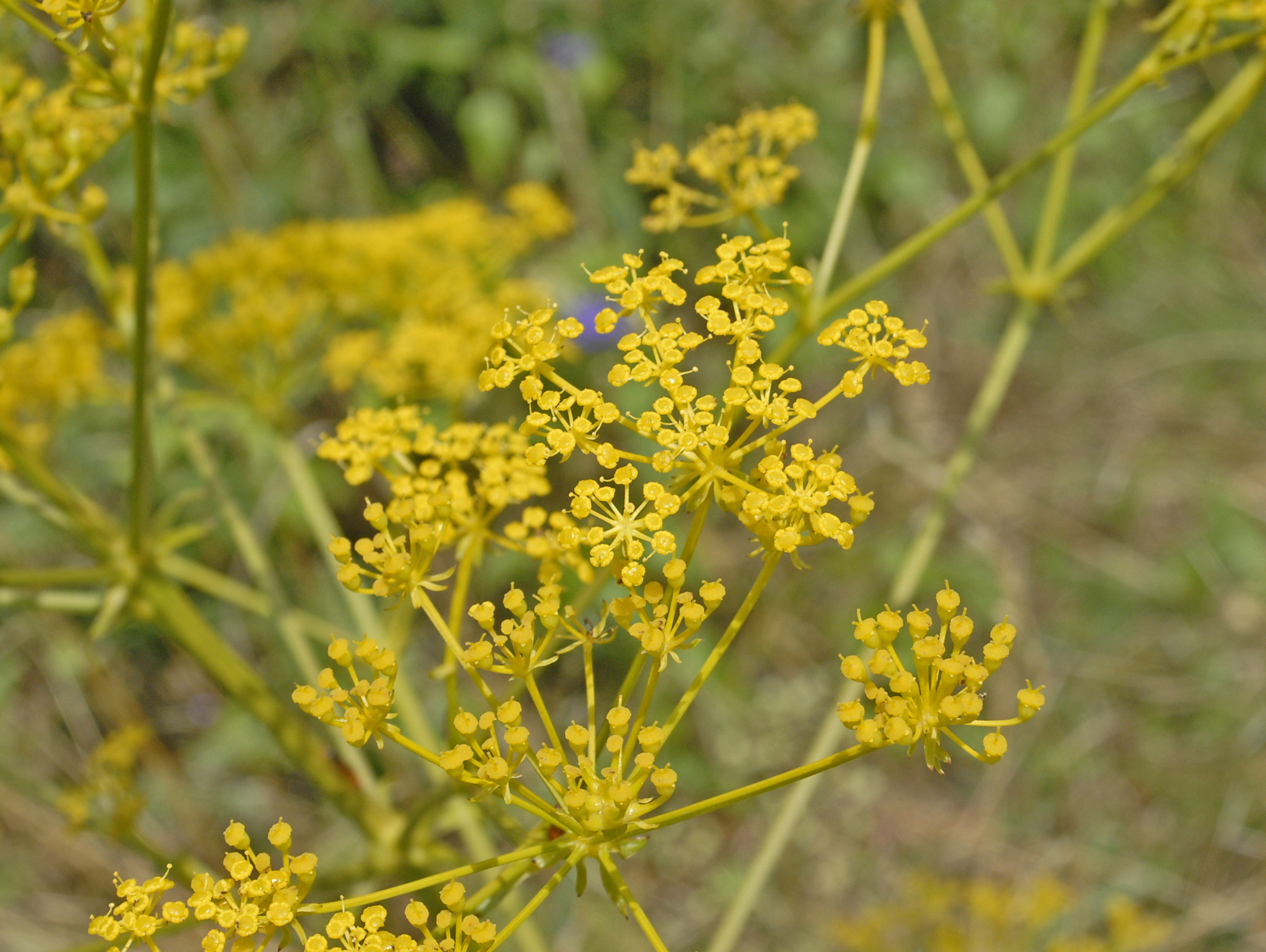
- Close-up offlowers

Scientific classification
- Kingdom: Plantae
- Clade: Tracheophytes
- Clade: Angiosperms
- Clade: Eudicots
- Clade: Asterids
- Order: Apiales
- Family: Apiaceae
- Genus: Ferulago
- Species: F. galbanifera

Binomial name
- Ferulago galbanifera W.D.J.Koch

Synonyms
- Ferula campestris Besser; Ferula daghestanica (Schischk.) M.Hiroe; Ferula meoides L.; Ferulago campestris (Besser) Grecescu; Ferulago daghestanica Schischk.; Ferulago dodonaei Kostel.; Ferulago meoides (L.) Boiss.; Lophosciadium meifolium DC., nom. superfl.

= Ferulago galbanifera =

Species of flowering plant

Ferulago galbanifera, synonym Ferulago campestris, is a herb of the family Apiaceae.

== Description ==
Ferulago galbanifera can reach a height of about 50–120 centimetres (20–47 in). This perennial herb has a branching stem and repeatedly pinnate leaves. They are ovate-triangular, petiolate, 30–60 cm long. It produces large, flat, yellow inflorescences, with a diameter of 6–18 cm. The five petals are yellow, almost rounded, curved inward at the top. This plant blooms from July to August. Fruits are oblong obovate, 12–20 mm long.

== Distribution and habitat ==
This species can be found in the Mediterranean area from Morocco to Turkey and eastwards to southern European Russia. It occurs in dry meadows, cliffs, rocky and calcareous areas, at an elevation of 0–900 metres (0–2,953 ft) above sea level.
