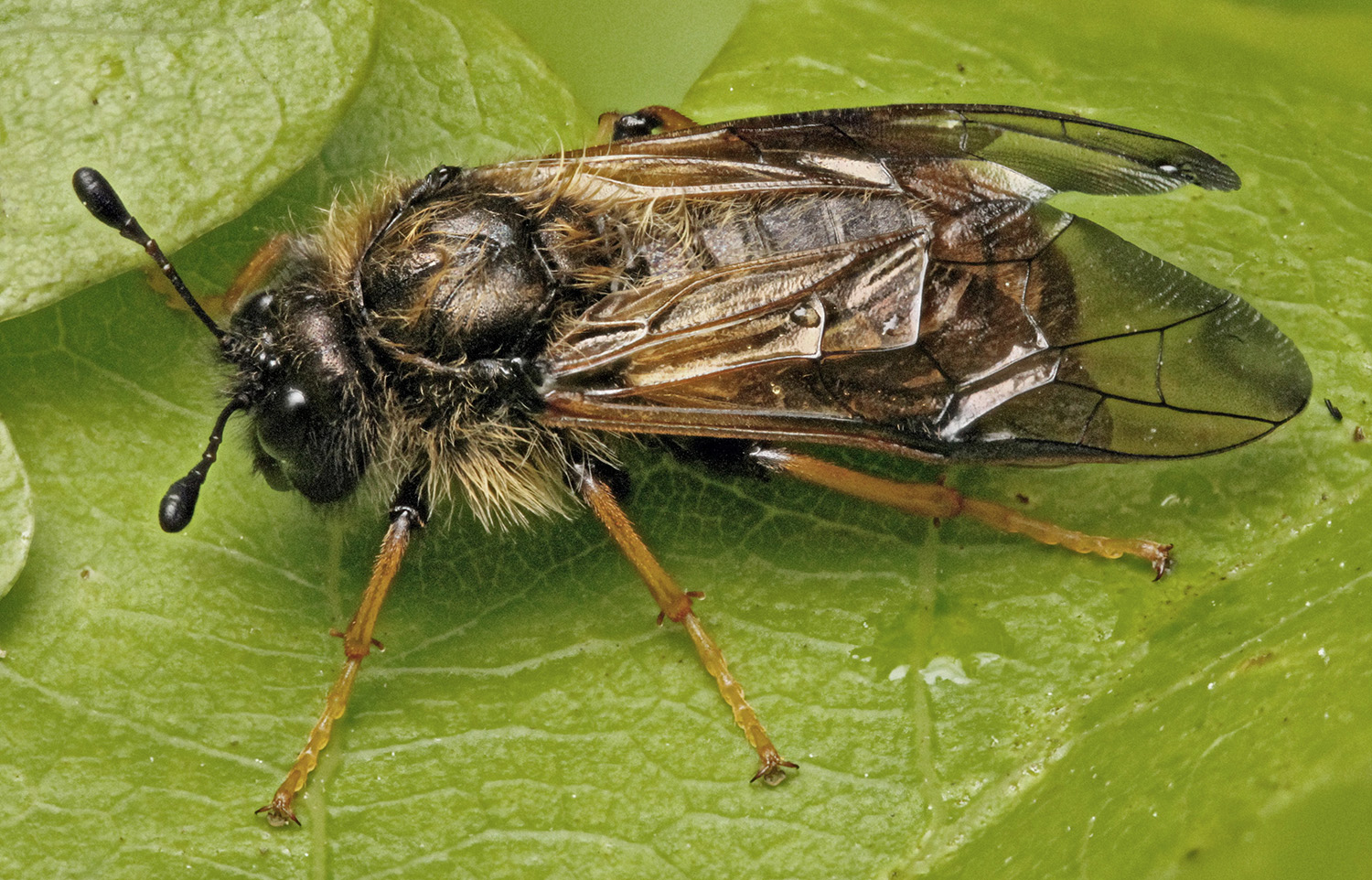
- Trichiosoma lucorum

Scientific classification
- Kingdom: Animalia
- Phylum: Arthropoda
- Class: Insecta
- Order: Hymenoptera
- Suborder: Symphyta
- Superfamily: Tenthredinoidea
- Family: Cimbicidae

Subfamilies
- Abiinae; Cimbicinae; Corynidinae; Pachylostictinae

= Cimbicidae =

Family of sawflies

Cimbicidae, the clubhorn sawflies, is a family of sawflies in the order Hymenoptera. There are more than 20 genera and 200 described species in Cimbicidae. Larvae are solitary herbivores.

The family is distinctive in having antennae with prominent apical clubs or knobs. The adults of some species can exceed 3 cm in length, and are among the heaviest of all Hymenoptera.

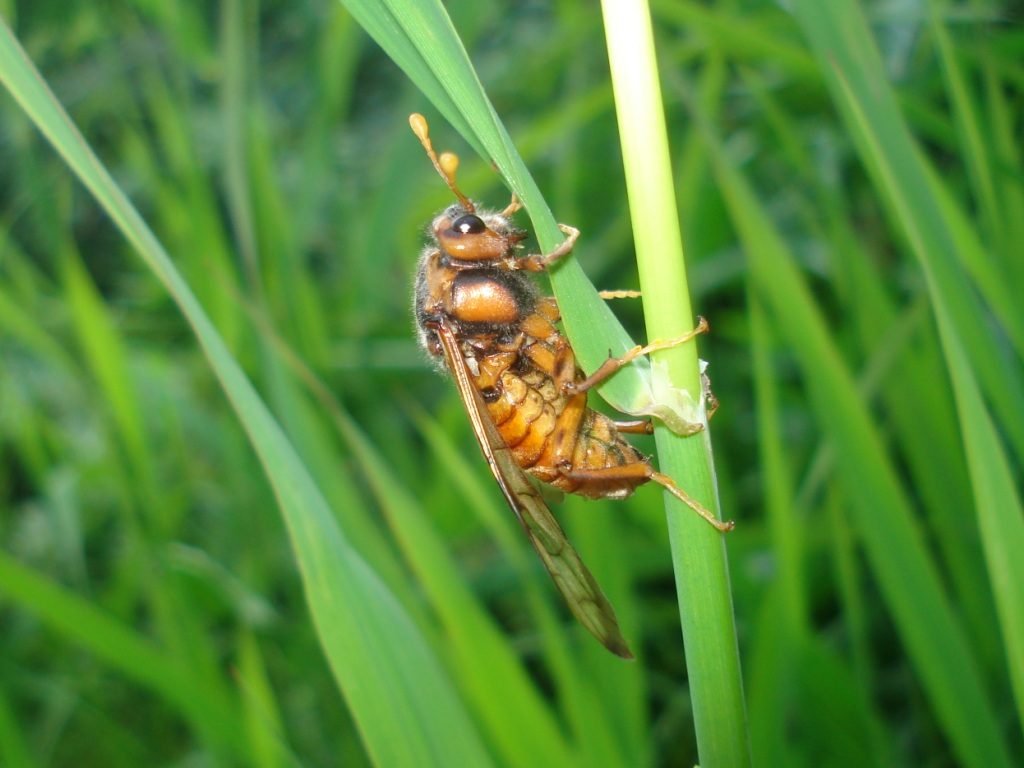
Cimbex

== Genera ==
These genera belong to the family Cimbicidae:

- Abia Leach, 1817
- Agenocimbex Rohwer, 1910
- Allabia Semenov & Gussakorskii, 1937
- Brasilabia Conde, 1937
- Cimbex Olivier, 1791
- Corynis Thunberg, 1789
- Leptocimbex Semenov, 1896
- Lopesiana Smith, 1988
- Odontocimbex Malaise, 1935
- Pachylosticta Klug, 1824
- Praia Wankowicz, 1880
- Pseudabia Schrottky, 1910
- Pseudoclavellaria Schulz, 1906
- Pseudopachylosticta Mallach, 1929
- Trichiosoma Leach, 1817
- †Allenbycimbex Archibald & Rasnitsyn, 2023
- †Cenocimbex Nel, 2004
- †Eopachylosticta Malaise, 1945
- †Leptostigma Archibald & Rasnitsyn, 2023
- †Phenacoperga Cockerell, 1908
- †Pseudocimbex Rohwer, 1908
- †Sinocimbex Zhang Junfeng, Sun Bo & Zhang Xiyu, 1994
- †Trichiosomites Brues, 1908
