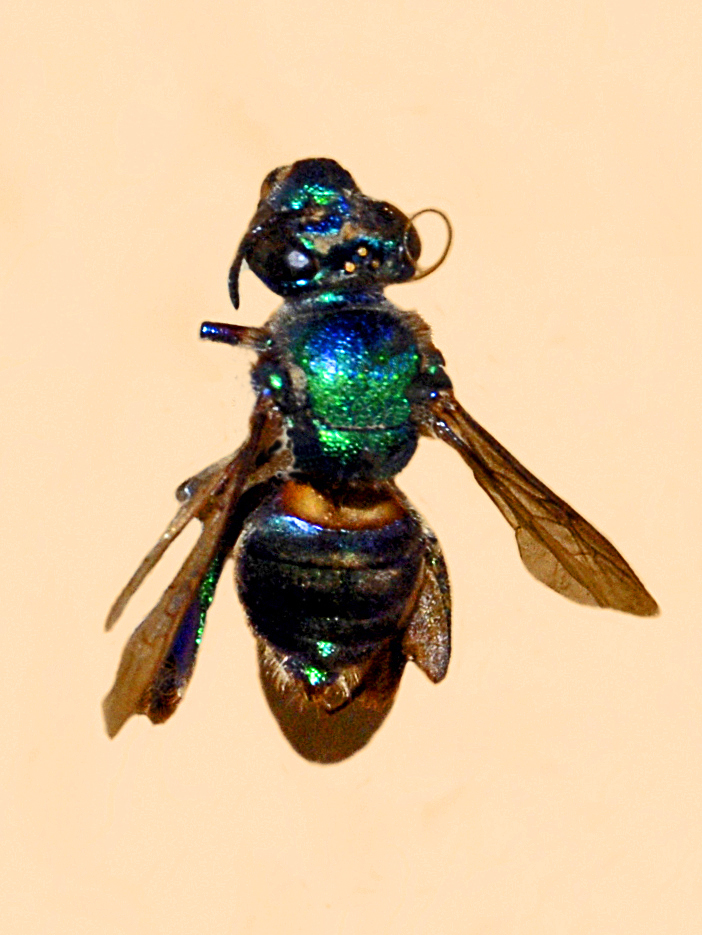
- Euglossa cordata from Peru. Museum specimen

Scientific classification
- Kingdom: Animalia
- Phylum: Arthropoda
- Clade: Pancrustacea
- Class: Insecta
- Order: Hymenoptera
- Family: Apidae
- Genus: Euglossa
- Species: E. cordata

Binomial name
- Euglossa cordata (Linnaeus, 1758)

Synonyms
- Apis cordata Linnaeus, 1758; Euglossa cyanaspis Moure, 1968

= Euglossa cordata =

Species of bee

Euglossa cordata is a primitively eusocial orchid bee of the American tropics. The species is known for its green body color and ability to fly distances of over 50 km. Males mostly disperse and leave their home nests, while females have been observed to possess philopatric behavior. Because of this, sightings are rare and little is known about the species. However, it has been observed that adults who pollinate certain species of orchids will become intoxicated during the pollination.

== Taxonomy and phylogeny ==
Euglossa cordata is a member of the genus Euglossa in the tribe Euglossini within subfamily Apinae of the hymenopteran family Apidae. Euglossini pollinate throughout the American tropics, and are known for their bright, metallic appearance. Euglossini is one of four tribes of the family Apinae, along with Meliponini (stingless bees), Bombini (bumble bees), and Apini (honey bees). There are five genera of Euglossini: Aglae, Exaerete, Eufriesa, Eulaema, and Euglossa.

== Description and appearance ==
Euglossa cordata is a small short-tongued species. Females possess claws with a basal tooth, while males have a similar or cleft claw with absent arolia (adhesive pads) in both. Unlike bees of the tribe Bombini, female mandibles have strong apical teeth. Male genitalia are extremely sclerotized with a distinct gonobase and small to moderately sized upper gonostylus. Larvae have small and pointed dorsolateral tubercles (a bone projection) on the thoracic and upper abdominal segment with two similarly shaped tubercles on the vertex. Among the genera of Euglossini, Euglossa are known to be especially metallic and glittery and smaller in body size, and E. cordata are no exception, as individuals are observed to be a brilliant green color.

== Distribution and habitat ==
Euglossa cordata have an exclusive neotropical distribution and are spread out throughout the South American region, particularly in Brazil. They reside in areas with high humidity and relatively stable and mild temperatures, in which nests have been found in urban areas, such as parks and gardens, where the bees are able to form nests and gather pollen and nectar. These areas have been colonized recently as many natural habitats have been destroyed or severely damaged. Adults have been observed to fly great distances, sometimes more than 50 km, for nectar or floral odors used for sexual attraction. This leads to a dispersal of the species, which prevents inbred mating. Nests are constructed and lined with resin.

== Colony cycle ==
A single female primarily starts a nest, and around 50% of the daughters of the next generation will remain with their mother in the nest, establishing a hierarchy with one dominant female and one to several subordinate females. Thus, there is no need for worker or queen bees in an independently moving species. Egglaying females remain in the nest for an average of 191 days; the longest observed duration for a foraging female was 53 days. Multi-female nests may exist due to nest reactivation by females of different generations, frequently as mother-daughter nests.

== Behavior ==
Euglossa cordata are of the genus Euglossa, whose species are solitary. In contrast to species such as Euglossa annectans and Euglossa hyancinthina, which are communal species, E. cordata have semi-social and eusocial organization, and display primitively eusocial behavior.

=== Nesting ===
Euglossa cordata uses resin to seal cracks and joints, and to seal the entrance hole inside the nest. To leave the nest, an individual creates a small round hole in the resin, big enough for one to pass through. The hole is never sealed when leaving the nest, even when leaving for the last time, but sealed many times during the day while working inside the nest, as well as in the evening. Before a new cell is made, the current cell is provisioned and sealed.

=== Pollination ===
Euglossa cordata are attracted to orchids mostly through odor. When visiting a euglossine flower, the pads of hair on their forefeet will brush on the surface of the flower for a short time. They will then hover near the flower and scrub their legs together, which then deposits some substance, whether it be pollen or nectar, in their inflated hind tibiae. This behavior is repeated many times, sometimes as long as 90 minutes in one visit. It has been suggested that the individuals will become intoxicated during these visits to the orchid flowers.

Females will collect pollen and nectar in various flowers, including flower that contain nectar in a short corolla where the long proboscis would hinder her from gathering nectar. Males will pollinate orchids but are also attracted to rotting logs, certain fungi, and other objects found in tropical forests. Orchids of the subtribe Catasetinae will place their pollinaria on the bee by a trigger mechanism ejects the pollinarium forcefully. In addition, several genera of the orchid subtribe Stanhopeinae deploy mechanisms, which depends on if the bee slips and falls. In various orchids with more complicated structures, the bee will position itself within the flower with great care and precision, and the pollinaria are placed on a specific location on the body of the bee.

Since the species is widespread, E. cordata is known to pollinate the more widespread orchid species such as Cycnoches ventricosum, Coryanthes macrantha, Coryanthes speciosa, Catasetum barbatum, Catasetum russellianum, and Catasetum maculatum. In addition, males also exhibit brushing behavior on rotten wood and infected living trees, as they may be attracted to fungal products. This behavior may have developed through an “accidental” pollination through a mutation developing an attractive perfume. Males will visit the bignoniaceous vine Saritae magnifica and brush the limb of the corolla, but will not enter the flower or effect pollination, as Saritaea may be visited by another species and E. cordata is considered an accessory visitor.

=== Mating ===
Although little is known of the mating habits of E. cordata, they have been observed to display behavior consistent with other species of the tribe Euglossini. Males will collect fragrances from orchids, and will use these in acts of territorial display and courtship. Single mating, or monandry, is largely consistent across species, in which the female will select a mate based on male fragrance phenotypes. Males establish non-resource based display sites for fragrance signaling, usually centered around perches. The males will then release their fragrances through a performance of a series of hovering flights. Females will then quickly land on the perch to be mounted by a male.

=== Dominance hierarchy ===
In colonies of E. cordata, the oldest female is designated as the dominant female, while the others behave as her subordinates. Dominant females will enforce their dominance over reproduction over other females through aggression and antagonistic behavior. However, all adult females are totipotent and can lay eggs themselves. While the dominant female rarely leaves the nest, she will guard the nest and oviposits in cells provisioned and oviposited by the subordinate females. This oviposition occurs after oophagy and immediately after a subordinate female has laid an egg and sealed the cell. Age determines task allocation. Only when a subordinate female replaces the dominant female are the tasks reversed.

=== Brood parasitism ===
Dominant females of E. cordata display egg laying and egg replacing behaviors characteristic of brood parasitism. It has been suggested that it would be evolutionarily advantageous for a mother to lay her eggs elsewhere if she had the opportunity to do so. Thus, a mother gains advantage by replacing her daughter's eggs with her own eggs, which diverts her resources from producing grand-offspring to producing more of her own offspring. Finally, a mother may eat her daughter's eggs to gain more nutrients, increasing her own longevity and fecundity.

=== Foraging ===
Females and males of E. cordata are site-constant foragers for a given period of time. Females must forage for nectar, pollen, and resins for themselves as well as their brood, while males only have to forage for themselves. E. cordata will visit tubular nectar-rich flowers of the native and introduced species of Apocynaceae, Bignoniaceae, and Convolvulaceae plants. When foraging territories have been established and provide enough resources, E. cordata will not fly as far as opposed to when territories are unstable. In addition, when they do fly long distances, they have a homing ability, which allows them to use visible landmarks from a long distance to guide their way back.

== Parasites ==
Stelis (Odontostelis) bilineolata is an observed parasite of the nests of E. cordata. Female S. bilineolata will open the cells that have been closed by resin and remove E. cordata eggs and larvae. A parasitic female is able to detect if a cell is suitable to raise its young without opening the cell. She will then kill any present larvae, pupae, or adults by crushing the unopened cell with her mandibles, or by opening the cell and stinging the bee inside. Cells that have been deemed unsuitable for the development of her offspring are subsequently destroyed.
