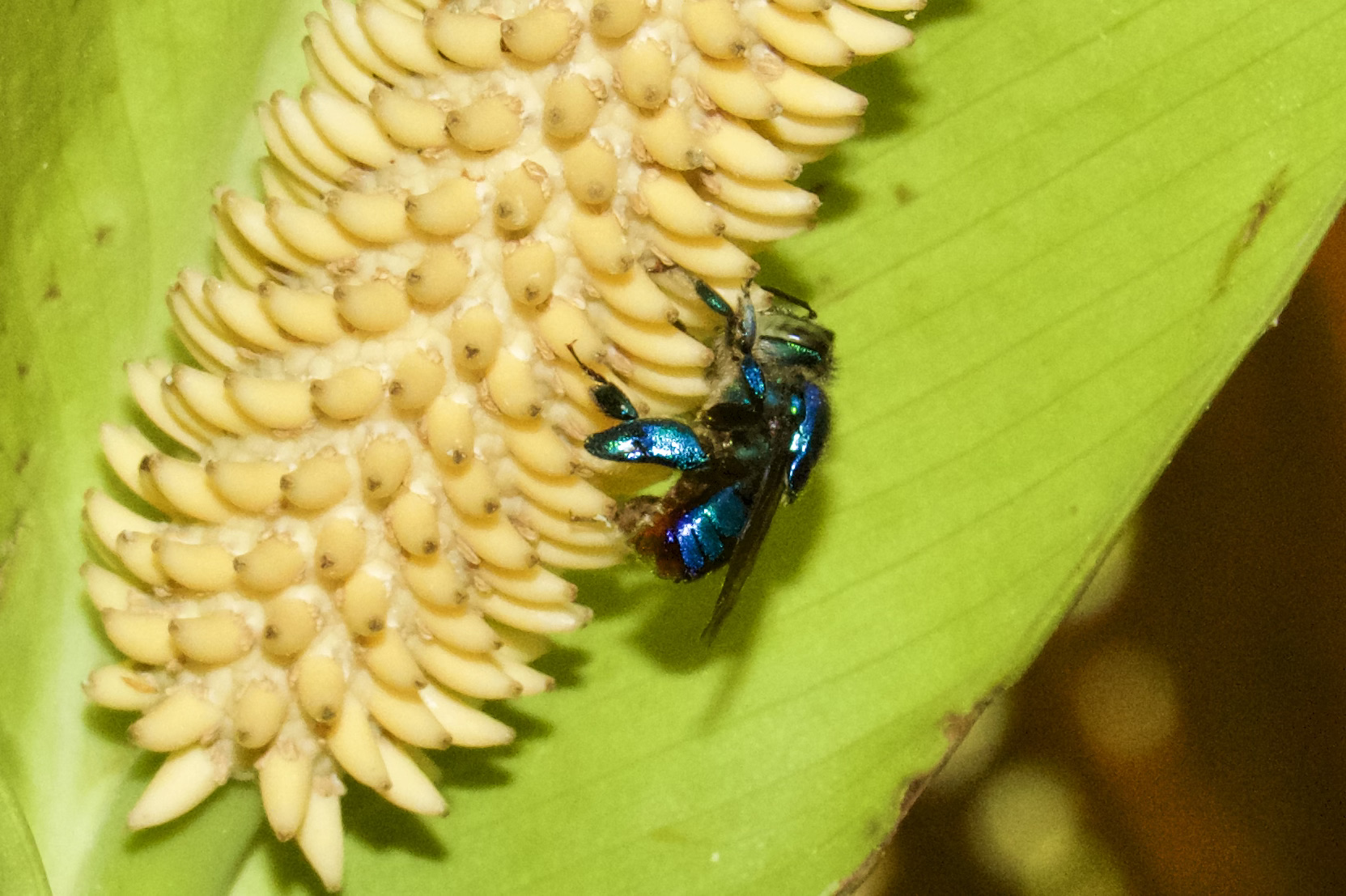

Scientific classification
- Domain: Eukaryota
- Kingdom: Animalia
- Phylum: Arthropoda
- Class: Insecta
- Order: Hymenoptera
- Family: Apidae
- Genus: Euglossa
- Species: E. mixta

Binomial name
- Euglossa mixta Friese, 1899

= Euglossa mixta =

Species of insect

Euglossa mixta is a species of orchid bee native to Central America and South America, it is a member of the genus Euglossa a group of brilliant green and blue bees specialized in pollinating certain species of orchids.

== Description ==
E. mixta are varying shades of glossy metallic blue or deep violet with a refractive sheen transitioning to purple, red and finally orange at the tip of the abdomen. E. mixta can grow to a length of about 1.5 cm (0.59 in).

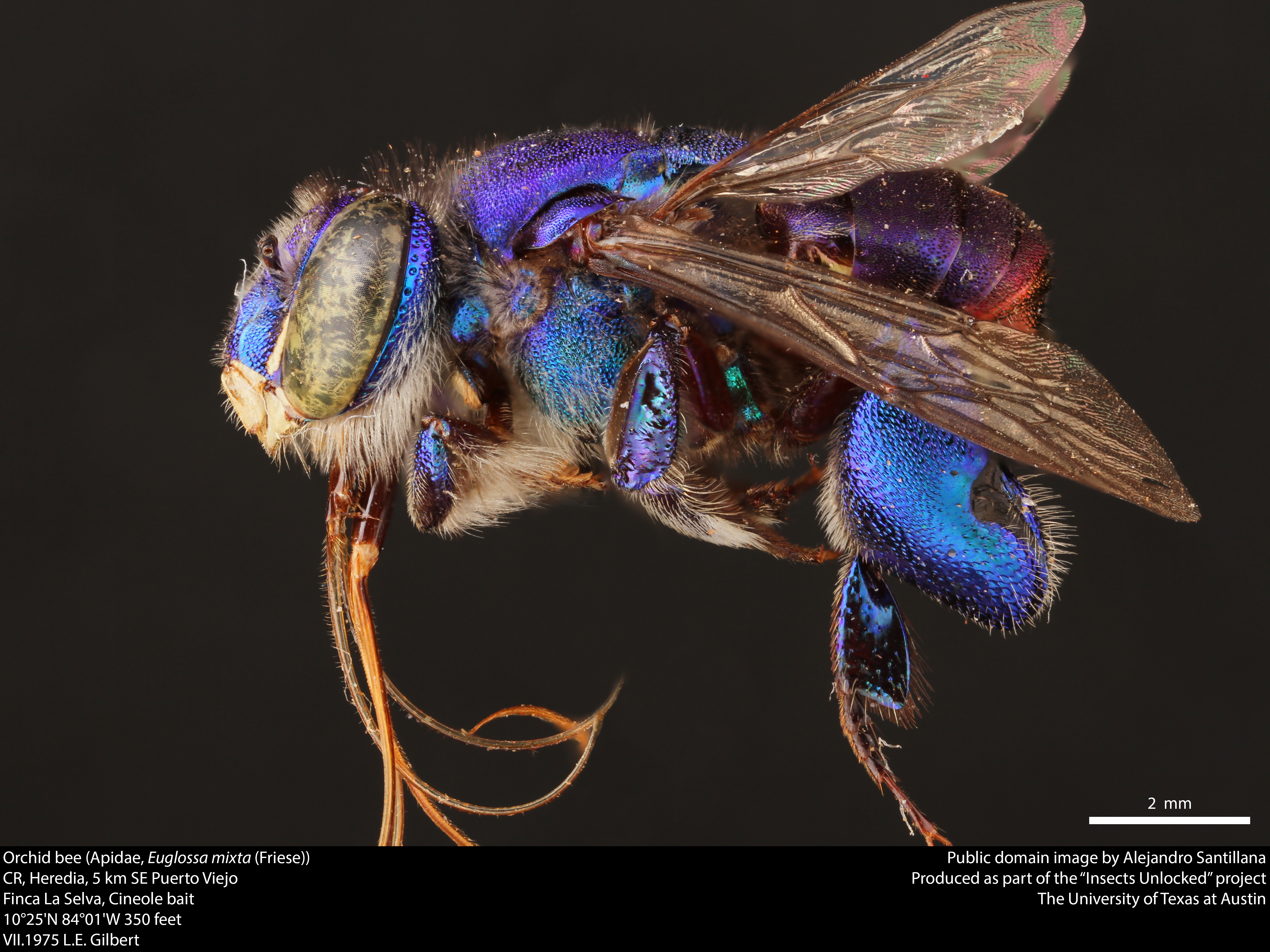
E. mixta collected specimen.

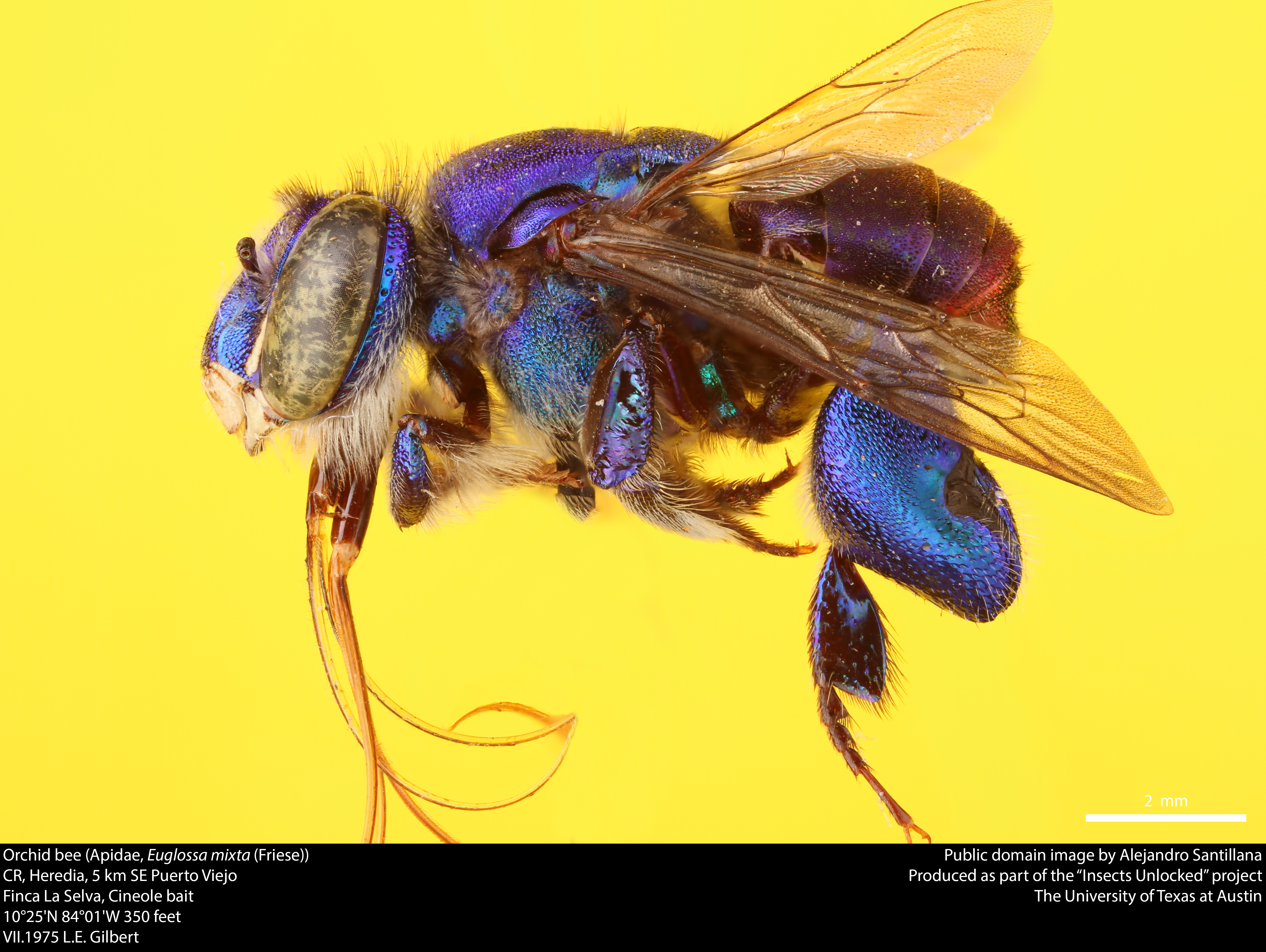
E. mixta

== Distribution and habitat ==
The native range of E. mixta extends northwards and westwards from Southern Brazil all the way to the isthmus of Tehuantepec, Mexico. With records from South America being scattered while records from further north in Central America seem to indicate a more dense population of this species, especially between Nicaragua and Panama. Though this distribution may be affected by extensive sampling in Costa Rica.

E. mixta lives in tropical forest habitats at elevations from near sea level to at least 1,500 m (4,900 ft) above sea level. Euglossine bees tend to depend on intact forest habitats, possibly due to a higher abundance of orchids in these forests.

== Ecology ==
Species of this genus are known to pollinate orchids and tamarillo plants, as well as a number of other flowering plants. Euglossine bees are of great ecological importance to a number of orchids for which they are the sole pollinators. Information is needed on which species of orchid in particular is visited by E. mixta. There exists anecdotal and photographic evidence of bee visiting Spathiphyllum cochlearispathum which may be for the purpose of gathering pollen, protein, or scents. They are generally solitary bees and in order to attract a mate, males gather a collection of various scents creating a sort of perfume which they store in a pit on their hind legs then releases this fragrance and fanning their wings to disperse it.

=== Reproduction ===
Females construct a nest of wax about the size of a peach which vaguely resembles a mantis egg case. Male Euglossini bees lack a stinger, while females of this tribe possess a stinger and can be aggressive around a nest, though being solitary they rarely present a threat otherwise.

=== Pollination and ecological importance ===
Some of the orchids that have been observed to be pollinated by E. mixta are in genera Mormodes and Kefersteinia. Other species of orchids, may simply provide scents as E. mixta has been observed to rub itself on petals and sepals but not access the pollen.

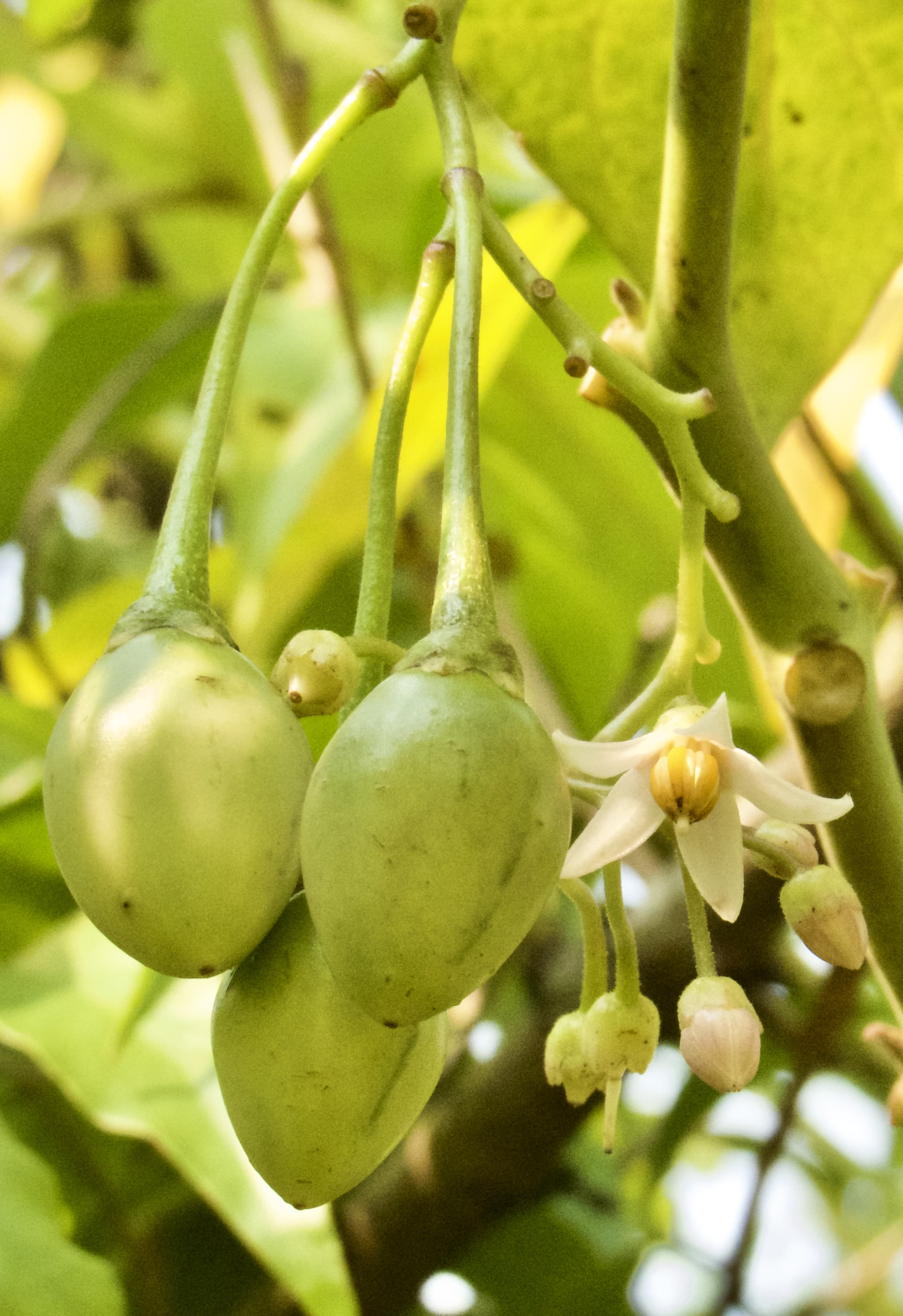
Tamarillo is one of the flowers pollinated by Euglossa bees.

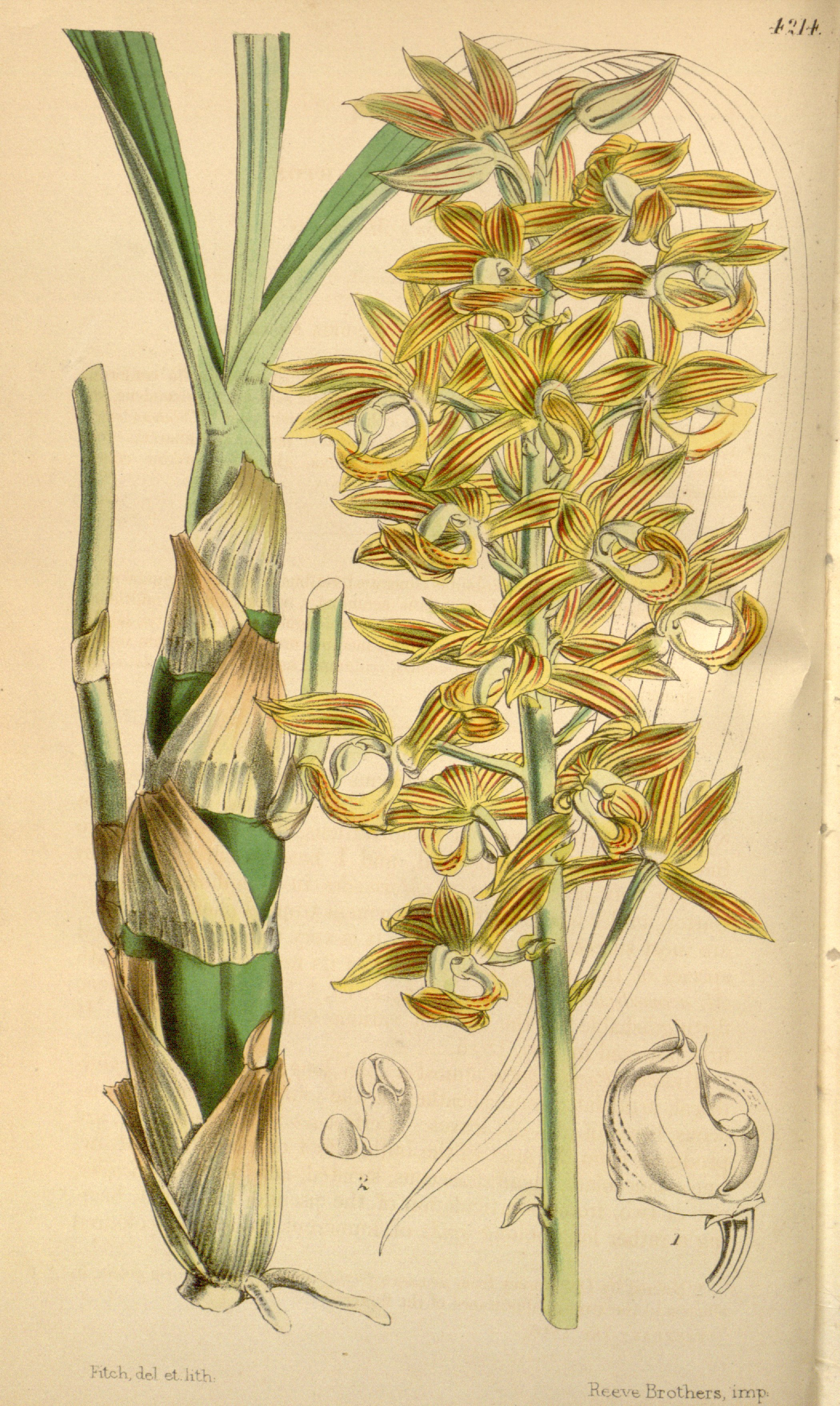
Mormodes cartoni, one of the species likely pollinated by E. mixta.

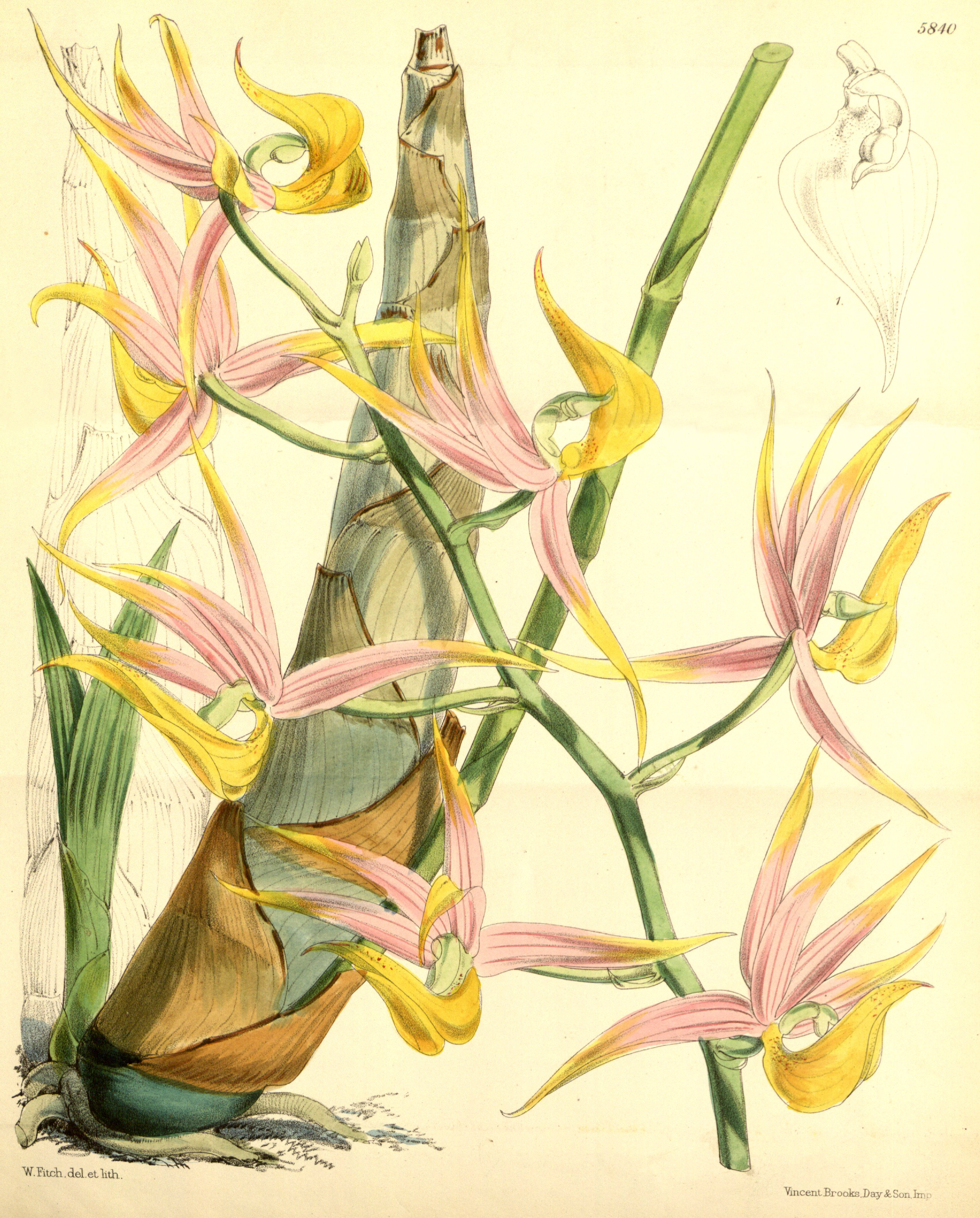
Mormodes colossus, one of the species likely pollinated by E. mixta.

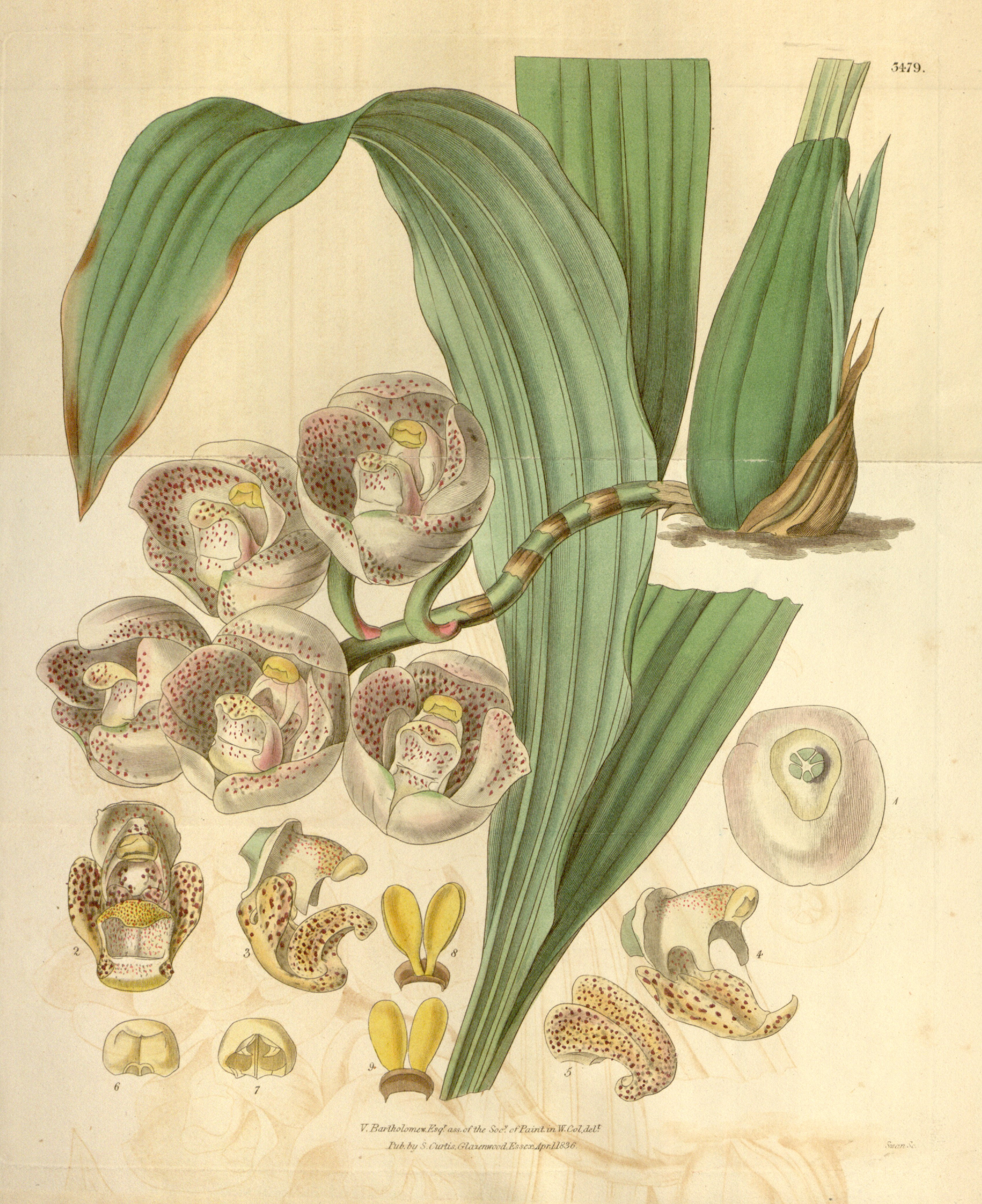
Peristeria (pendula) sp. from which male E. mixta collect scents.

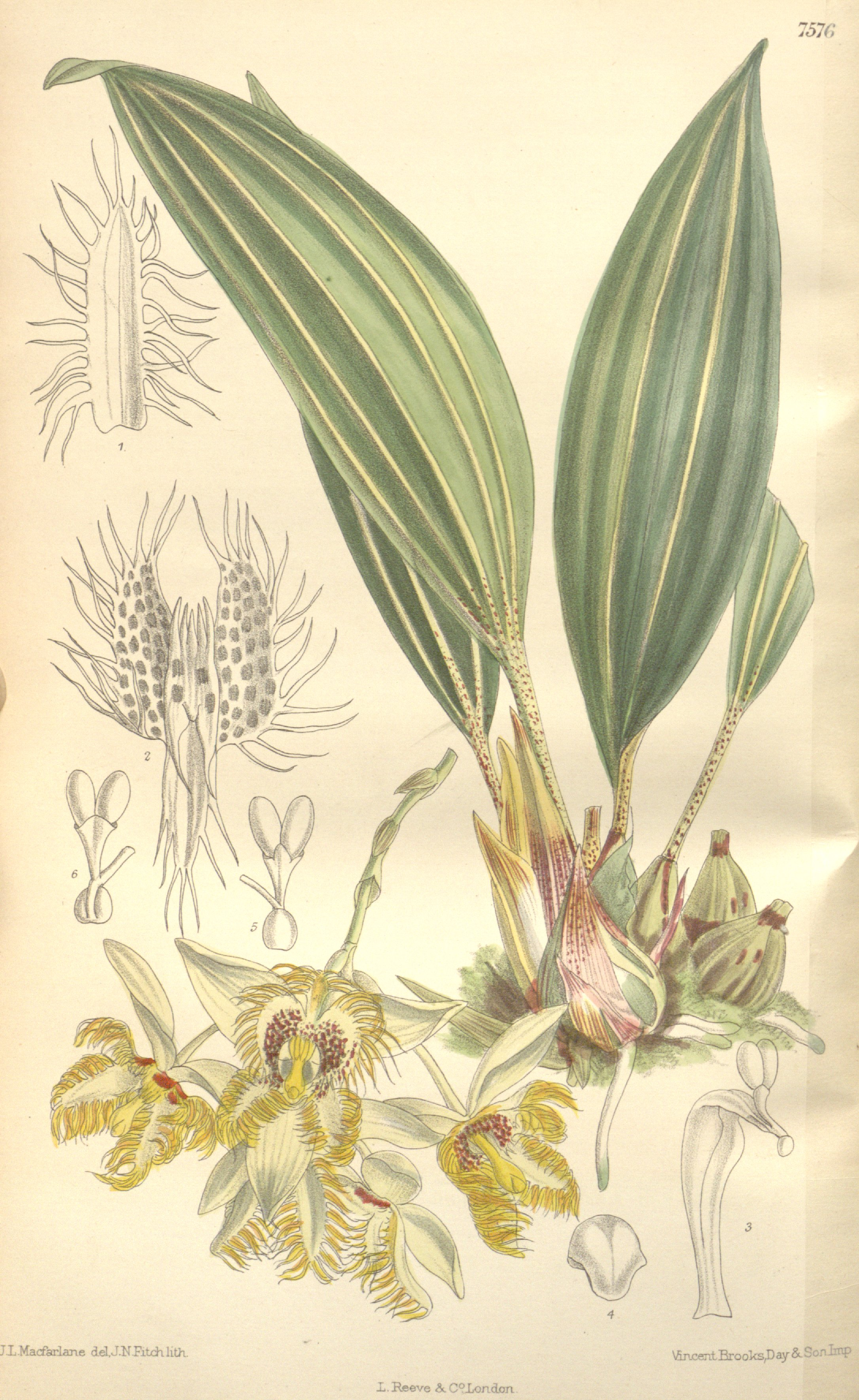
Sievekingia (fimbriata) reichenbachiana, another species from which scents are collected by male E. mixta.

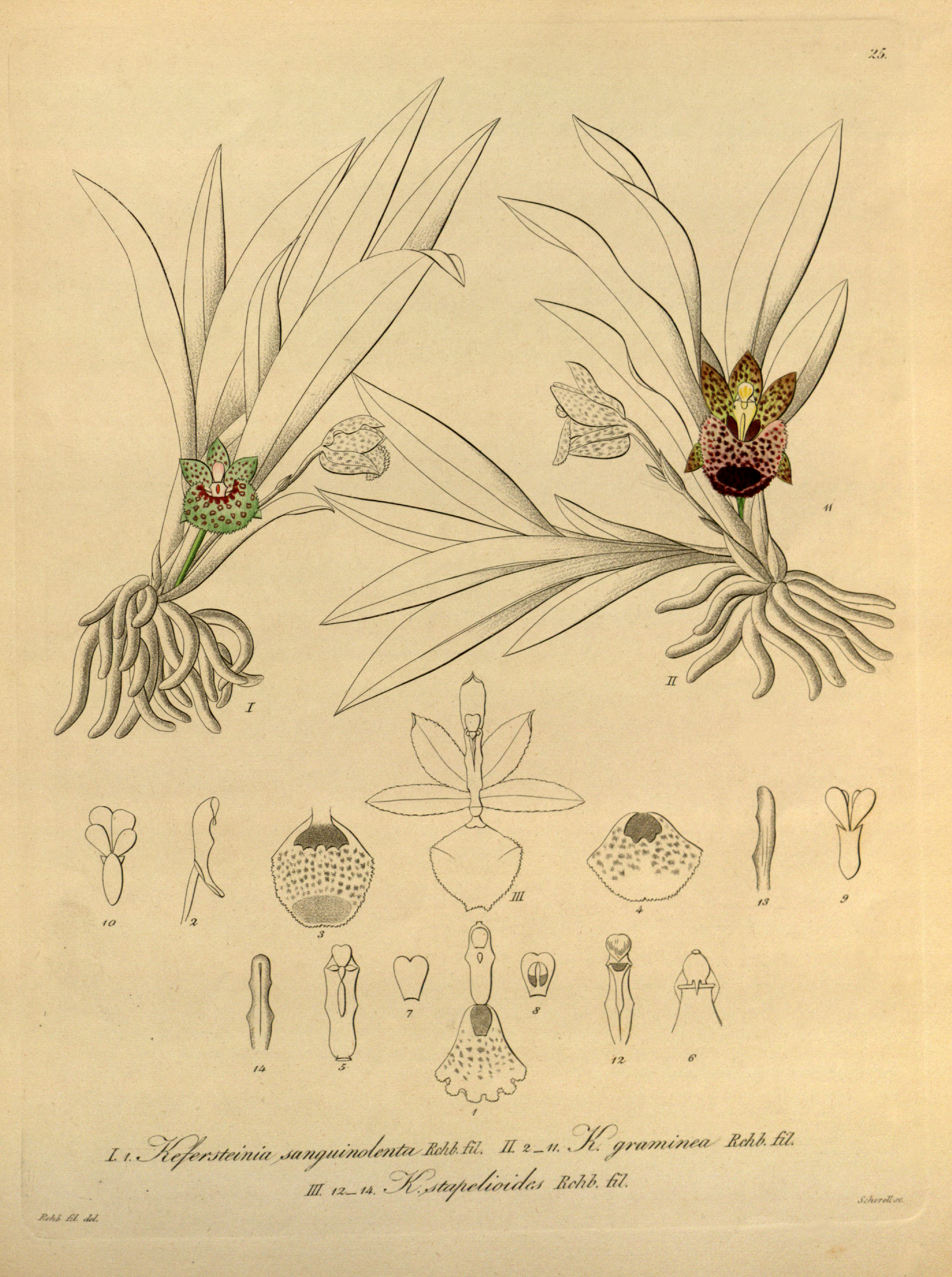
E. mixta has also been recorded carrying pollen from an orchid in the genus Kefersteinia.

== Nomenclature and etymology ==
The genus name Euglossa is Latin for "well glossed" in reference to the bright metallic coloration of these bees. The species name mixta is Latin for "mixed" referring to the spectrum of colors, this name was described by Friese in 1899, originally as a subspecies E. variabilis mixta.

== Taxonomy ==
The taxonomy of bees in the genus Euglossa is highly complicated as there are many similarities and groups of species which are genetically closely related.

Within the family Apidae, the subtribe of the orchid bees, Euglossini, contains 240 species described to science. Euglossini can be understood to be split into two generic groups or super genera. Euglossa being genetically distinct from the lineage of the other four genera Eufriesea, Eulaema, Aglae, Exaerete. The genus Euglossa (Latreille, 1802) is made up of six sub-genera with a total of around 100 described species, there is much debate as two the exact makeup of these six sub-genera. Based on genetic analysis Euglossa mixta appears to be most closely related to E. sapphirina within the species group typified by E. analis.

Category		
Family:	Apidae	Bees
Tribe:	Euglossini	Orchid bees
Super Genera:	Euglossa	
Genera:	Euglossa	"shiny" orchid bees
Sub-genera:	Euglossa	
Group (uncategorized):	[analis group]	"shiny blue orchid bees with bright abdomen"
Species:	E. mixta	
