= Bazinga (disambiguation) =

"Bazinga" is the catchphrase used by Sheldon Cooper in The Big Bang Theory.

Bazinga may also refer to:

- Bazinga rieki, a genus of rhizostome jellyfish
- Euglossa bazinga, a species of euglossine bee
- "Bazinga" (song), a 2021 song by SB19

== See also ==
- Behzinga, English YouTuber and co-founder of the EU YouTube group Sidemen,
- BaZnGa, a ternary compound of barium, zinc, and gallium
