= Euglossa sovietica =

Scientific classification
- Domain: Eukaryota
- Kingdom: Animalia
- Phylum: Arthropoda
- Class: Insecta
- Order: Hymenoptera
- Family: Apidae
- Genus: Euglossa
- Species: E. sovietica

Binomial name
- Euglossa sovietica Nemésio, 2007

Species of bee

Euglossa sovietica is a Euglossine bee species found in the western Brazilian Amazon. It is believed to be part of the Euglossa purpurea group.
