= Euglossa jacquelynae =

Scientific classification
- Domain: Eukaryota
- Kingdom: Animalia
- Phylum: Arthropoda
- Class: Insecta
- Order: Hymenoptera
- Family: Apidae
- Genus: Euglossa
- Species: E. jacquelynae

Binomial name
- Euglossa jacquelynae Nemésio, 2007

Species of bee

Euglossa jacquelynae is a Euglossine bee species found in Central Brazil.
