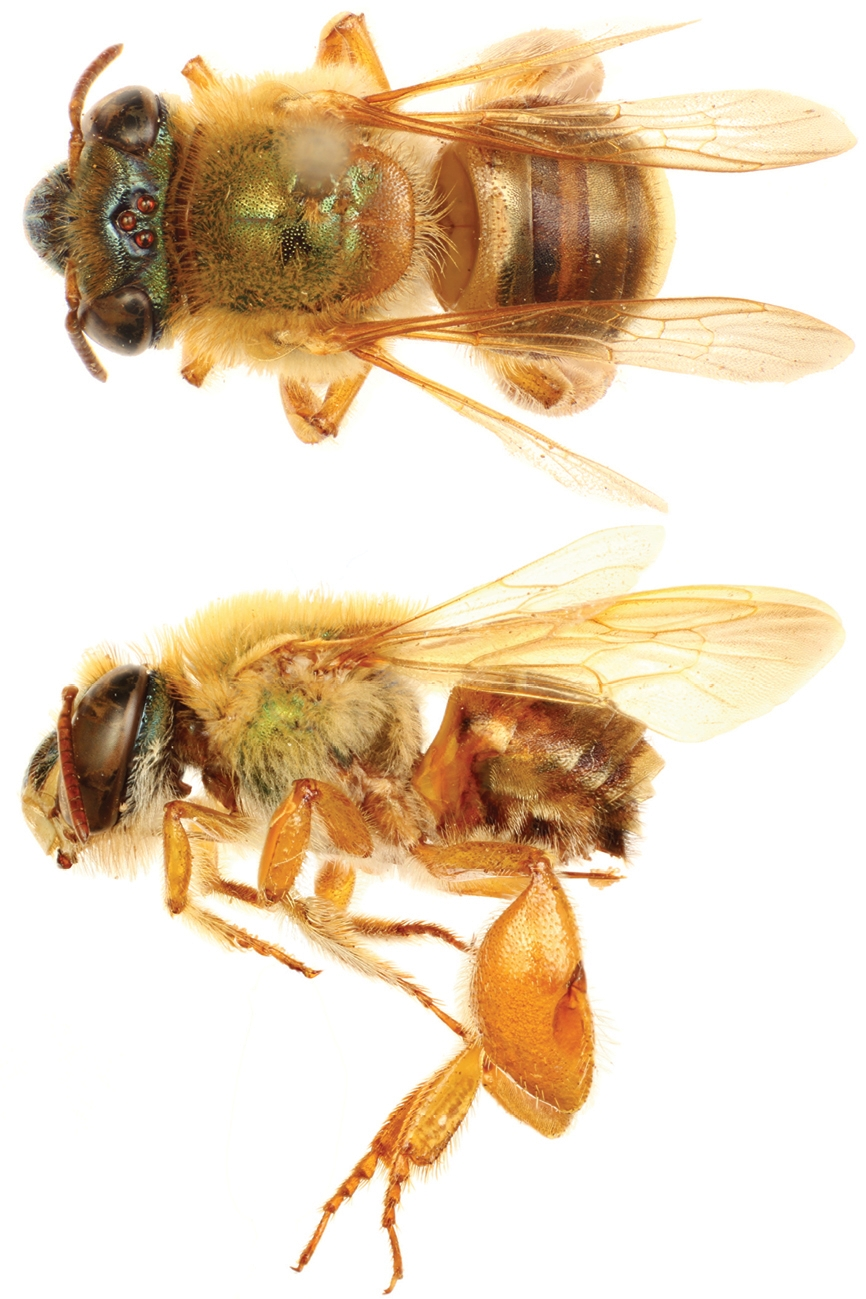
- Euglossa decorata male

Scientific classification
- Domain: Eukaryota
- Kingdom: Animalia
- Phylum: Arthropoda
- Class: Insecta
- Order: Hymenoptera
- Family: Apidae
- Genus: Euglossa
- Species: E. decorata

Binomial name
- Euglossa decorata Smith, 1874

= Euglossa decorata =

Species of bee

Euglossa decorata is a species of euglossine bee.

== Taxonomy ==
This species is placed in the genus Euglossa, subgenus Euglossella. It is a member of the decorate species group which consists of bees with a brown to orange colored body with an iridescent or metallic sheen.
