= E. bidentata =

E. bidentata may refer to:

- Ensliniana bidentata, a leafcutter bee
- Epermenia bidentata, a fringe-tufted moth
- Eudonia bidentata, a grass moth
- Euglossa bidentata, an orchid bee
