= Catasetum yavitaense =

Scientific classification
- Kingdom: Plantae
- Clade: Tracheophytes
- Clade: Angiosperms
- Clade: Monocots
- Order: Asparagales
- Family: Orchidaceae
- Subfamily: Epidendroideae
- Genus: Catasetum
- Species: C. yavitaense

Binomial name
- Catasetum yavitaense G.A. Romero & C. Gómez (1998)
- The distribution of Catasetum yavitaense

Species of orchid

Catasetum yavitaense, the Yavita catasetum is an epiphytic pseudobulbeous species of orchid native to Amazonian Venezuela.

== Taxonomy and etymology ==
It was first described in 1998 and named after Yavita, a small village in Amazonas state, Venezuela, where it was discovered.

== Description ==
Catasetum yavitaense is a medium, hot epiphyte that can have up to 10 green flowers on a usually singular inflorescence that has emerged from a mature pseudobulb. It also has the ability to shoot pollinium onto a pollinator which are usually Euglossine bees.

== Distribution ==
Catasetum yavitaense is endemic to Venezuela specifically in the Amazon rainforest near Yavita, Amazonas state and grows at low elevations.

== Care ==
Catasetum yavitaense needs a lux level of 45000, a shade level of 62.5%, and a humidity level of 70%. It also goes into a leaf-drop state during winter like other Catasetum species.
