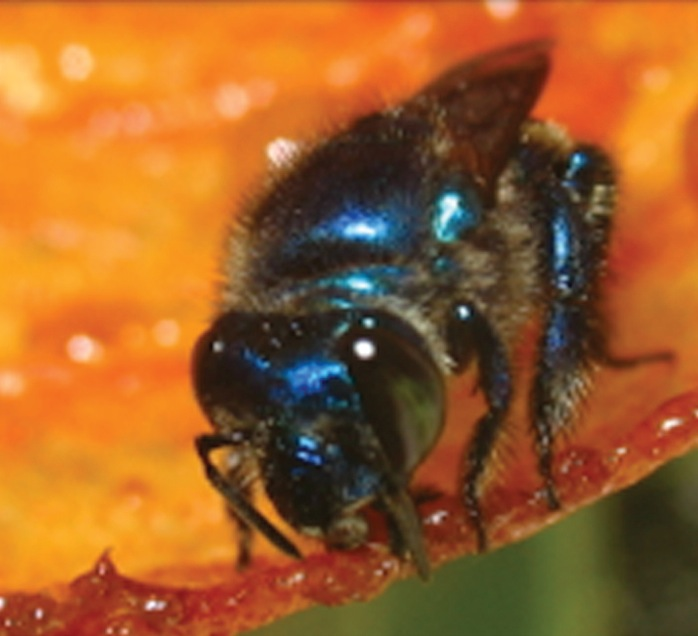
- Female shaping resin along the rim of the growing nest envelope

Scientific classification
- Kingdom: Animalia
- Phylum: Arthropoda
- Clade: Pancrustacea
- Class: Insecta
- Order: Hymenoptera
- Family: Apidae
- Genus: Euglossa
- Species: E. hyacinthina

Binomial name
- Euglossa hyacinthina Dressler, 1982

= Euglossa hyacinthina =

Species of bee

Euglossa hyacinthina, is a species of the orchid bee tribe Euglossini in the family Apidae. With a tongue that can get as long as 4cm, this orchid bee species is found in Central America. Living in a neotropical climate, E. hyacinthina has adapted to hot and humid weather. The bee has darkly shaded, translucent wings and a metallic, glossy blue skeleton.

"Medium sized, large body stature, long-tongued, and fast," E. hyacinthina is characterized by its eusociality and unique solitary life-style. Additionally, this species has no worker or queen bees and females dominate in an atypical social hierarchy. The many individual nests of E. hyacinthina reveal the sociality of the bees, and the origin of this can be discovered by studying these nests. E. hyacinthina may also be part of mimicry complexes within Euglossa.

== Taxonomy and phylogeny ==
Euglossa is a genus of a larger tribe known as euglossine bees. Euglossini (orchid bees) is a tribe of Apinae and are mostly characterized as solitary as they display little social behavior. Named after their 4 cm long tongues, euglossines are commonly known as long-tongued bees. The tribe Euglossini is a diverse and very widespread neotropical taxon that comprises "5 genera and nearly 200 species," one of the genera being the Euglossa. It is the largest genus in the tribe with over 129 identified species including E. hyacinthina.

Among the distinct species of euglossine bees, the genus Euglossa is known for its bright, metallic skeleton. In neotropical forests, euglossines make up to 25% of the total bee population. The Neotropical Euglossa bees are close relatives of Apini (honey bees) and Bombini (bumblebees).

Researchers have identified from four genes (16S, 28S, cytochrome b, LW Rh) that Bombini and Meliponini (stingless bees) form a clade, but there is uncertainty on whether Euglossini is a sister group to either Apini or Bombini/Meliponini.

There are five genera of Euglossini and five hypotheses have been formulated on the relationships of these genera (Aglae, Exaerete, Euglossa, Eufriesea, and Eulaema). No definite conclusion has been reached because of the incongruency at the root. The most strongly supported hypothesis is that Aglae is the base group with Eufriesea and Eulaema as the sister group to an Exaerete and Euglossa clade or to either of the latter genera.

== Description and identification ==
The image above displays the glossy metallic blue that E. hyacinthina is known for. The wings are of a darker shade and translucent, with females having pollen baskets in their hind legs. A study done that was published in 2003 by Elizabeth Capaldi showed that females and males generally display monomorphism, with the exception of the thorax. In female bees the thorax was not only larger when compared to male bees but also had a small patch of elongated, plumous hair. Because this species is of the order Hymenoptera, there was a significant deviation from the 1:1 ratio; in fact, 82% of the population consisted of females. Female orchid bees can control their offspring's gender, which can skew the sex ratio.

Euglossine nests are usually dispersed across a wide range. E. hyacinthina construct nests only using resin on the side of secondary growth plants. Nests of a light orange color signify recent construction of the nest; as time passes, the light orange turns to a dark brown and the vertical ridges signify differences in age. The nests are about 6.0 cm long (0.7 cm variability) and 4.2 cm wide (0.8 cm variability). In the nest are cells that house larvae and store food to ensure its growth; this is commonly known as "brooding". As the number of cells increase, we can predict that the number of bees living in that particular hive will increase at a linear rate. Euglossini nests are found from sea level to about 1500–1600 m above sea level.

== Distribution and habitat ==
E. hyacinthina is found in Neotropical habitats. While more Euglossini species are present in wet forests, some are found in savannas and forests along rivers. The range of E. hyacinthina is restricted to Central America, including Panama and Costa Rica.

== Colony cycle ==
=== Colony initiation ===
The only tribe in the family Apidae that do not form large colonies are the Euglossini, because they tend to move independently. Because of this distinction, there are no worker bees or queen bees because there would not be a need for such roles in independent movement. This was proven through the analysis of the number of females in comparison to the number of cells in the hive. Because the number of females outweigh the number of cells, one can assume that there are some female bees who are reproductively inactive. When creating a new nest, a female bee will make foraging trips for resin in order to construct the hives and this process will last anywhere from 8 minutes to 15 minutes. The construction of the hive itself usually takes anywhere from 10 to 22 minutes. As a result, the process of foraging and constructing a nest takes a total of 18 minutes to 37 minutes for a female.

=== Colony growth ===
Nesting is a seasonal venture for E. hyacinthina. In a study done by Eberhard in 1988, the data clearly showed a skew in nest formation for certain seasons. In October 1985, 6 of 13 nests were new, and in October 1987, of five nests, one was new. No nests were formed in the months of April, May or June. As a result, E. hyacinthina grow in numbers during the fall season, while declining in the summer season. This is most likely due to the number of predators during each season and the amount of available resources. In the fall season, the rate of predator appearance was lower and an increase in resin availability was higher, while the summer season brought an increase in predators and decrease in resin availability.

== Behavior ==
A female Euglossa hyacinthina working on the construction of her nest envelope.

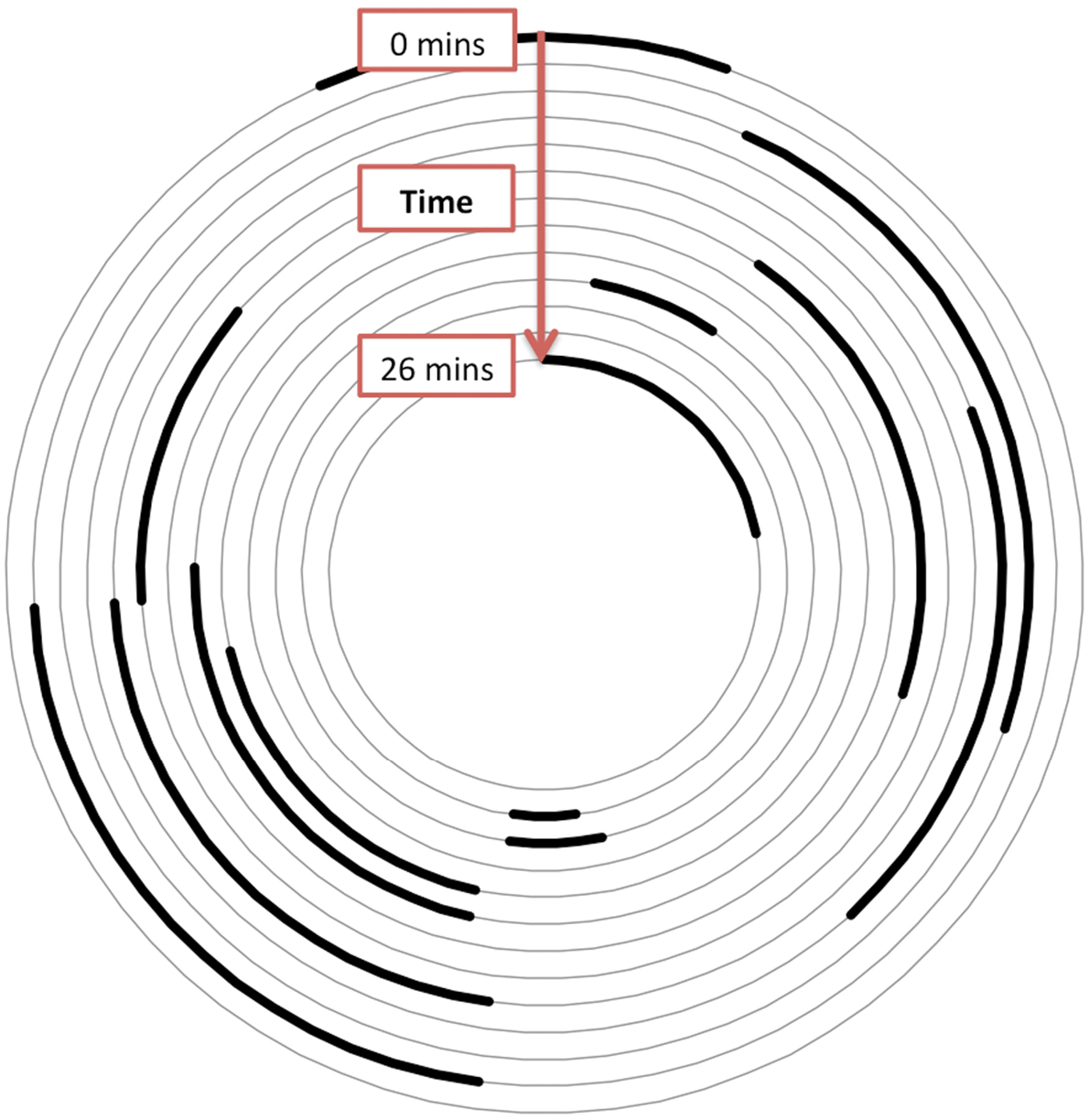
Graphical representation of work effort showing how the bee moves from one side of the nest to another while constructing the envelope. Each arc represents the area the bee worked in a given work session, each lasting approximately from 1 to 2 min. The concentric arcs represent 13 sequential work bouts during a 26 min session of construction; the outer-most arc is the starting position at the beginning of the session and the inner-most one is the ending position.

Before 2012, the structure of E. hyacinthina nests had been described, but the actual nesting behavior had never been studied. In 2012, a team of scientists documented this behavior for the first time. Video recordings of the bees constructing their nests were made using a GoPro HD camera mounted about 25 cm from the nest. The video is to the left of this paragraph.

=== Dominance hierarchy ===
The dominance hierarchy is different from traditional bee hierarchies, because Euglossini do not have worker bees or queen bees and the females are more dominant than males. Successful nests are usually founded by single, solitary females and these females stay until the emergence of brood. Once the original founder is done with the nest, nest reactivation occurs by associated females of the same generation and high relatedness. The origin of association of females along with various behavior patterns result in social patterns within nests. The term eusociality perfectly describes the hierarchy within E. hyacinthina because in a colony consisting of a mother and a group of daughters, the evolutionarily stable strategy is often for the mother to cheat and guard the new offspring while children forage for food. In this sense, the mother would be the "queen" and the daughters would be foraging for siblings rather than offspring and would be considered the "worker bees". This concept also gives rise to the concept of age-based dominance hierarchy as the older female bees seem to be in a position of power.

=== Communication ===
Male bees interact with female bees through their fragrances. After collecting various fragrances throughout its lifetime, the male is ready to unleash this resource to females when wanting to reproduce. Reproductive communication is accomplished through sharing of fragrances.

=== Reproduction suppression ===
Oftentimes, when a female leaves her nest, subsequent female bees eat the existing eggs for nutrients and to produce their own eggs. This allows for consumption of high quality nutrients, which improves fecundity and longevity of life and exploit the advantages of parasitism.

=== Mating behavior ===
This species follows a single mating policy, which is expected because of its taxonomy. Monandry within the Euglossini is consistent with the idea that females select a single mate with the best genes and best fitness based on male fragrance phenotypes. Males of many species of orchid bees establish display sites for fragrance signaling. These display sites are usually centered around perches – usually tree trunks – where males repeatedly hover over this perch to attract females. As a result, males invest much of their lives to stock up on fragrances so that they can mate. This process is very cumbersome because females mate only once; there is a lot of energy and risk taking in order for males to be successful. Males are constantly fighting over fragrances and the best perches to attract females. The ability for males to store fragrance is a direct reference to their genetic quality. Males, in combination with fragrance quality, hover around a selected perch to share their fragrance. The female bee then chooses a male bee to mate with.

== Kin selection ==
Since there are no worker bees and queen bees, the most important relationships are between the mother and her children. This species is of the order Hymenoptera thus females arise from a fertilized egg while males develop from unfertilized eggs. Thus daughters of a brood will be 75% related to each other, and anywhere from 25–50% related to their brothers. This also supports the eusociality displayed by E. hyacinthina because the bees are trying to increase genetic relatedness in offspring and consequently increase efforts in caring for the young.

== Fragrances ==
"Matings are very rarely observed, but reportedly occur in or around the small territories that males defend on vertical perches on tree trunks or stems in the forest understory. At these perches, the males perform a characteristic display during which they may buzz their wings or show brief hovering flights. The potential release of fragrances during the display may lure in receptive females, ostensibly over some distance." Male Euglossines are attracted to diverse sources of fragrance such as flowers and sap. They land and apply a mixture of lipids produced by their labial glands. Then, the nonpolar fragrance compounds, such as those containing aromatic rings, dissolve in the lipids and subsequently place in the male Euglossa. Then, using all three pairs of its leg, the bee transfers the mixture into its tibiae. The fragrances play an important role in courtship as these compounds are used to obtain mates. Although the use of fragrances during courtship has not been fully uncovered, many scientists believe the release of this compound before mating allows females to identify genetic quality. This may infer that Euglossa form leks to perform their displays; however, the lek hypothesis is weakened by the fact that many displays are performed solitarily.

== Nesting ==
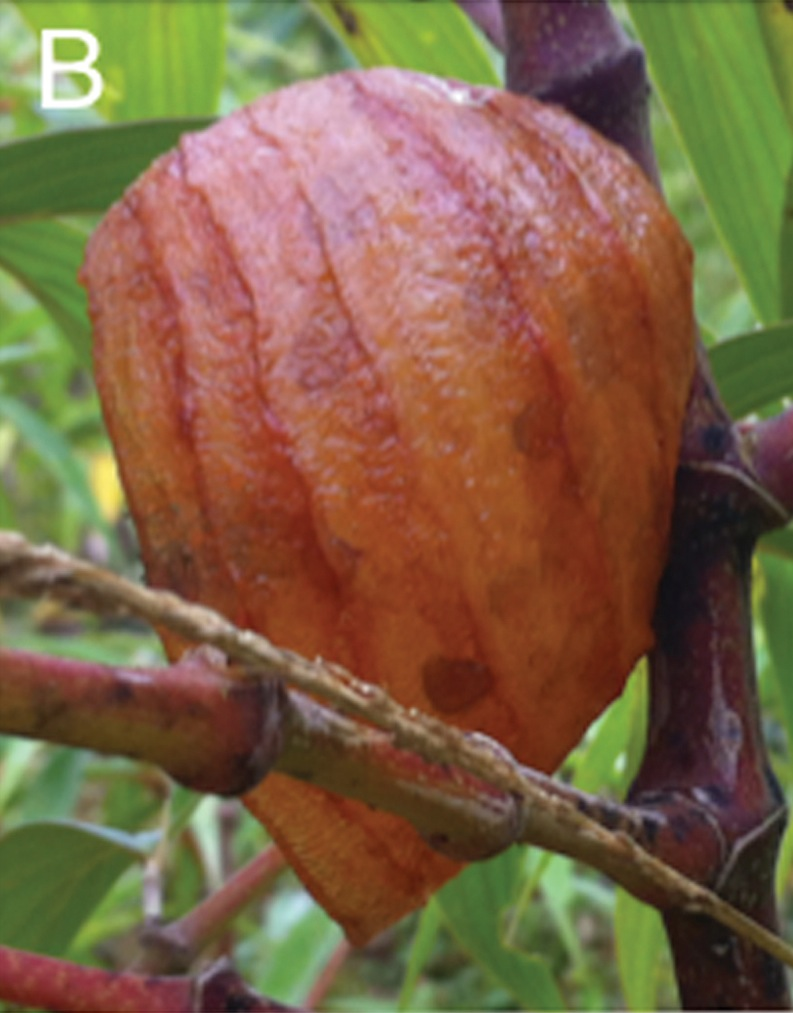
Interior view of a nest of Euglossa hyacinthina under construction – JHR-029-015-g001B

E. hyacinthina are the only species of the apine clade that do not aggregate in large groups or have queen and worker bees. As a result, we can trace back social behavior of bees through the examination of this specific species. Oftentimes, nests are inhabited by multiple females and there is always a trade-off between group-nesting and solitary nesting. E. hyacinthina must assess whether living in a group will lower chances of predation while having lower reproductive success due to multiple female habitation. An experiment done by Eberhard in 1988, showed that E. hyacinthina often live in groups with an average of 2.1 females (1.2 variability) and often consist of same generation (sister-sister) or different generation (mother-daughter) nesting. There is kin selection associated with this behavior and the method of reusing nests; usually the daughter will inherit a preexisting nest. Although the sex ratio of 1:1 suggests there are solely individually acting bees in nests, there is also evidence that suggests there is some form of communication between nest mates. When females seal the nest during the night or inclement weather, females will always wait until all inhabitants of the nest are safely back. Additionally, there has been very little noticeable aggression among nest mates.

Advantages to nesting include increased vigilance against predation due to the increased inhabitants. If nests are solely inhabited, there is a great chance that predators will prey on nests when the female bee is out foraging for food. In contrast, when nests are co-inhabited, other female bees are able to take care of the brood when one is foraging or if one dies unexpectedly.

== Mimicry ==
Many taxonomic problems have arisen from various species resembling each other very closely. Müllerian mimicry arises when two or more poisonous species that are not closely related adapt to each other and start mimicking each other's warning signals. While Eulaema and Eufriesa mimic each other through color scheme and patterns, mimicry within Euglossa is much less obvious because there is less variation. Still, it is possible that many of the green species in any given area are, to some extent, Müllerian mimics. With very similar body structure, the easiest way to distinguish Euglossa species is by skeleton color. While green coloration is most common in Euglossa, bronze is the major color in Costa Rica, and in Panama, blue becomes much more frequent as altitude increases. The patterns found on these bees are thus suggestive of mimetic complexes.

== Interaction with other species ==
=== Diet ===
E. hyacinthina forage for nectar and pollen.

=== Pollen sources ===
Listed below are some of the pollen sources for Euglossine bees.

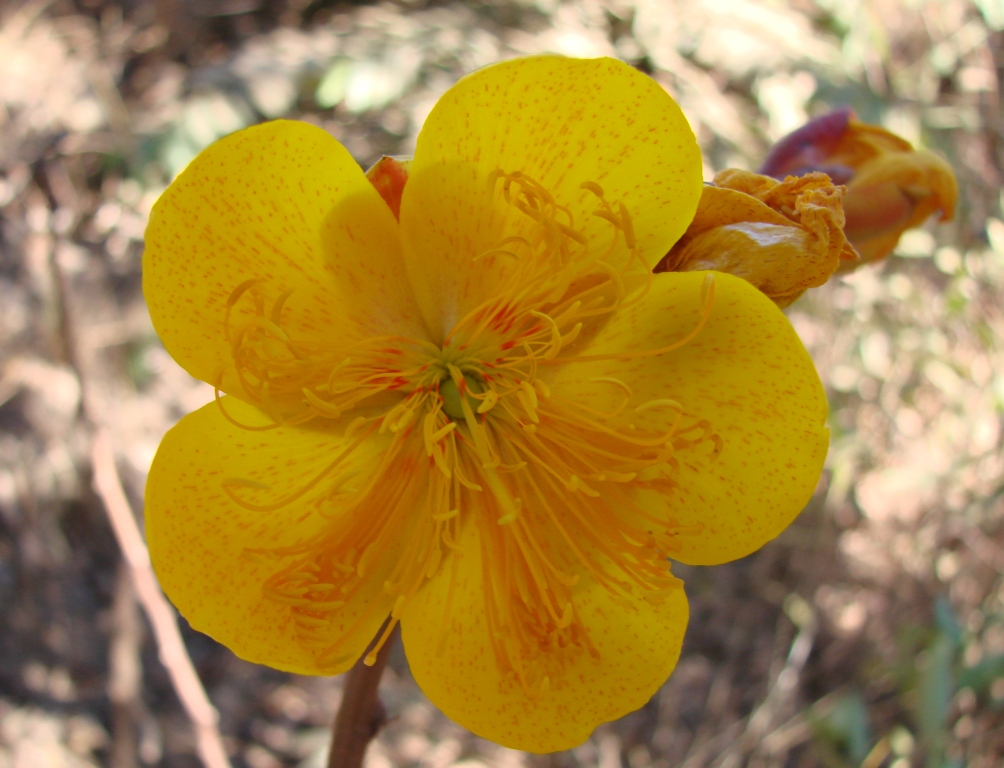
Bixaceae

- 1. Bixa (Bixaceae)
- 2. Cochlospermum (Cochlospermaceae)
- 3. Oncoba (Flacourtiaceae)
- 4. Clusia (Guttiferae)
- 5. Psidium (Myrtaceae)
- 6. Swartzia (Leguminosae)
- 7. Cassia (Leguminosae)
- 8. Sauvagesia (Ochnaceae)
- 9. Solanum (Solanaceae)
- 10. Xiphidium (Haemodoraceae)

=== Defense ===
Female euglossines have a powerful stinging apparatus. However, bee stings are rare as they are solitary and do not zealously protect their nests. Males, on the other hand, do not have stings. Stings give females an evolutionary advantage over males. As a defense mechanism, the stinging apparatus explains the sex ratio in favor of the females.

== Human importance ==
For neotropical habitats, orchid bees are important in maintaining homeostasis through the pollination of various orchid flowers. With one Euglossa species pollinating near 74 different plant species belonging to 41 families, E. hyacinthina also pollinate various flowers within Costa Rica. As Euglossini can fly long distances, with Eufriesea surinamensis holding the record at 23 km, they are responsible for cross-pollinating, which fosters genetic diversity in flora.
