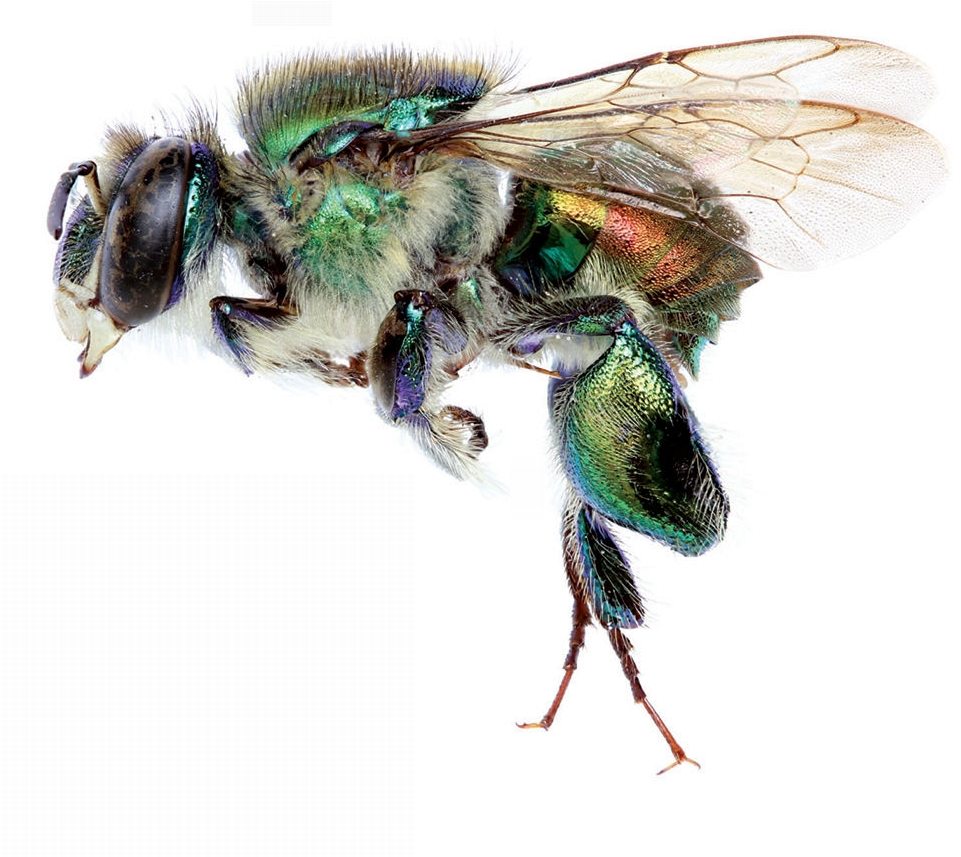
- Euglossa villosa male

Scientific classification
- Domain: Eukaryota
- Kingdom: Animalia
- Phylum: Arthropoda
- Class: Insecta
- Order: Hymenoptera
- Family: Apidae
- Genus: Euglossa
- Species: E. villosa

Binomial name
- Euglossa villosa Moure, 1968

= Euglossa villosa =

Species of bee

Euglossa villosa is a species of orchid bee in the genus Euglossa. It has been found in Mexico, Guatemala, Nicaragua, Costa Rica, and Panama.

== Description ==
It is a metallic green with a bronzy iridescence on the mesoscutum, metatibia, and metasoma.
