= Euglossa solangeae =

Scientific classification
- Domain: Eukaryota
- Kingdom: Animalia
- Phylum: Arthropoda
- Class: Insecta
- Order: Hymenoptera
- Family: Apidae
- Genus: Euglossa
- Species: E. solangeae

Binomial name
- Euglossa solangeae Nemésio, 2007

Species of bee

Euglossa solangeae is a Euglossine bee species found in coastal southeastern Brazil. It is believed to be part of the Euglossa stellfeldi group.
