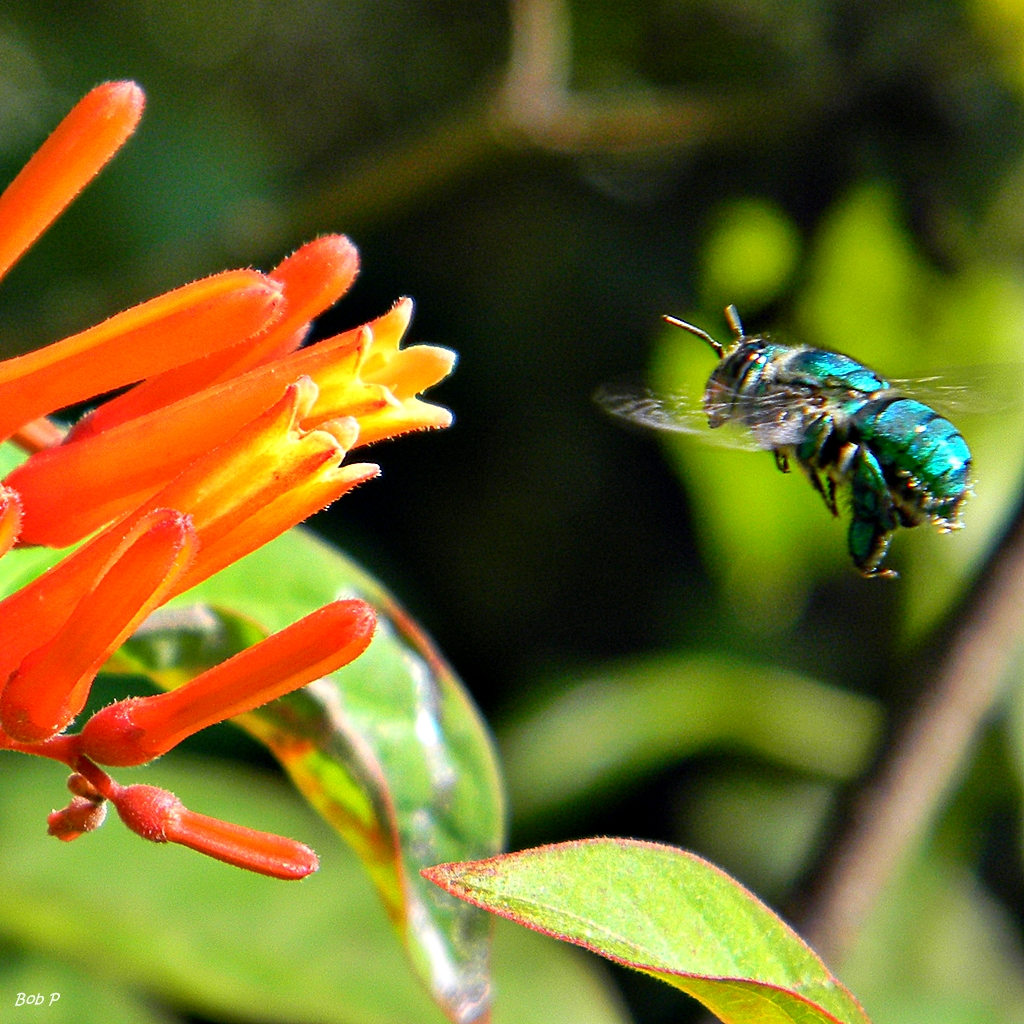
- Green orchid bee approaching flowers of the firebush Hamelia patens

Scientific classification
- Kingdom: Animalia
- Phylum: Arthropoda
- Clade: Pancrustacea
- Class: Insecta
- Order: Hymenoptera
- Family: Apidae
- Genus: Euglossa
- Species: E. dilemma

Binomial name
- Euglossa dilemma Bembé & Eltz, 2011

= Euglossa dilemma =

Species of bee

Euglossa dilemma, the green orchid bee or dilemma orchid bee, is a species of solitary euglossine bee native to a broad area of Central America, and recently introduced to Florida in the United States. It was first detected in Broward County, Florida in 2003, and initially identified as Euglossa viridissima, but further study revealed that E. viridissima as previously defined consisted of two cryptic species, and the one present in Florida was new to science.

== Taxonomy ==
Euglossa viridissima is a species of green orchid bee from Central America in which the males have two teeth on their mandibles.^{α} The very similar bee that was first observed in Florida in 2003 was found to have three such teeth. Sequencing data from a mitochondrial gene was unable to separate E. viridissima and E. dilemma, indicating they are closely related and form a clade within Euglossa. However, microsatellite allele frequencies varied between the two groups. Males of these bees store aromatic compounds extracted from various environmental sources in pouches on their hind legs. Certain characteristic compounds present as main ingredients in these perfumes in E. dilemma were found to be absent in E. viridissima. Electroantennography found differences between the groups in olfactory sensitivity to isomers of HNDB (2-hydroxy-6-nona-1,3-dienyl-benzaldehyde). It was therefore concluded that E. dilemma is a cryptic sister species of E. viridissima.

== Description ==
Green orchid bees are varying shades of glossy metallic green and can grow to a length of about 1.3 cm (0.5 in). The membranous wings are dark-coloured and translucent and the female has pollen baskets on her hind legs. The male has an enlarged joint on his hind leg where there is a pit for storing substances he gathers from plants. The female but not the male possesses a sting which can be used on more than one occasion but which is not as painful to humans as a honeybee's sting. This bee is very agile in the air, hovering for lengthy periods and darting between flowers. It might be confused with sweat bees in the family Halictidae, such as Augochloropsis, but orchid bees have much longer proboscises in order to gather nectar from flowers with long corolla tubes.

== Distribution and habitat ==
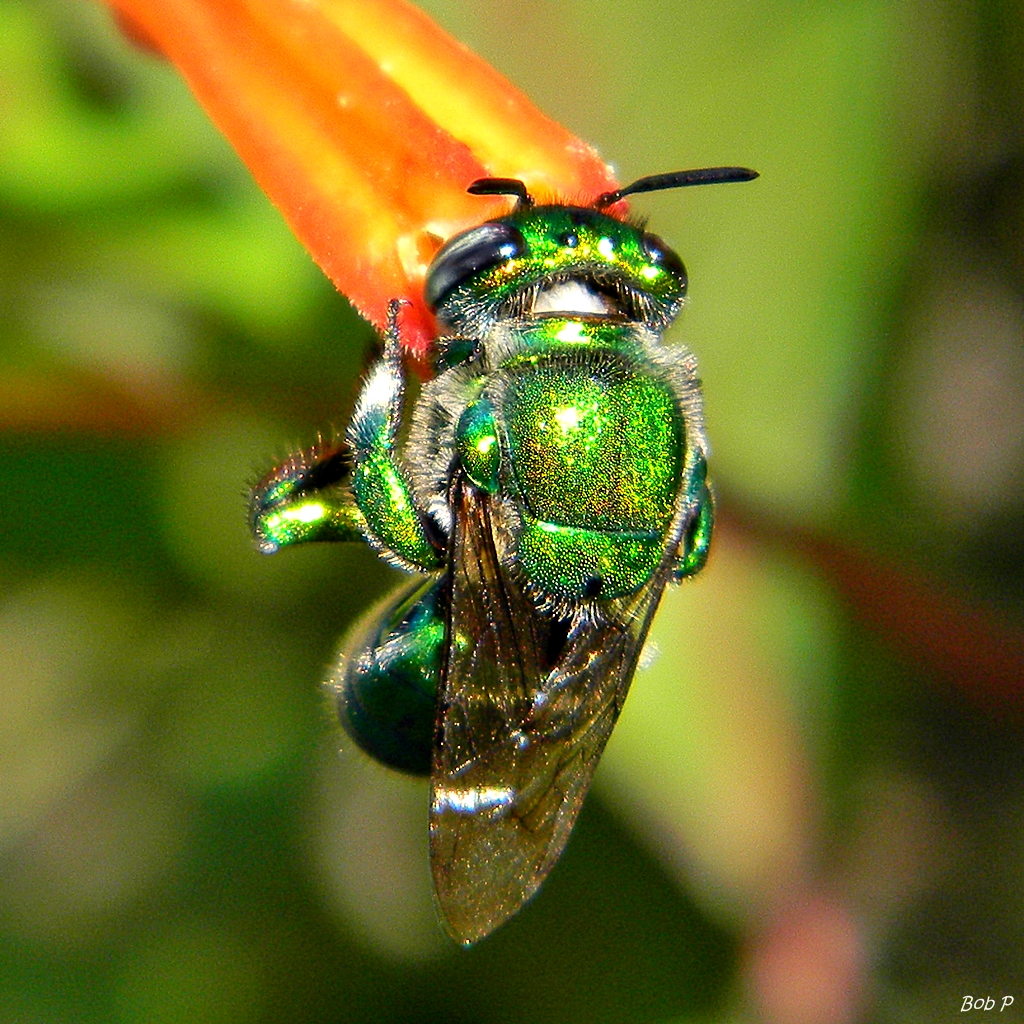
Green orchid bee gathering nectar

The native range of Euglossa dilemma is in Central America where it extends from Costa Rica to Mexico. In Florida it is thought to have originated from Mexico and arrived in the state by accident, perhaps being transported in a nest in a wooden structure such as a pallet. It was first detected in Broward County in 2003 and has since become established in Palm Beach County, Brevard County, and is expected to extend its range to most of the southern half of Florida. In its native Mexico it is found in hot dry habitats including degraded forests, pastures, parks and gardens. It is less dependent on primary forests than most Euglossine bees.

== Biology ==
Male orchid bees are specialised to visit particular species of neotropical orchid. This is a mutualistic arrangement in which the male bee benefits from gathering the fragrance ingredients supplied by the flower which he stores in his hollow hind legs, and the orchid benefits by being pollinated. The male uses the fragrances during courtship. The species of orchid with which Euglossa dilemma is associated in its Central American home range is unknown, but in its new Florida habitat, it breeds successfully without the presence of any orchid, the male visiting other species of plants to gather the ingredients for his perfume. One of these plants is basil (Ocimum basilicum) and another Stemmadenia littoralis. Rotten timber and wood oozing resin is another source of fragrances. In Florida, the female bee gathers much of the pollen she collects from Senna mexicana but also visits other plants, and nectar is collected by both sexes, predominantly from Ruellia brittoniana and Tecoma stans. This bee has also been seen feeding on Hamelia patens, Cheilocostus, Tradescantia pallida and Datura.

A female Euglossa dilemma kneading pollen (slow motion).

There may be unexpected consequences of the naturalization of these bees in the United States. For example, in a similar situation in Florida, two fig species Ficus altissima and Ficus macrophylla have been introduced but did not spread because there was no suitable pollinator. With the arrival of the non-native wasps (Eupristina sp.), the figs acquired pollinating insects and became invasive.

The male bee attracts a female by releasing his fragrance and fanning his wings to disperse it. The female builds a solitary nest out of propolis, an exudate from plants. The nest may contain up to twenty cells, in each of which she lays an egg. The female brings pollen and nectar to the nest to feed the developing larvae. Several bees may build their nests side by side but do not share the task of feeding the young.

== Notes ==
^αThe males of E. viridissima almost always have two teeth; a third may be present, but it is in a different position from the third tooth of male E. dilemma.
