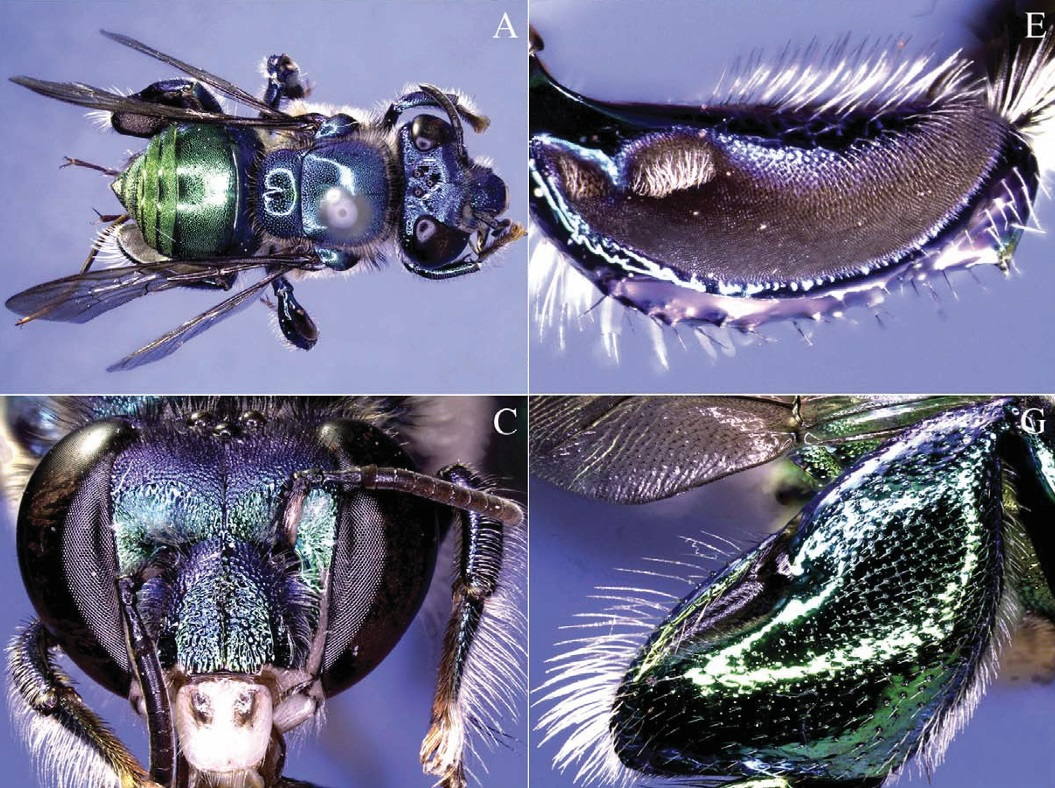
- Modified from Némesio & Ferrari, 2012, Fig. 2. Male holotype Euglossa bazinga sp. n. A: dorsal view of metasoma; C: frontal view of face; E: ventral view of mesotibia; G: metatibia.

Scientific classification
- Kingdom: Animalia
- Phylum: Arthropoda
- Clade: Pancrustacea
- Class: Insecta
- Order: Hymenoptera
- Family: Apidae
- Genus: Euglossa
- Species: E. bazinga

Binomial name
- Euglossa bazinga Nemésio & Ferrari, 2012

= Euglossa bazinga =

Species of bee

Euglossa bazinga is a euglossine bee species found in Brazil. It is named after the catchphrase of the fictional character Dr. Sheldon Cooper from the television show The Big Bang Theory. It was previously misidentified as Euglossa ignita, and is threatened with habitat loss.

== Taxonomy and naming ==
Euglossa bazinga is one of around 130 species currently identified within the orchid bee genus Euglossa. E. bazinga had previously been misidentified as Euglossa ignita. Brazilian biologists André Nemésio of the Universidade Federal de Uberlândia and Rafael R. Ferrari of the Universidade Federal de Minas Gerais identified the species as distinct, with his findings published in the December 2012 issue of the journal Zootaxa. The authors named the species in honor of the catchphrase of the character Sheldon Cooper, played by actor Jim Parsons, from the television show The Big Bang Theory. Nemésio said of the name, "Sheldon Cooper's favorite comic word 'bazinga', used by him when tricking somebody, was here chosen to represent the character. Euglossa bazinga has tricked us for some time due to its similarity to E. ignita, what led us to use 'bazinga'." Ironically, the character is allergic to bees.

== Distribution and habitat ==
Euglossa bazinga has been identified in the central and northern areas of Mato Grosso, Brazil. It is one of the few examples of its genus that occur in the Cerrado, a savanna ecosystem.

== Morphology and identification ==
Euglossa bazinga is the smallest of the Euglossa species belonging to the subgenus Glossura, but has the longest tongue in proportion to its body size. Only the male from this species is known. It can be distinguished from E. ignita males by its much smaller body size, longer extended mouthparts, bluish integumental coloration, shape and the area between the second sternal tufts and the shape and size of the mesotibial tufts.

== See also ==
- Bazinga (cnidarian), a monotypic genus of jellyfish
