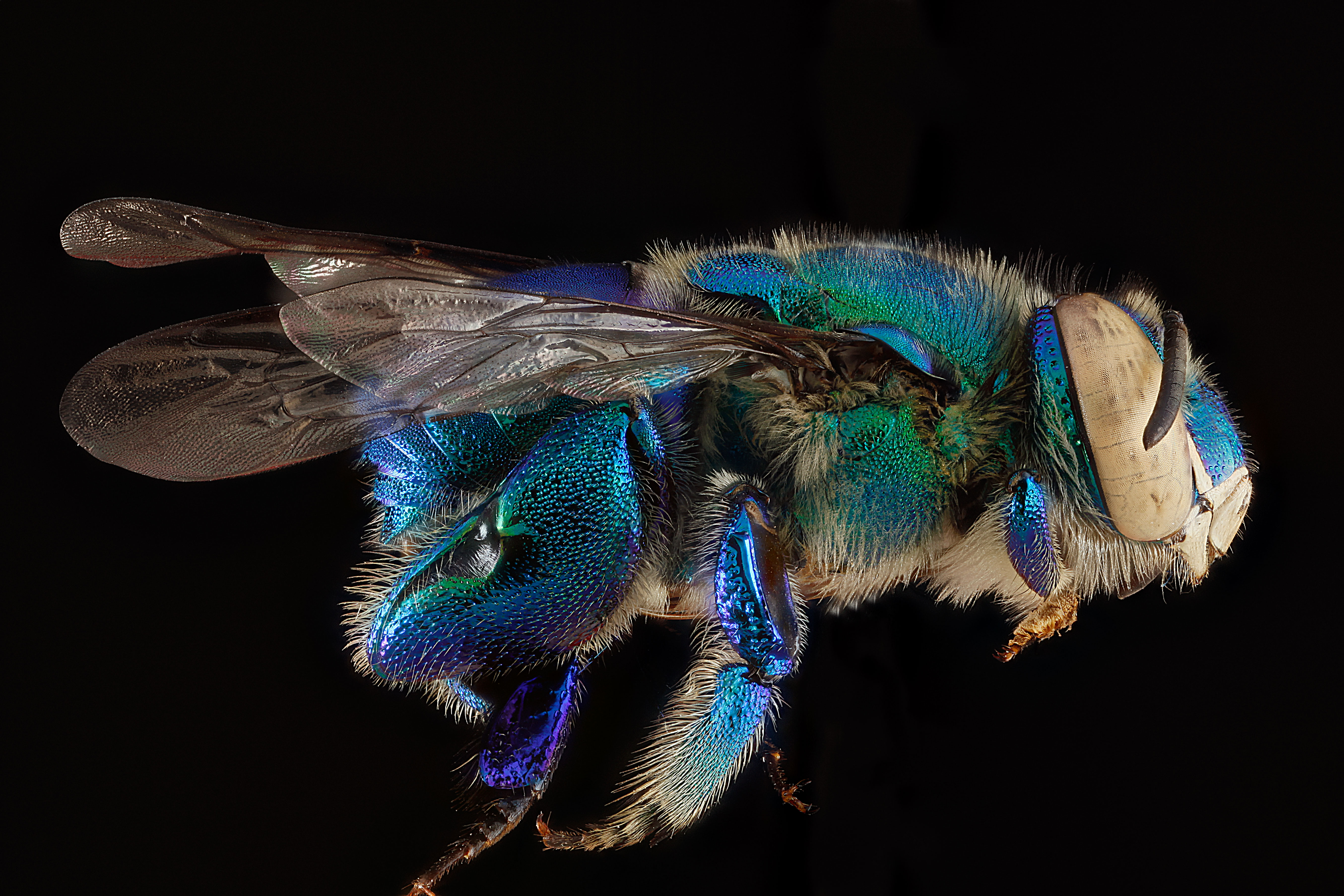
- Euglossa viridissima male

Scientific classification
- Domain: Eukaryota
- Kingdom: Animalia
- Phylum: Arthropoda
- Class: Insecta
- Order: Hymenoptera
- Family: Apidae
- Genus: Euglossa
- Species: E. viridissima

Binomial name
- Euglossa viridissima Friese, 1899

= Euglossa viridissima =

Species of bee

Euglossa viridissima is a species of orchid bee native to Central America, historically confused with a cryptic sister species, Euglossa dilemma. Like its sister species, E. viridissima is one of dozens of species in the genus with bright metallic blue-green coloration, in addition to long mouthparts which extend below their bodies, though its range extends farther north than any congeners.

== Morphology ==
Members of E. viridissima are described as being medium sized, having bright metallic green coloration, and long proboscis. Males of this species can always be identified by having two large patches of hair on their second sternite, and the unique shape of mid-tibial hair tufts. It is believed that these hair patches aid in collection and creation of perfumes, which are used for mating. Bees belonging to E. viridissima may be uniquely identified from E. dilemma via the appearance of their mandibles. Members of E. dilemma will always have mandibles with three "teeth" which are evenly spaced apart. Members of E. viridissima will have mandibles with either two or three "teeth." Individuals with three teeth will have uneven spacing between each tooth, differentiating them from members of E. dilemma.

== Distribution and habitat ==
Amongst euglossines, E. viridissima is reported to have the northern most range within North America. E. viridissima has been observed in western Puerto Rico and the Yucatan Peninsula. While E. viridissima is most common in this range, E. viridissima has also been observed in parts of Florida and the Baja California Peninsula.

=== Arrival to the United States ===
Historically, E. viridissima has been observed south of the Gulf of Mexico, and towards northern South America. Most commonly, near the Yucatan Peninsula. Previously, it was believed that these bees would be restricted to this area, as the southern United States is outside the male bee's flight range. Additionally, it was believed that members of E. viridissima would be reliant upon their host orchids, preventing them from leaving. The current consensus is that members of E. viridissima were accidentally transported through trade. An inactive nest, or egg-bearing female may have stowed away on a cargo ship, which allowed E. viridissima to establish itself within southern Florida and spread further.

=== Establishment within the United States ===
Over time, members of E. viridissima have gradually radiated west, towards California. As this species is quite bright and colorful, it leads scientists to believe that it has only recently arrived and established itself within the United States. Due to its appearance, it is incredibly likely that this species would have been observed and noted much earlier in record. However, the fast establishment of this species of bee speaks towards the current abilities of American bee species. Whether due to changes in climate, or the plausibility of E. viridissima's nature as an invasive species, native species are losing their ability to maintain their niche and declining in population.

== Behavior ==
Members of E. viridissima are semi-eusocial, and represent what may be the possible first step towards eusociality within bees. Females of this species may sometimes be eusocial, and other times will not express eusociality. Whereas males of this species will leave the nest and never return once they reach maturity. The eusociality of females has many factors which may depend on seasonality, age of the female, and nest status.

=== Nesting ===
E. viridissima create their nests within burrows, small holes, or dens within the ground. The nests of E. viridissima are somewhat unique as once a nest has been used, it is abandoned, and may be reused again by the next generation. Typically, nests are created by a single female. Once the nest has been created, the female will forage, maintain the nest, tend to the brood, and defend the nest by herself. However, after this first nesting cycle, there is a chance for the nest to be reused. Typically, if a nest is being reused, it is by the original mother that created the nest. During this second cycle, the mother will enlist the aid of her daughters, who will take on the role of defending the nest and foraging. In the second cycle, the mother will almost never leave the nest, and will devote nearly all of her time to tending to the brood. The daughters may change roles with each other depending on social conditions, ability to defend the nest, or available energy.

==== Seasonality ====
Eusociality and aggressiveness may be affected within E. viridissima depending upon what season a nest is built in. A lack of nest materials, which may be seen during dry seasons, cause females to raid other nests in search of resins. Whereas rainy seasons may cause females to raid nests for food and brood, while also destroying other nests or completely taking them over. Typically, nest occupation will be higher in rainy seasons than in the dry season. During rainy seasons there is also an increased rate of nest creation for E. viridissima. This suggests that reasons for aggression within E. viridissima changes depending on material availability.

==== Effectiveness of eusociality ====
Observations of eusociality within E. viridissima has shown that social nests tend to produce more offspring overall, larger nests and broods, and more males. Non-social nests tend to be smaller, have greater rates of failure, and produce slightly more females than males. Additionally, when daughters are present to act as a guard, rates of theft from nests decreases significantly. When there are no daughters present, intruders are always able to enter the nest and are able to steal from the nest over 75% of the time. Conversely, when daughters are present, intruders are able to enter approximately 50% of the time, but are only able to steal 11% of the time.

== See also ==
Video of E. viridissima hovering and collecting scents in Panama: https://www.youtube.com/watch?v=7-o73aUimoc
