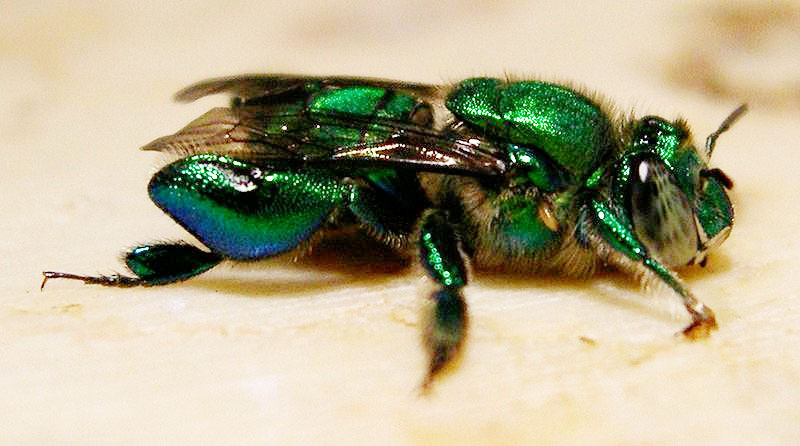
- Male of unidentified Euglossa species
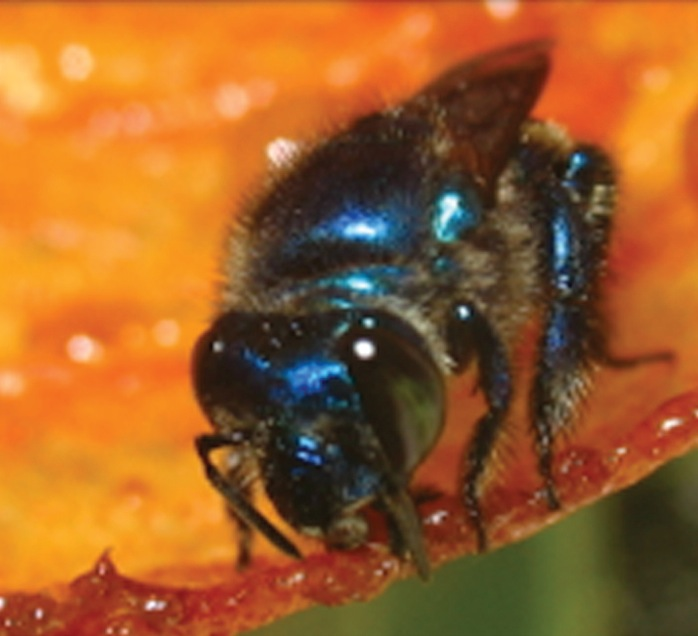
- Female E. hyacinthina

Scientific classification
- Kingdom: Animalia
- Phylum: Arthropoda
- Class: Insecta
- Order: Hymenoptera
- Family: Apidae
- Tribe: Euglossini
- Genus: Euglossa; Latreille, 1802

Diversity
- > 110 species

= Euglossa =

Genus of bees

Euglossa is a genus of orchid bees (Euglossini). Like all their close relatives, they are native to the Neotropics; an introduced population exists in Florida. They are typically bright metallic blue, green, coppery, or golden.

Euglossa intersecta (formerly known as E. brullei) is morphologically and chromatically atypical for the genus, and resembles the related Eufriesea in a number of characters including coloration.

== Distribution ==
Euglossa occurs naturally from Mexico to Paraguay, northern Argentina, western Brazil, Jamaica, and Trinidad and Tobago, but one species (E. dilemma) has recently been introduced to Florida in the United States

== Species ==
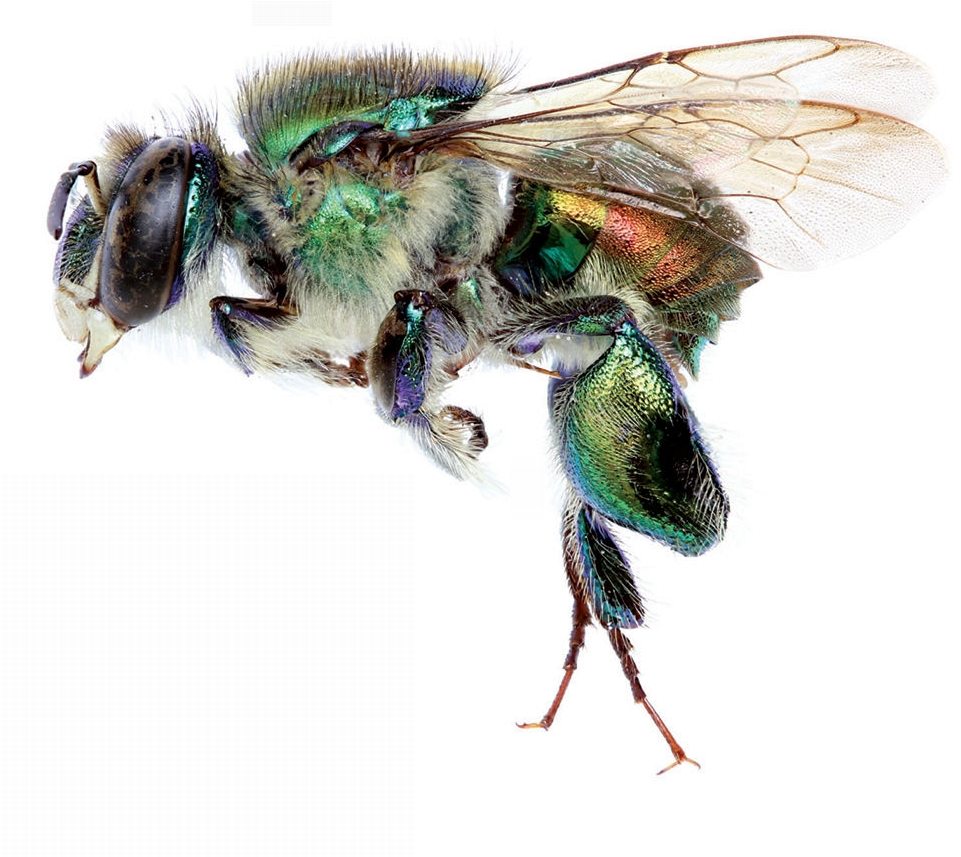
Euglossa villosa

- E. adiastola Hinojosa-Díaz, Nemésio & Engel, 2012
- E. alleni Moure, 1968
- E. allosticta Moure, 1969
- E. amazonica Dressler, 1982
- E. analis Westwood, 1840
- E. annectans Dressler, 1982
- E. anodorhynchi Nemésio, 2005
- E. asarophora Moure & Sakagami, 1969
- E. ashei Hinojosa-Díaz & Engel, 2014
- E. atroveneta Dressler, 1978
- E. augaspis Dressler, 1982
- E. aurantia Hinojosa-Díaz & Engel, 2011
- E. aureiventris Friese, 1899
- E. auriventris Friese, 1925
- E. azurea Ducke, 1902
- E. bazinga Nemesio, 2013
- E. bidentata Dressler, 1982
- E. bigibba Dressler, 1982
- E. bursigera Moure, 1970
- E. celiae Hinojosa-Díaz & Engel, 2014
- E. cetera Hinojosa-Díaz & Engel, 2014
- E. chalybeata Friese, 1925
- E. championi Cheesman, 1929
- E. chlorina Dressler, 1982
- E. clausi Nemésio & Engel, 2012
- E. cognata Moure, 1970
- E. cordata (Linnaeus, 1758)
- E. cosmodora Hinojosa-Díaz & Engel, 2007
- E. cotylisca Hinojosa-Díaz & Engel, 2007
- E. crassipunctata Moure, 1968
- E. crininota Dressler, 1978
- E. cupella Hinojosa-Díaz & Engel, 2014
- E. cyanea Friese, 1899
- E. cyanochlora Moure, 1995
- E. cyanura Cockerell, 1917
- E. cybelia Moure, 1968
- E. deceptrix Moure, 1968
- E. decorata Smith, 1874
- E. despecta Moure, 1968
- E. dilemma Bembé & Eltz, 2011
- E. dissimula Dressler, 1978
- E. dodsoni Moure, 1965
- E. dressleri Moure, 1968
- E. embera Hinojosa-Díaz, Nemésio & Engel, 2012
- E. erythrochlora Moure, 1968
- E. fimbriata Rebêlo & Moure, 1995
- E. flammea Moure, 1969
- E. fuscifrons Dressler, 1982
- E. gibbosa Dressler, 1982
- E. gorgonensis Cheesman, 1929
- E. granti Cheesman, 1929
- E. hansoni Moure, 1965
- E. hemichlora Cockerell, 1917
- E. heterosticta Moure, 1968
- E. hugonis Moure, 1989
- E. hyacinthina Dressler, 1982
- E. ignita Smith, 1874
- E. igniventris Friese, 1925
- E. imperialis Cockerell, 1922
- E. inflata Roubik, 2004
- E. intersecta Latreille, 1838
- E. iopoecila Dressler, 1982
- E. ioprosopa Dressler, 1982
- E. iopyrrha Dressler, 1982
- E. jacquelynae Nemésio, 2007
- E. jamaicensis Moure, 1968
- E. laevicincta Dressler, 1982
- E. lazulina Friese, 1923
- E. leucotricha Rebêlo & Moure, 1995
- E. liopoda Dressler, 1982
- E. lugubris Roubik, 2004
- E. macrorhyncha Dressler, 1982
- E. maculilabris Moure, 1968
- E. magnipes Dressler, 1982
- E. mandibularis Friese, 1899
- E. marianae Nemésio, 2011
- E. melanotricha Moure, 1967
- E. micans Dressler, 1978
- E. milenae Bembé, 2007
- E. mixta Friese, 1899
- E. modestior Dressler, 1982
- E. monnei Nemesio, 2012
- E. moratoi
- E. moronei Engel, 1999
- E. mourei Dressler, 1982
- E. nigropilosa Moure, 1965
- E. nigrosignata Moure, 1969
- E. obrima Hinojosa-Díaz, Melo & Engel, 2011
- E. obtusa Dressler, 1978
- E. occidentalis Roubik, 2004
- E. oleolucens Dressler, 1978
- E. orellana Roubik, 2004
- E. paisa Ramírez, 2005
- E. parvula Dressler, 1982
- E. pepei Nemésio & Engel, 2012
- E. perfulgens Moure, 1967
- E. perpulchra Moure & Schlindwein, 2002
- E. perviridis Dressler, 1985
- E. pictipennis Moure, 1943
- E. piliventris Guérin-Méneville, 1845
- E. platymera Dressler, 1982
- E. pleosticta Dressler, 1982
- E. polita Ducke, 1902
- E. prasina Dressler, 1982
- E. purpurea Friese, 1899
- E. retroviridis Dressler, 1982
- E. rufipes Rasmussen & Skov, 2006
- E. rugilabris Moure, 1967
- E. samperi Ramírez, 2006
- E. sapphirina Moure, 1968
- E. securigera Dressler, 1982
- E. singularis Mocsáry, 1899
- E. solangeae Nemésio, 2007
- E. sovietica Nemésio, 2007
- E. stellfeldi Moure, 1947
- E. stilbonata Dressler, 1982
- E. subandina Hinojosa-Díaz & Engel, 2014
- E. tiputini Roubik, 2004
- E. townsendi Cockerell, 1904
- E. tridentata Moure, 1970
- E. trinotata Dressler, 1982
- E. truncata Rebêlo & Moure, 1995
- E. turbinifex Dressler, 1978
- E. urarina Hinojosa-Díaz & Engel, 2007
- E. variabilis Friese, 1899
- E. villosa Moure, 1968
- E. villosiventris Moure, 1968
- E. violaceifrons Rebêlo & Moure, 1995
- E. viridifrons Dressler, 1982
- E. viridis (Perty, 1833)
- E. viridissima Friese, 1899
- E. williamsi Hinojosa-Díaz & Engel, 2011

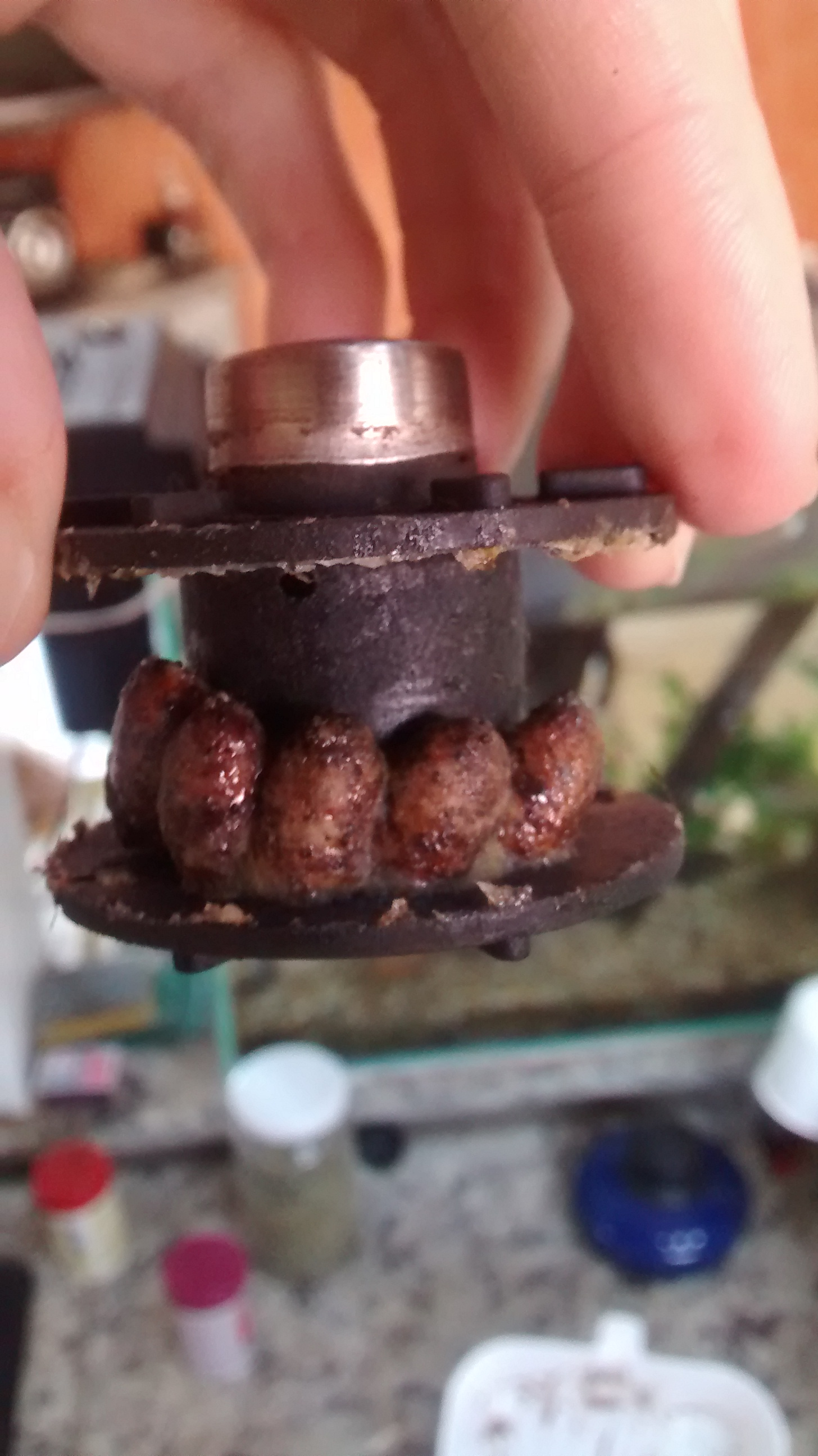
Eggs (inside cells) laid by a solitary bee in a gardening equipment: Wax can be seen in the edges.
