= Euglossa bidentata =

Scientific classification
- Domain: Eukaryota
- Kingdom: Animalia
- Phylum: Arthropoda
- Class: Insecta
- Order: Hymenoptera
- Family: Apidae
- Genus: Euglossa
- Species: E. bidentata

Binomial name
- Euglossa bidentata Dressler, 1982

Species of bee

Euglossa bidentata is a Euglossine bee species found in the Amazon rainforest.
