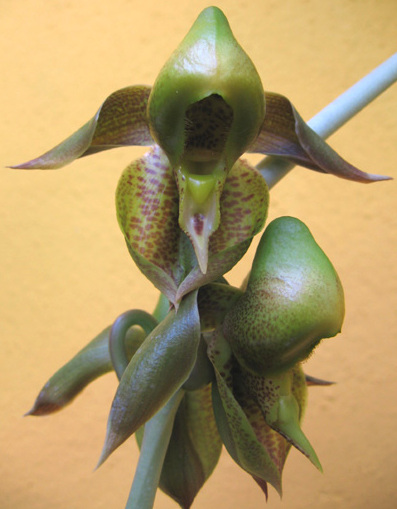

Scientific classification
- Kingdom: Plantae
- Clade: Tracheophytes
- Clade: Angiosperms
- Clade: Monocots
- Order: Asparagales
- Family: Orchidaceae
- Subfamily: Epidendroideae
- Genus: Catasetum
- Species: C. maculatum

Binomial name
- Catasetum maculatum Kunth (1822)

Synonyms
- Catasetum oerstedii Rchb.f. (1855); Catasetum rostratum Klinge (1899); Catasetum brenesii Schltr. (1923)

= Catasetum maculatum =

Species of orchid

Catasetum maculatum, the spotted catasetum, is a species of orchid found from Central America to Venezuela. The flowers are dimorphic, and the male and female flowers look so different that they were originally thought to be two separate species. A few days after opening, the male flowers emit a strong odor, which serves to attract bees.

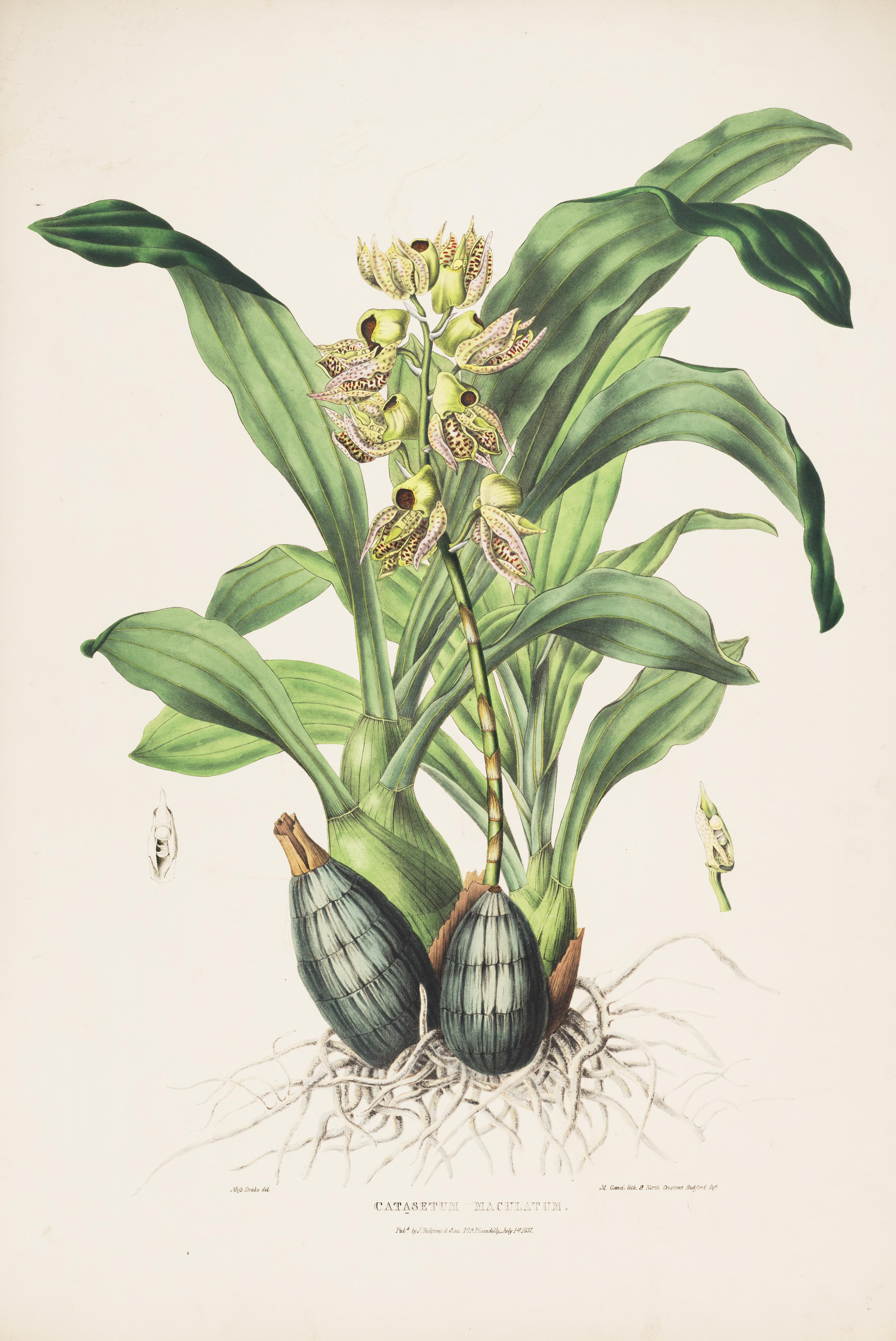
Illustration of species.
