= BaZnGa =

Ternary compound inspired by sitcom The Big Bang Theory

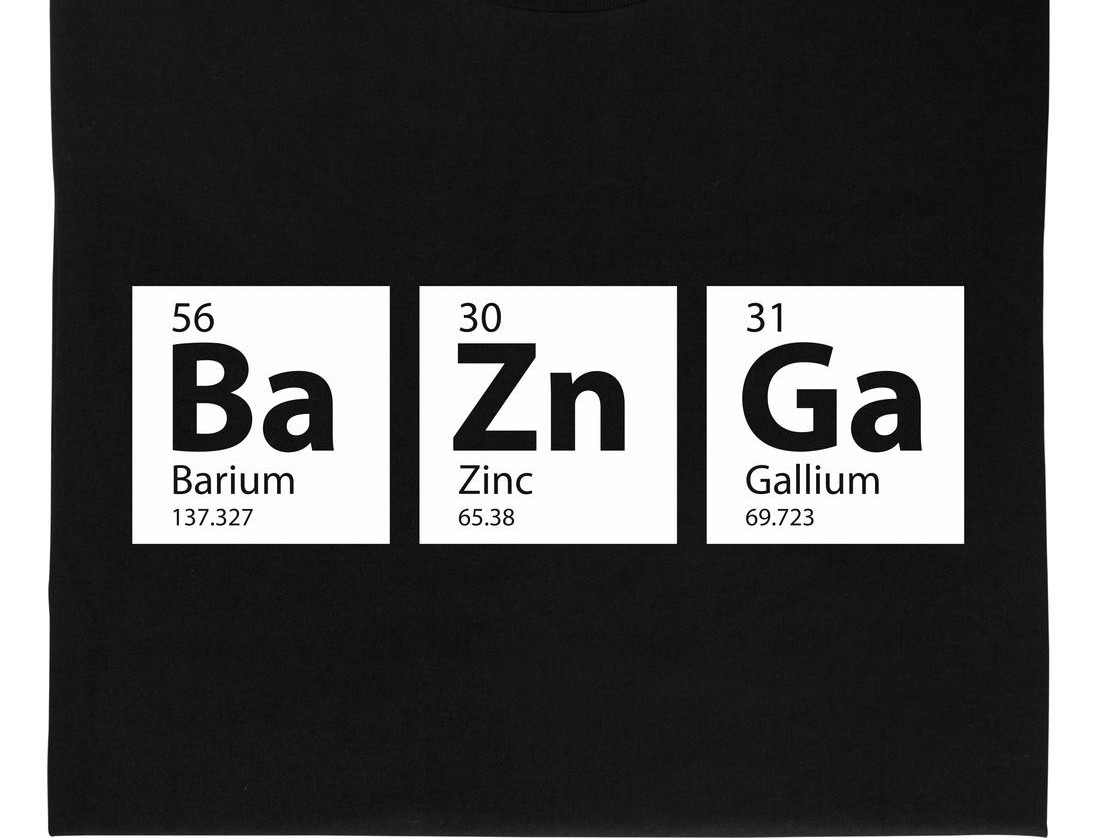
BaZnGa T-shirt design

BaZnGa (barium zinc gallide) is a ternary compound of barium, zinc, and gallium that was inspired by the saying "Bazinga!" from Sheldon Cooper on The Big Bang Theory television series. It is a poor metal. BaZnGa crystals can be grown by adding gallium to a BaZn eutectic at 800° C and then cooling to 400 °C. Hot liquid BaZn is hard to handle because zinc vapourises and barium reacts with air. Next, centrifuging filtration removes the crystals of BaZnGa from the liquid BaZn. The crystals have space group I4/mmm tI36 with a=6.3652 and c=25.593 Å. The unit cell volume is 1036.9 Å^{3}, with 12 formula units per cell. The electrical resistivity at room temperature is 2.5×10^{−4} Ohm·cm.

Various merchandise has been produced with periodic table like entries of Ba, Zn, and Ga, including clothing and mugs.

A substance with a similar looking formula BaZnGa_{10}O_{17}, a barium zinc gallate, is a barium ion conductor.
