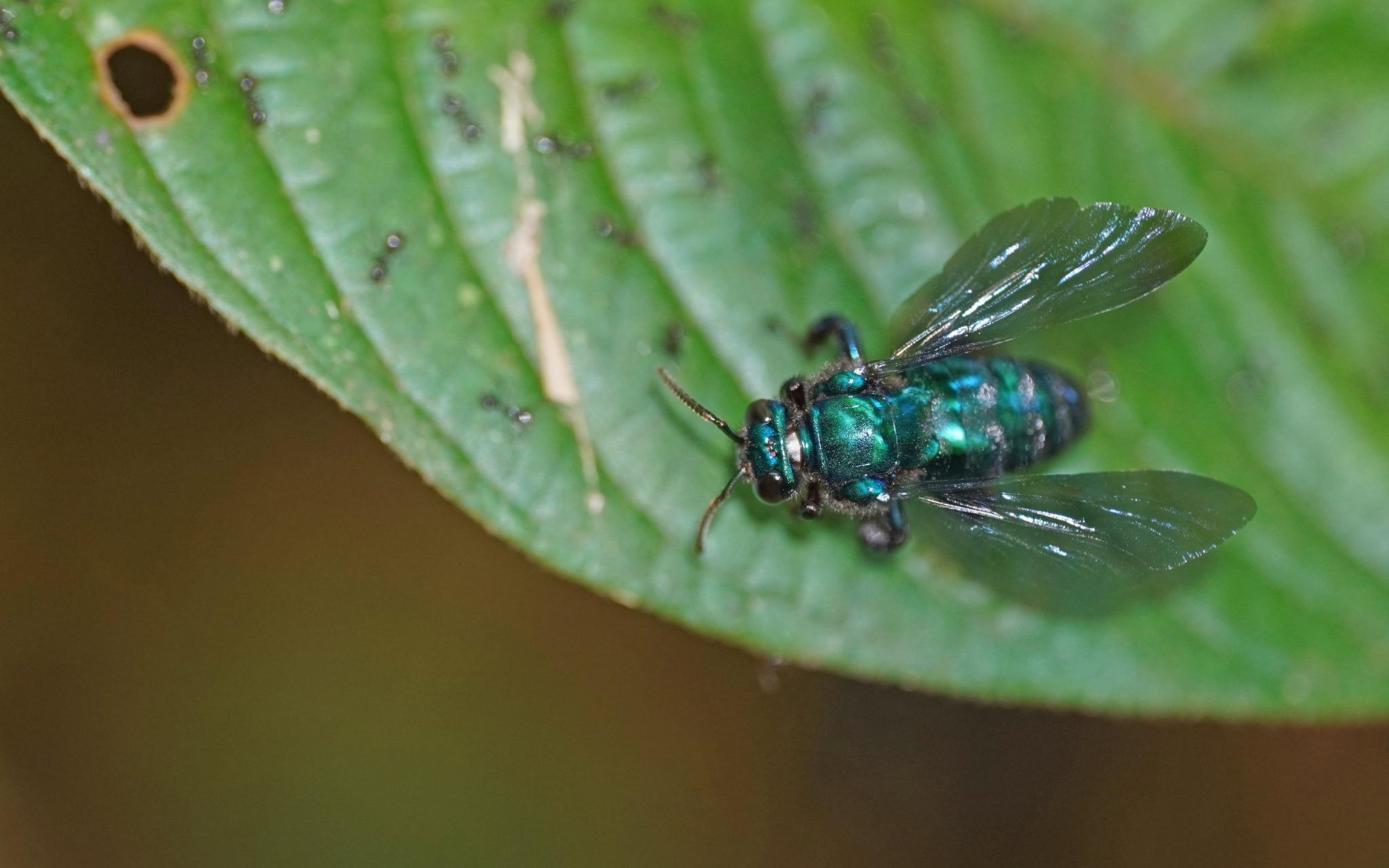
- In Peru

Scientific classification
- Kingdom: Animalia
- Phylum: Arthropoda
- Class: Insecta
- Order: Hymenoptera
- Family: Apidae
- Tribe: Euglossini
- Genus: Aglae; Lepeletier & Serville, 1825
- Species: A. caerulea

Binomial name
- Aglae caerulea Lepeletier & Serville, 1825

Synonyms
- Aglae coerulea Lepeletier & Serville, 1825 (Missp.)

= Aglae =

Genus of bees

Aglae is a genus of euglossine bees, with the only described species Aglae caerulea. Like all orchid bees, it is restricted to the Neotropics. They are metallic blue. This species, like the genus Exaerete, is a nest parasite on free-living Euglossini. A. caerulea lays its eggs in the nests of Eulaema nigrita, and possibly other Eulaema species.

Among other substances, males of this species are attracted by methyl cinnamate baits.

== Name ==
The Ancient Greek, Αγλαιη means "beauty". The original 1825 publication describing the species spelled the epithet as "cœrulea" (for "blue"), which nearly all subsequent authors misspelled as caerulea rather than coerulea, but under Article 33.3.1 of the ICZN, the caerulea spelling must be maintained. (Note: ICZN Code "33.3.1. when an incorrect subsequent spelling is in prevailing usage and is attributed to the publication of the original spelling, the subsequent spelling and attribution are to be preserved and the spelling is deemed to be a correct original spelling.")

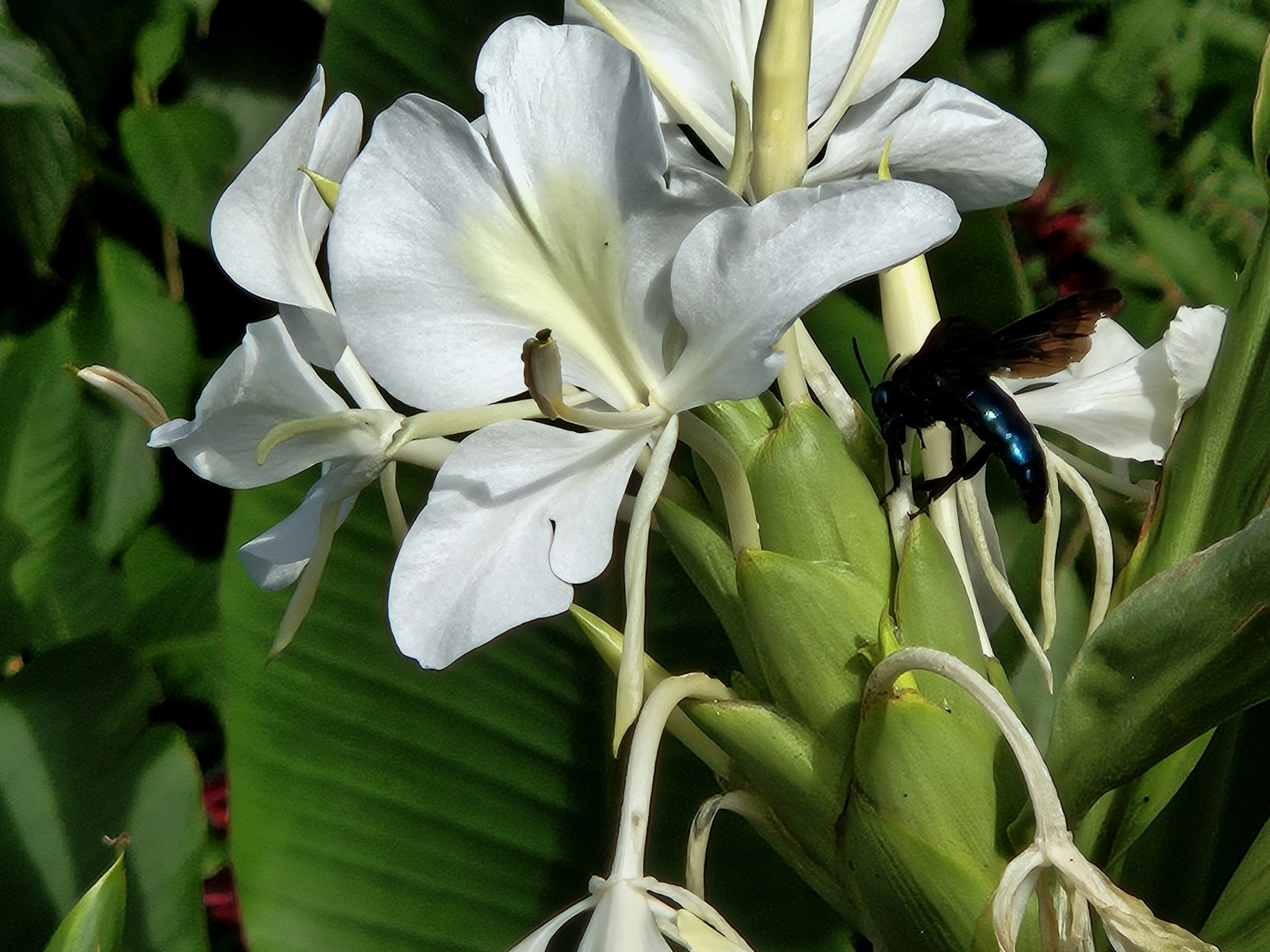
In Ecuador

== Distribution ==
A. caerulea was thought to occur only in the Amazon basin, in the rainforests of northern Bolivia, western Colombia, Ecuador, French Guiana, Guyana, Peru, Venezuela, Suriname, and Panama. However, the record from Panama is doubtful. Recent studies have extended the range by about 2,400 km southwards, when specimens were found in the National Park Chapada dos Guimarães, Mato Grosso, Brazil.
