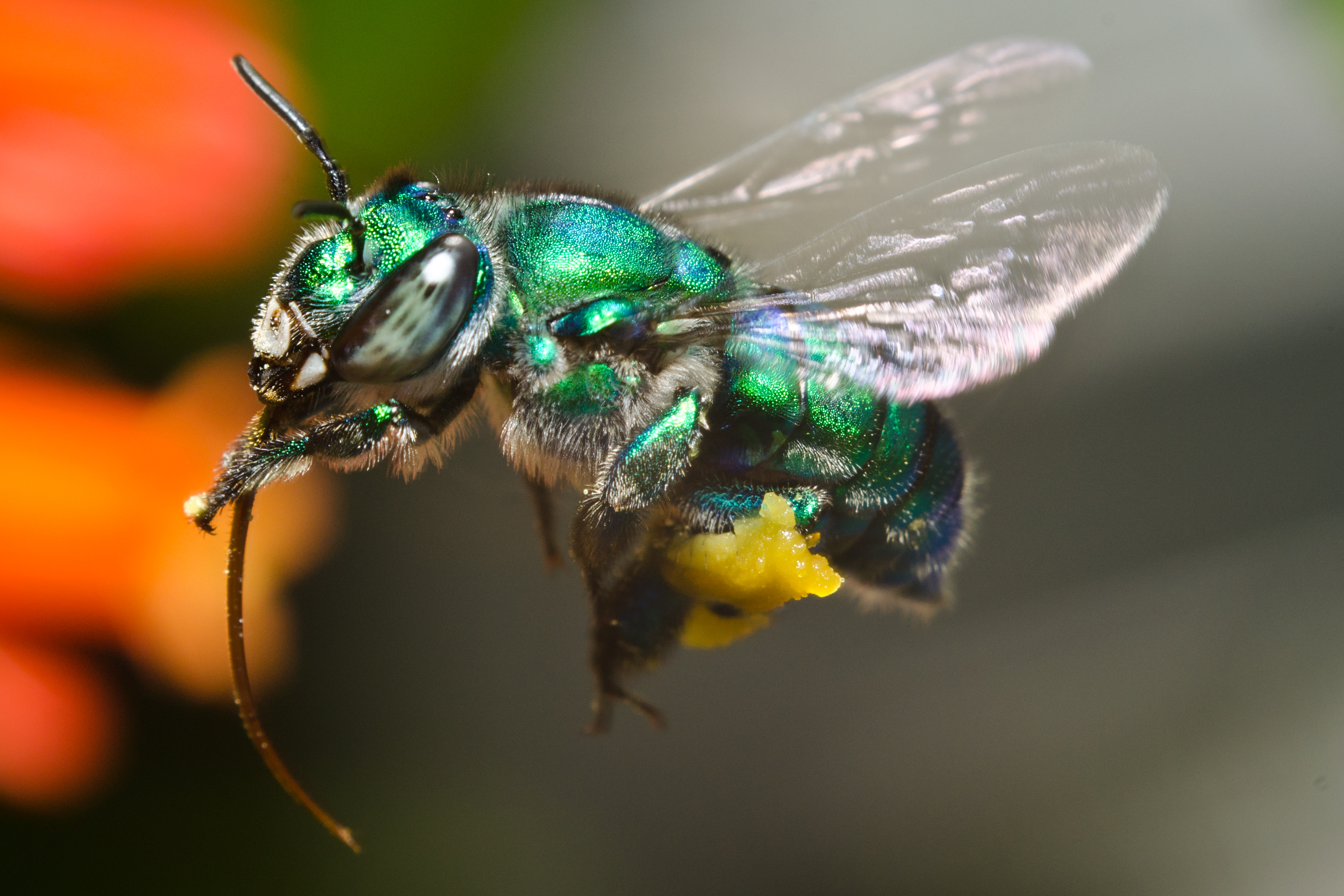
- female Euglossa (carrying pollen)

Scientific classification
- Kingdom: Animalia
- Phylum: Arthropoda
- Clade: Pancrustacea
- Class: Insecta
- Order: Hymenoptera
- Family: Apidae
- Clade: Corbiculata
- Tribe: Euglossini; Latreille, 1802

Genera
- Aglae; Euglossa; Eulaema; Eufriesea; Exaerete

Diversity
- c. 200 species

= Euglossini =

Tribe of bees

The tribe Euglossini, in the subfamily Apinae, commonly known as orchid bees or euglossine bees, are the only group of corbiculate bees whose non-parasitic members do not all possess eusocial behavior.

== Description, distribution, and behavior ==
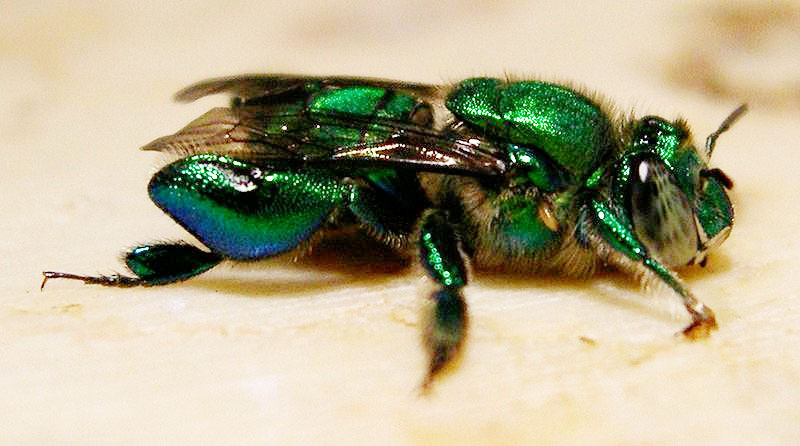
Male Euglossa sp.

Most of the tribe's species are solitary, though a few are communal, or exhibit simple forms of eusociality. There are about 200 described species, distributed in five genera: Euglossa, Eulaema, Eufriesea, Exaerete and the monotypic Aglae. All species occur in South or Central America, though one species, Euglossa dilemma, has become established in Florida in the United States, and species of Eulaema and Eufriesea have been reported from Arizona and Texas, respectively. The genera Exaerete and Aglae are kleptoparasites in the nests of other orchid bees. All except Eulaema are characterized by brilliant metallic coloration, primarily green, gold, and blue.

Females gather pollen and nectar as food from a variety of plants, and resins, mud and other materials for nest building. Some of the same food plants are also used by the males, which leave the nest upon hatching and do not return.

=== Fragrance collection ===
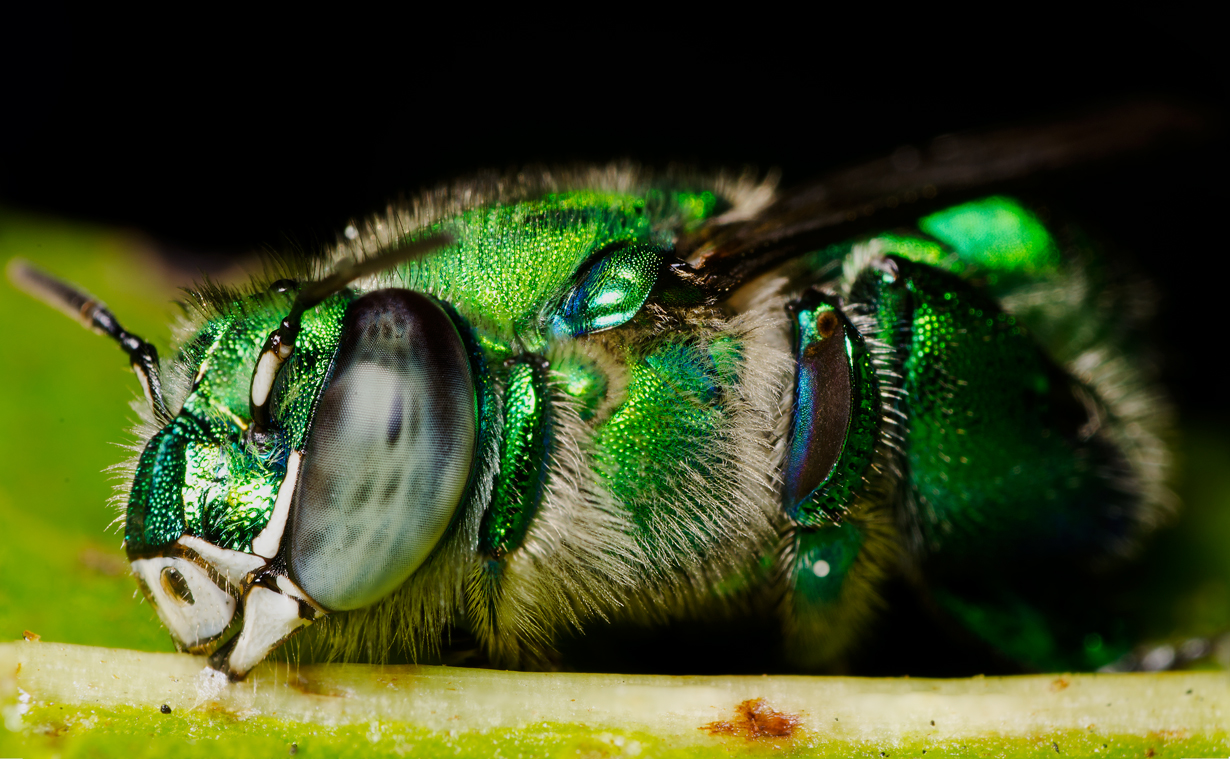
The special fragrance collection organs are seen on the large hind legs of this Euglossa viridissima as it sleeps on a leaf

Male orchid bees have uniquely modified legs which are used to collect and store different volatile compounds (often esters) throughout their lives, primarily from orchids in the subtribes Stanhopeinae and Catasetinae, where all species are exclusively pollinated by euglossine males. These orchids do not produce nectar, and hide the pollen on a single anther under an anther cap; orchids are not visited by females, as females require both nectar and pollen as food provisions for their offspring, and visit other types of plants to obtain these resources. The whole pollinarium becomes attached to the male as it leaves the flower. Several flowers from other plant families are also visited by the bees: Spathiphyllum and Anthurium (Araceae), Drymonia and Gloxinia (Gesneriaceae), Cyphomandra (Solanaceae), and Dalechampia (Euphorbiaceae) contain one or more species that attract male euglossines.

The chemicals are picked up using special brushes on the forelegs, transferred from there by rubbing the brushes against combs on the middle legs, and finally these combs are pressed into grooves on the dorsal edge of the hind legs, squeezing the chemicals past the waxy hairs which block the opening of the groove, and into a sponge-like cavity inside the hind tibia.

The accumulated "fragrances" are evidently released by the males at their display sites in the forest understory, where matings are known to take place. The accumulated volatiles were long believed to be used by males as a pheromone to attract females; however, female attraction to male odors or to orchid fragrances has never been demonstrated in behavioral experiments. Instead, it is now thought that the function of the male odors is to signal male 'genetic quality' to females, because great effort must be expended by males to collect orchid fragrances and thus only the most fit males could gather complex odor mixes. This would constitute an unusual example of Zahavi's handicap principle, analogous to the male peacock's tail. The relationship between male euglossine bees and volatile chemicals is essentially unique in the animal kingdom.

Scientists use single synthetic compounds as bait to attract and collect males for study; among them are many familiar flavorings and odors considered appealing to humans (e.g., methyl salicylate, eugenol, cineole, benzyl acetate, methyl benzoate, methyl cinnamate), and others which are not (e.g., skatole).

It is also important to note that resource 'hot spots' wax and wane throughout the year as plants bloom and die, largely due to temporal changes, particularly between the changing of seasons. This often shifts euglossine bee preferences for certain chemicals over others. For Euglossa imperialis, studies have shown that there is a significant trend in chemical preference for cineole during later times in the year as opposed to methyl salicylate. In the local fragrance environment, a shift in the wind direction is another factor which may also cause another fragrance 'hot spot' to be included in the odor plume for euglossine bees.

Neotropical orchids themselves often exhibit elaborate adaptations involving highly specific placement of pollen packets (pollinia) on the bodies of the male orchid bees; the specificity of their placement ensures that cross-pollination only occurs between orchids of the same species. Different orchid bee males are attracted to different chemicals, so there is also some specificity regarding which orchid bees visit which types of orchid. The early description of this pollination system was by Charles Darwin, though at the time, he believed the bees were females. Not all orchids utilize euglossines as pollen vectors, of course; among the other types of insects exploited are other types of bees, wasps, flies, ants, and moths.

The male of Eufriesea purpurata is highly unusual among insects in seeking out and collecting large quantities of insecticide. Dressler (1967) discovered E. purpurata collecting aldrin and Roberts (1982) observed them collecting DDT in huge amounts from houses in Brazil, amounting to several percent of the bee's weight, without suffering any harm from the activity.
