= Hymenoptera in the 10th edition of Systema Naturae =

In the 10th edition of Systema Naturae, Carl Linnaeus classified the arthropods, including insects, arachnids and crustaceans, among his class "Insecta". Insects with membranous wings, including bees, wasps and ants were brought together under the name Hymenoptera.

== Cynips (gall wasps) ==
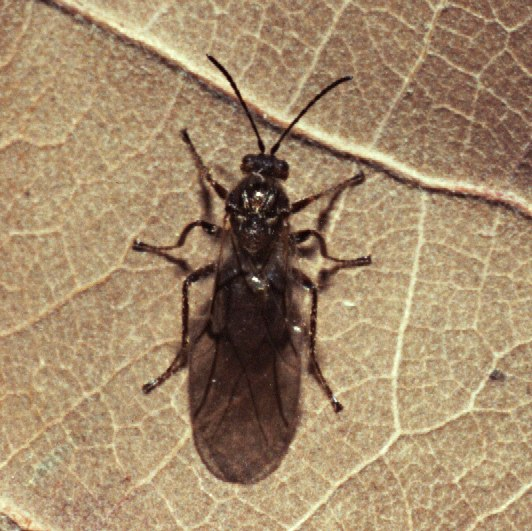
The gall wasp Cynips quercusfolii was named Cynips quercus folii in 1758.

- Cynips rosae – Diplolepis rosae
- Cynips hieracii – Aulacidea hieracii
- Cynips glechomae – Liposthenes glechomae
- Cynips quercus baccarum – Neuroterus quercusbaccarum
- Cynips quercus folii – Cynips quercusfolii
- Cynips quercus petioli
- Cynips quercus pedunculi
- Cynips quercus gemmae
- Cynips fagi
- Cynips viminalis
- Cynips salicis strobili
- Cynips amerinae – Euura amerinae
- Cynips psenes – Blastophaga psenes
- Cynips sycomori – Sycophaga sycomori

== Tenthredo (sawflies) ==
(Note: The current identities of Linnaeus' Tenthredo species are taken from the Hymenoptera Name Server.)

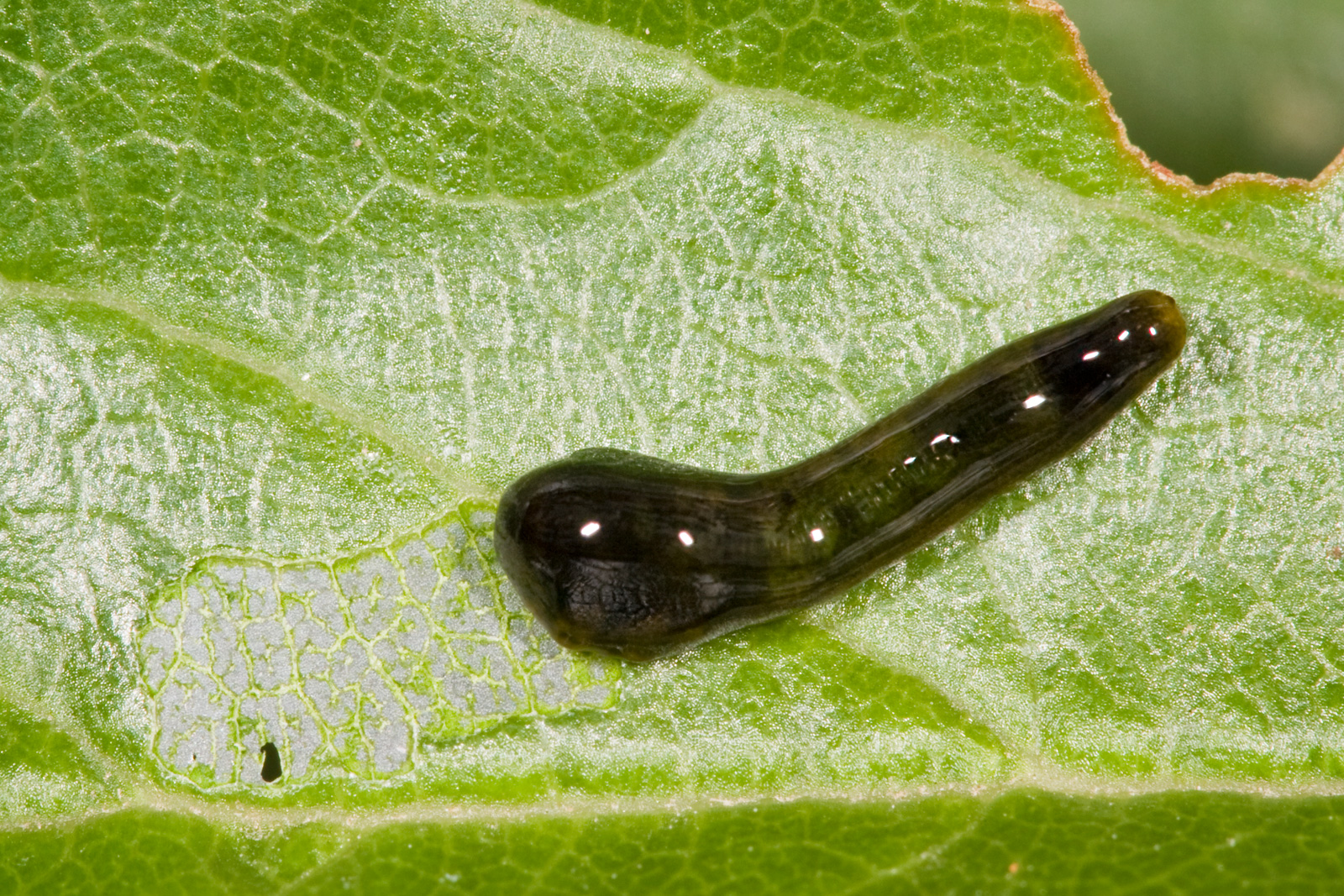
The cherry slug is the larva of Caliroa cerasi, which Linnaeus named Tenthredo cerasi in 1758.

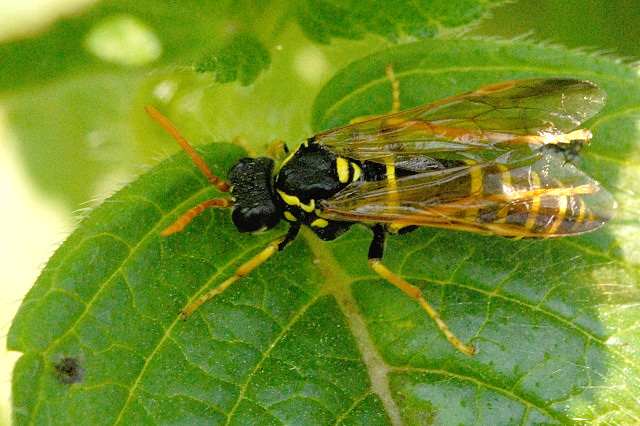
Tenthredo scrophulariae was named in 1758.

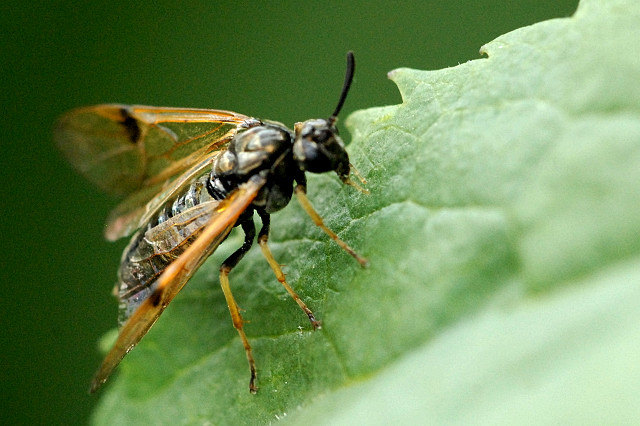
Arge rustica was named Tenthredo rustica in 1758.

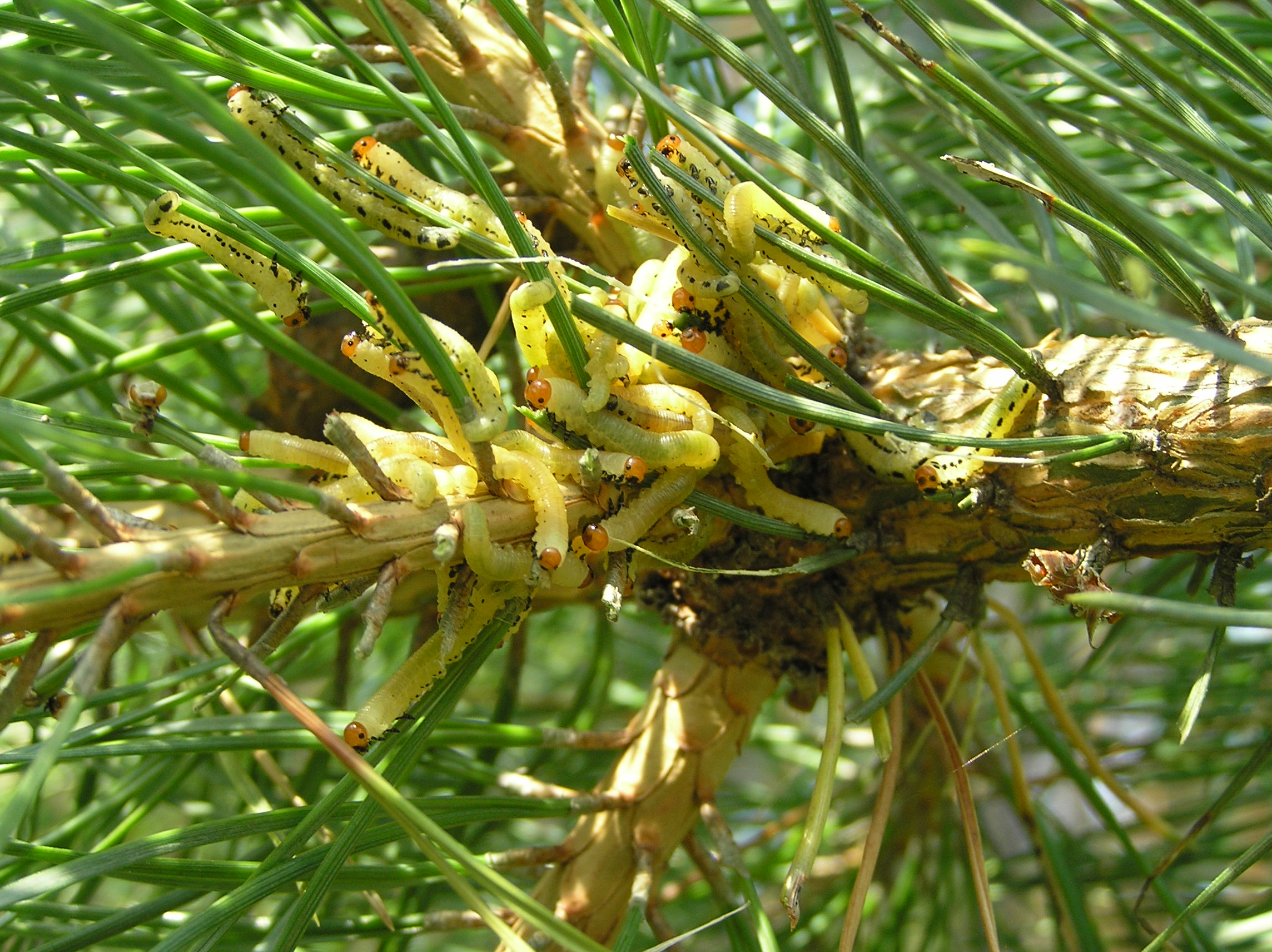
The pine sawfly Diprion pini was named Tenthredo pini in 1758.

- Tenthredo femorata – Cimbex femoratus
- Tenthredo lutea – Cimbex luteus
- Tenthredo amerinae – Pseudoclavellaria amerinae
- Tenthredo lucorum – Trichiosoma lucorum
- Tenthredo fasciata – Abia fasciata
- Tenthredo americana – Incalia americana
- Tenthredo nitens – Abia nitens
- Tenthredo pini – Diprion pini
- Tenthredo juniperi – Monoctenus juniperi
- Tenthredo ustulata – Arge ustulata
- Tenthredo rustica – Arge rustica
- Tenthredo scrophulariae
- Tenthredo pratensis – Dolerus pratensis
- Tenthredo cerasi – Caliroa cerasi
- Tenthredo salicis – Nematus salicis
- Tenthredo mesomela
- Tenthredo rufipes – Macrophya rufipes
- Tenthredo campestris
- Tenthredo atra – Tenthredella atra
- Tenthredo viridis – Rhogogaster viridis
- Tenthredo rosae – Athalia rosae
- Tenthredo cincta – Allantus cinctus
- Tenthredo livida
- Tenthredo septentrionalis – Craesus septentrionalis
- Tenthredo 12-punctata – Macrophya duodecimpunctata
- Tenthredo erythrocephala – Acantholyda erythrocephala
- Tenthredo abietis – Cephalcia abietis
- Tenthredo sylvatica – Pamphilus sylvaticus
- Tenthredo nemoralis – Neurotoma nemoralis
- Tenthredo cynosbati – Janus cynosbati
- Tenthredo reticulata – Caenolyda reticulata
- Tenthredo betulae – Pamphilus betulae
- Tenthredo saltuum – Neurotoma saltuum
- Tenthredo intercus – ?
- Tenthredo rumicis – Polynematus annulatus
- Tenthredo ulmi – Cladius ulmi
- Tenthredo alni – Craesus septentrionalis
- Tenthredo pruni – Pareophora pruni
- Tenthredo lonicerae – Abia lonicerae
- Tenthredo capreae – Nematus salicis

== Ichneumon (ichneumon wasps) ==
- Ichneumon gigas - Urocerus gigas
- Ichneumon spectrum – Xeris spectrum
- Ichneumon juvencus – Sirex juvencus
- Ichneumon camelus - Xiphydria camelus
- Ichneumon ugillatorius
- Ichneumon raptorius – Diphyus raptorius
- Ichneumon sarcitorius – Ichneumon sarcitorius
- Ichneumon extensorius
- Ichneumon culpatorius – Probolus culpatorius
- Ichneumon constrictorius
- Ichneumon saturatorius – Vulgichneumon saturatorius
- Ichneumon crispatorius – Eutanyacra crispatorius
- Ichneumon pisorius
- Ichneumon luctatorius – Diphyus luctatorius
- Ichneumon volutatorius – Banchus volutatorius
- Ichneumon vaginatorius
- Ichneumon persuasorius – Rhyssa persuasoria
- Ichneumon designatorius - Melanichneumon designatorius
- Ichneumon edictorius – Ctenichneumon edictorius
- Ichneumon deliratorius – Coelichneumon deliratorius
- Ichneumon fossorius - Diphyus fossorius
- Ichneumon ariolator - Lymeon ariolator
- Ichneumon comitator – Coelichneumon comitator
- Ichneumon peregrinator – Barichneumon peregrinator
- Ichneumon incubitor – Gambrus incubitor
- Ichneumon reluctator – Echthrus reluctator
- Ichneumon denigrator - Atanycolus denigrator
- Ichneumon desertor - Cremnops desertor
- Ichneumon coruscator – Cratichneumon coruscator
- Ichneumon manifestator – Ephialtes manifestator
- Ichneumon compunctor – Apechthis compunctor
- Ichneumon delusor – Syntactus delusor
- Ichneumon venator – Banchus volutatorius
- Ichneumon extensor
- Ichneumon exarator
- Ichneumon turionellae – Pimpla turionellae
- Ichneumon strobilellae
- Ichneumon moderator
- Ichneumon resinellae - Macrocentrus resinellae
- Ichneumon praerogator - Tranosemella praerogator
- Ichneumon mandator – Agrothereutes mandator
- Ichneumon titillator – Meringopus titillator
- Ichneumon enervator
- Ichneumon gravidator - Proctotrupes gravidator
- Ichneumon inculcator – Cryptus inculcator
- Ichneumon pugillator – Dusona pugillator
- Ichneumon ruspator
- Ichneumon jaculator - Gasteruption jaculator
- Ichneumon assectator - Gasteruption assectator
- Ichneumon appendigaster
- Ichneumon luteus – Ophion luteus
- Ichneumon ramidulus – Enicospilus ramidulus
- Ichneumon glaucopterus – Opheltes glaucopterus
- Ichneumon circumflexus – Therion circumfiexum
- Ichneumon cinctus – Gelis cinctus
- Ichneumon muscarum - Pachyneuron muscarum
- Ichneumon bedeguaris - Torymus bedeguaris
- Ichneumon juniperi - Torymus juniperi
- Ichneumon puparum - Pteromalus puparum
- Ichneumon larvarum - Eulophus larvarum
- Ichneumon cyniphidis - Pteromalus cyniphidis
- Ichneumon coccorum
- Ichneumon secalis
- Ichneumon subcutaneus
- Ichneumon aphidum
- Ichneumon ovulorum - Polynema ovulorum
- Ichneumon globatus - Microgaster globata
- Ichneumon glomeratus - Cotesia glomerata
- Ichneumon pectinicornis

== Sphex (digger wasps) ==
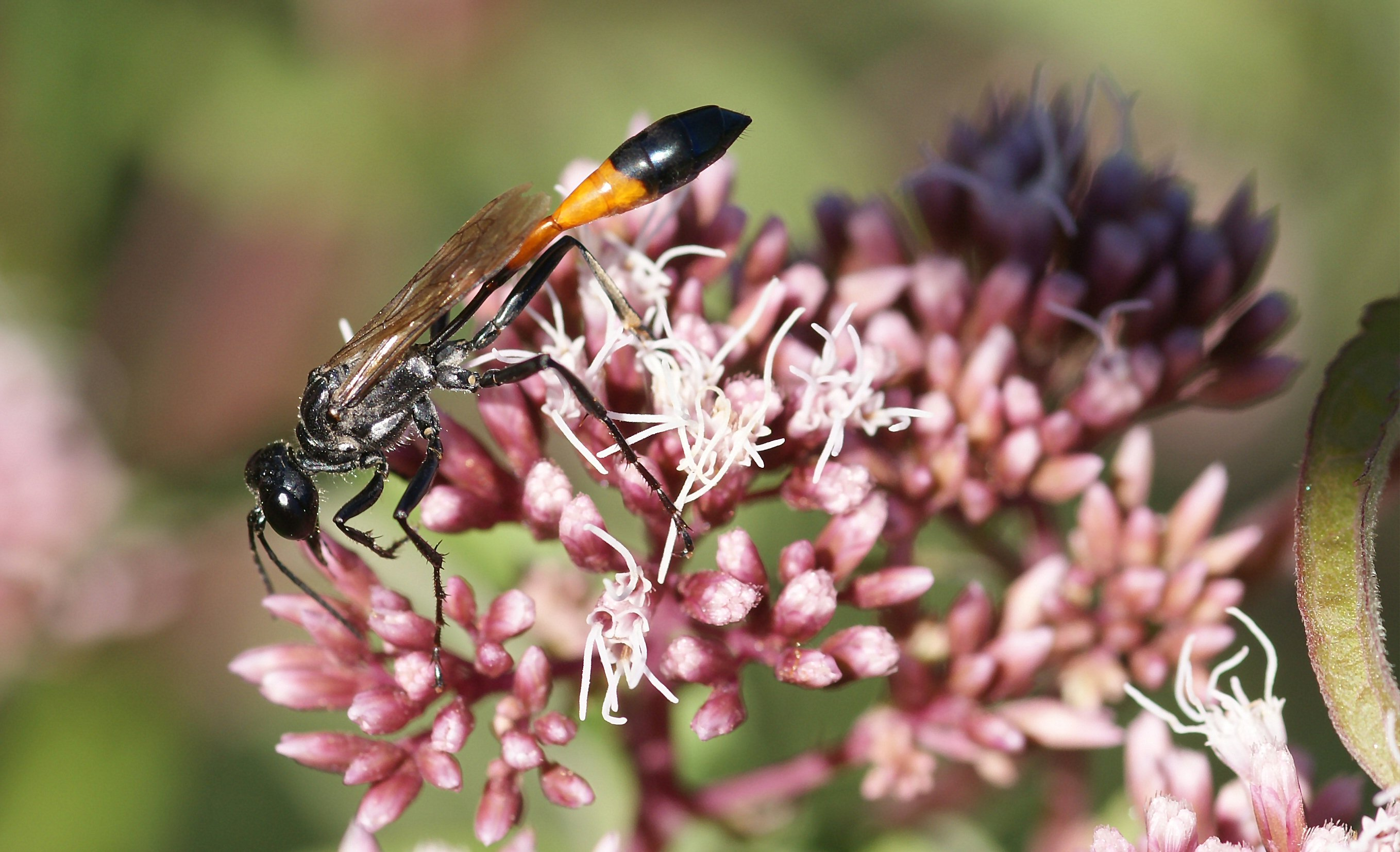
Ammophila sabulosa was named Sphex sabulosa in 1758.

- Sphex argillacea – Zeta argillaceum
- Sphex sabulosa – Ammophila sabulosa
- Sphex asiatica – Sceliphron asiaticum
- Sphex fervens – Prionyx fervens
- Sphex inda
- Sphex clavipes
- Sphex spirifex & Sphex aegyptia – Sceliphron spirifex
- Sphex figulus – Trypoxylon figulus
- Sphex viatica - Anoplius viaticus
- Sphex pectinipes
- Sphex variegata
- Sphex indica
- Sphex tropica - Vespa tropica
- Sphex colon
- Sphex gibba
- Sphex rufipes
- Sphex arenaria
- Sphex fossoria - Ectemnius fossorius
- Sphex leucostoma - Crossocerus leucostoma
- Sphex vaga
- Sphex caerulea
- Sphex ignita - Chrysis ignita
- Sphex aurata
- Sphex cyanea

== Vespa (hornets & wasps) ==
- Vespa crabro – European hornet
- Vespa vulgaris – Vespula vulgaris, common wasp
- Vespa rufa – Vespula rufa
- Vespa parietum - Ancistrocerus parietum
- Vespa muraria - Symmorphus murarius
- Vespa cribraria - Crabro cribrarius
- Vespa spinipes - Odynerus spinipes
- Vespa rupestris
- Vespa coarctata - Eumenes coarctatus
- Vespa arvensis - Mellinus arvensis
- Vespa biglumis - Polistes biglumis
- Vespa uniglumis - Oxybelus uniglumis
- Vespa cornuta
- Vespa signata - Stictia signata
- Vespa canadensis
- Vespa emarginata
- Vespa calida - Synagris calida

== Apis (bees) ==
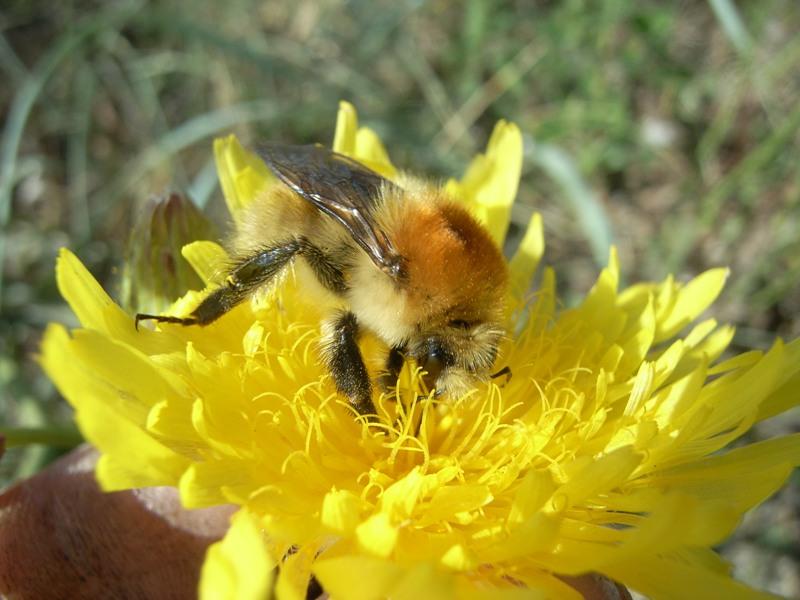
Bombus muscorum, originally named Apis muscorum in 1758

- Apis longicornis - Eucera longicornis
- Apis tumulorum - Halictus tumulorum
- Apis clavicornis
- Apis centuncularis
- Apis cineraria
- Apis surinamensis – Eufriesea surinamensis
- Apis retusa
- Apis rufa - Osmia bicornis
- Apis bicornis - Osmia bicornis
- Apis truncorum
- Apis dentata – Exaerete dentata
- Apis cordata – Euglossa cordata
- Apis helvola - Andrena helvola
- Apis succincta - Colletes succinctus
- Apis zonata - Amegilla zonata
- Apis caerulescens - Osmia caerulescens
- Apis mellifera – Western honey bee
- Apis subterranea
- Apis variegata - Epeolus variegatus
- Apis rostrata - Bembix rostrata
- Apis manicata
- Apis quadridentata - Coelioxys conicus
- Apis florisomnis - Chelostoma florisomne
- Apis conica - Coelioxys conicus
- Apis annulata - Hylaeus annulatus
- Apis ruficornis - Nomada ruficornis
- Apis ichneumonea – Sphex ichneumoneus
- Apis cariosa
- Apis violacea – Xylocopa violacea, violet carpenter bee
- Apis terrestris – Bombus terrestris, buff-tailed bumblebee
- Apis lapidaria – Bombus lapidarius, red-tailed bumblebee
- Apis muscorum – Bombus muscorum, moss carder bee
- Apis hypnorum – Bombus hypnorum, new garden bumblebee
- Apis acervorum - Bombus subterraneus
- Apis subterranea – Bombus subterraneus, short-haired bumblebee
- Apis surinamensis - Eufriesea surinamensis
- Apis aestuans - Xylocopa aestuans
- Apis tropica - Eufriesea surinamensis
- Apis alpina – Bombus alpinus

== Formica (ants) ==
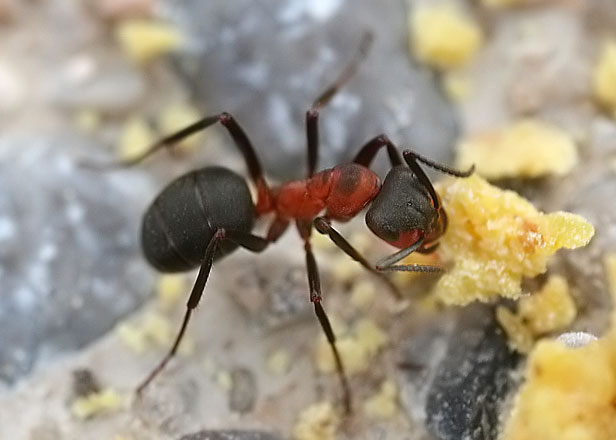
Formica rufa was named by Linnaeus in 1758.

- Formica herculeana – Camponotus herculeana
- Formica rufa
- Formica fusca
- Formica nigra – Black garden ant
- Formica obsoleta
- Formica rubra – Myrmica rubra
- Formica pharaonis – Monomorium pharaonis
- Formica salomonis – Monomorium salomonis
- Formica saccharivora
- Formica caespitum – Tetramorium caespitum
- Formica omnivora
- Formica bidens – Dolichoderus bidens
- Formica sexdens – Atta sexdens
- Formica cephalotes – Atta cephalotes
- Formica atrata – Cephalotes atratus
- Formica haematoda – Odontomachus haematodus
- Formica foetida – Pachycondyla foetida

== Mutilla (velvet ants) ==
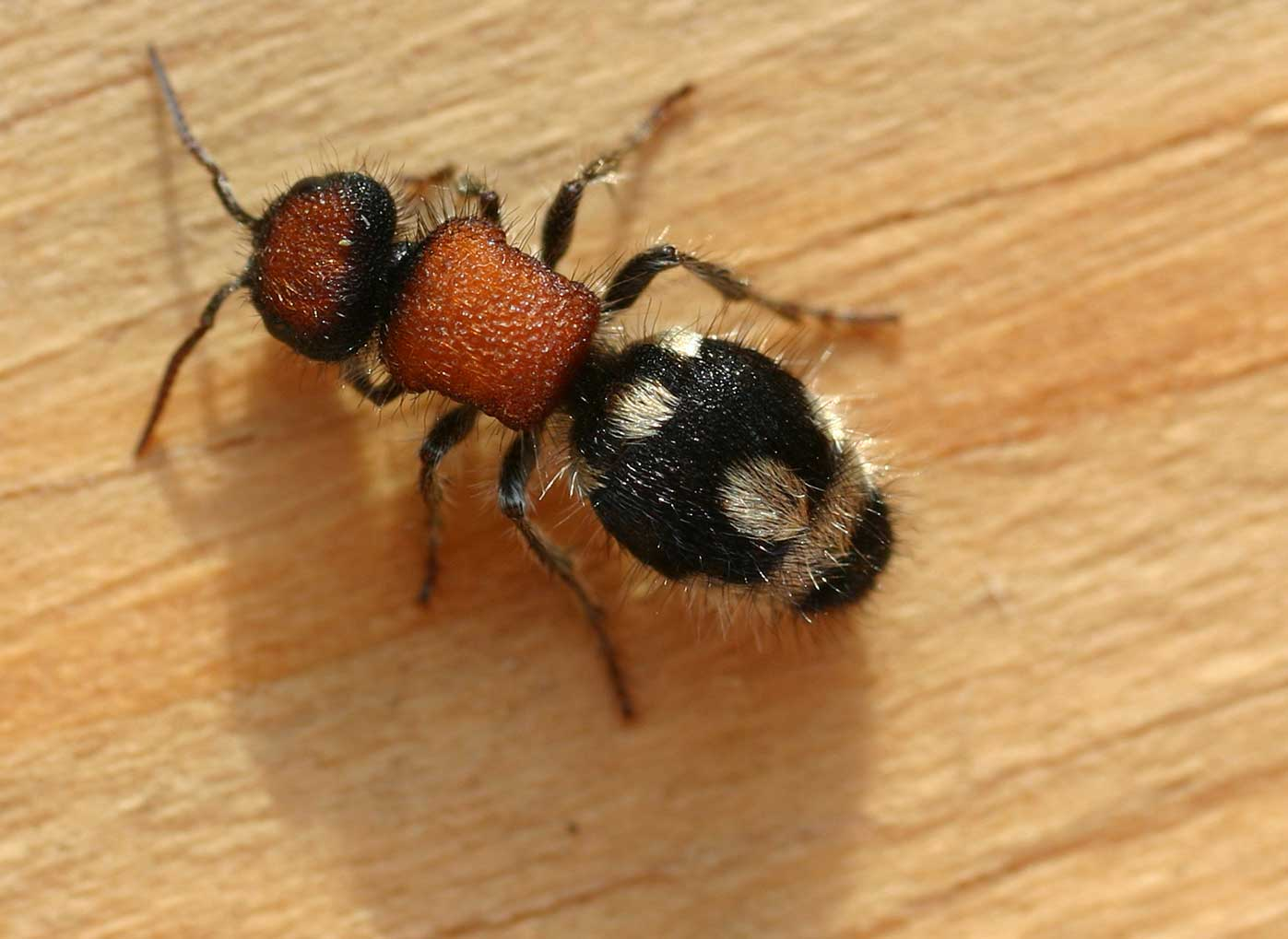
The velvet ant Ronisia barbara was named Mutilla barbara in 1758.

- Mutilla occidentalis – Dasymutilla occidentalis
- Mutilla americana – Traumatomutilla americana
- Mutilla indica
- Mutilla europaea
- Mutilla barbara – Ronisia barbara
- Mutilla maura – Dasylabris maura
- Mutilla acarorum – Gelis acarorum
- Mutilla formicaria – Gelis formicarius
