= Water figwort =

Water figwort is a common name for several plants and may refer to:

- Scrophularia auriculata, found in western Europe and north Africa
- Scrophularia umbrosa, found in Europe and Asia
