= Water betony =

Water betony may refer to:

- Scrophularia umbrosa, a species of plant
- Shargacucullia scrophulariae, a species of moth
