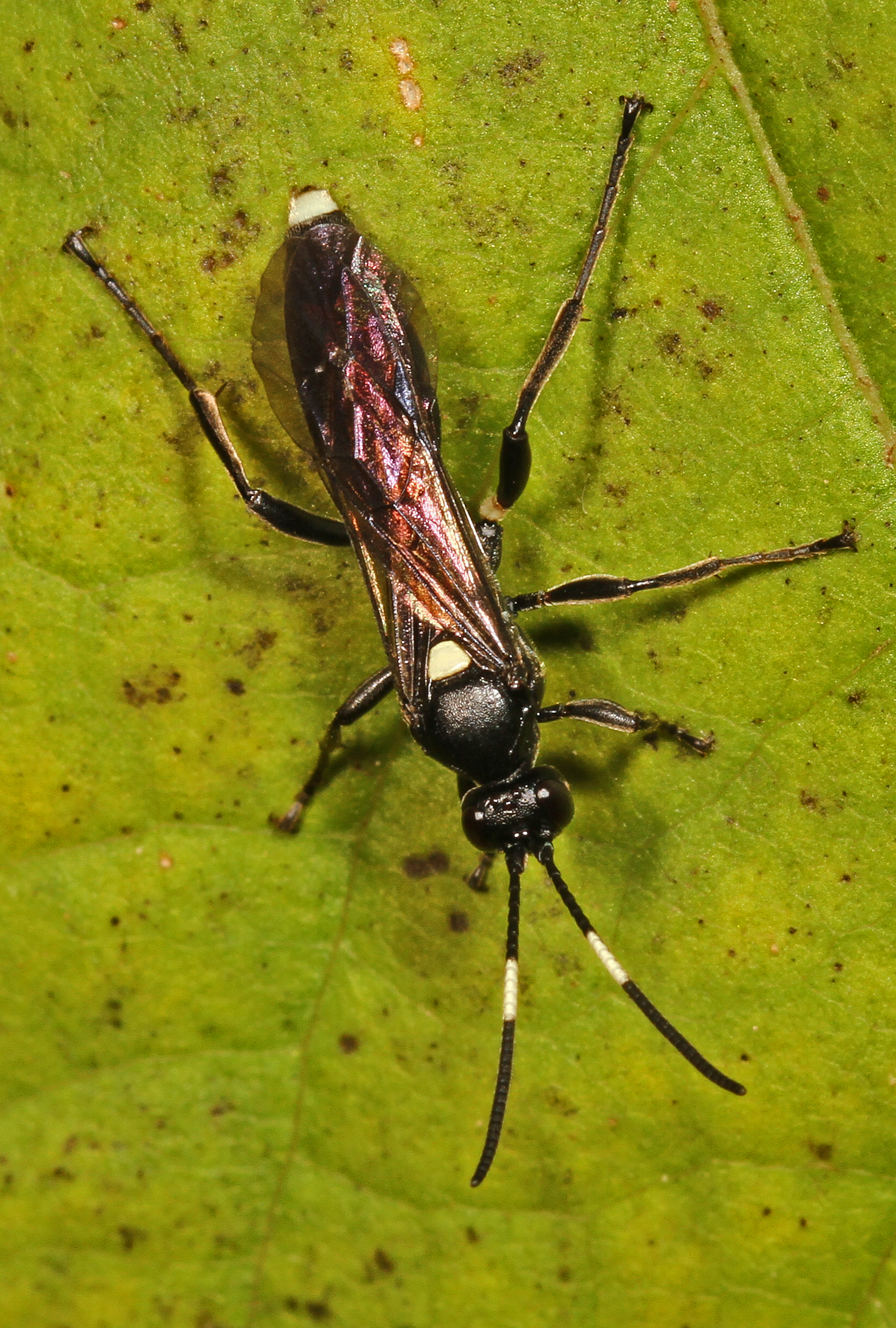

Scientific classification
- Domain: Eukaryota
- Kingdom: Animalia
- Phylum: Arthropoda
- Class: Insecta
- Order: Hymenoptera
- Family: Ichneumonidae
- Genus: Vulgichneumon
- Species: V. brevicinctor

Binomial name
- Vulgichneumon brevicinctor (Say, 1825)

= Vulgichneumon brevicinctor =

Species of wasp

Vulgichneumon brevicinctor is a species of ichneumon wasp in the family Ichneumonidae. One of the most common species of the subfamily Ichneumoninae in North America, the wasp is found in most of the US and Canada. It is a parasitoid of moths such as the European corn borer and Cisseps fulvicollis.

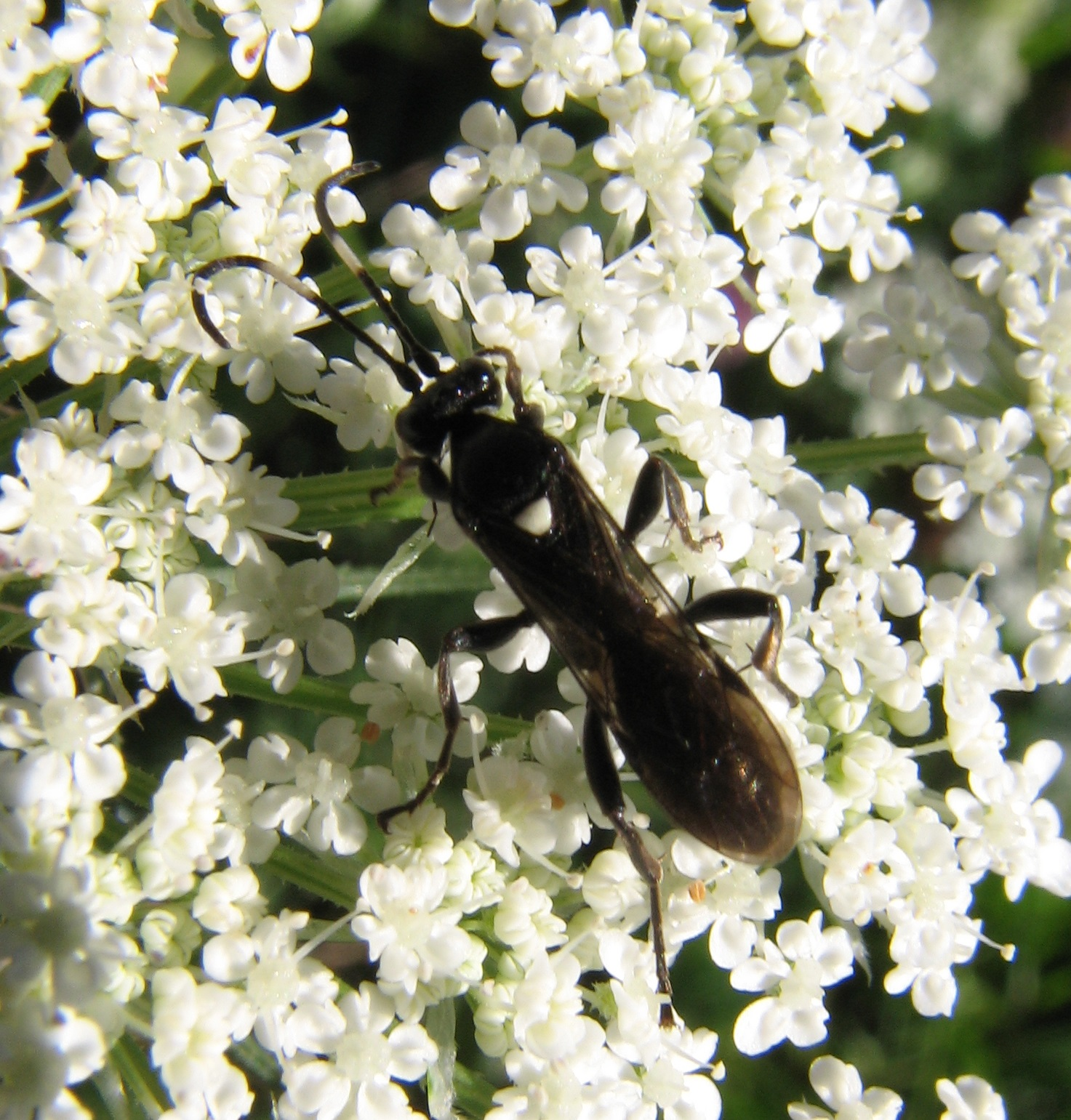
Female
