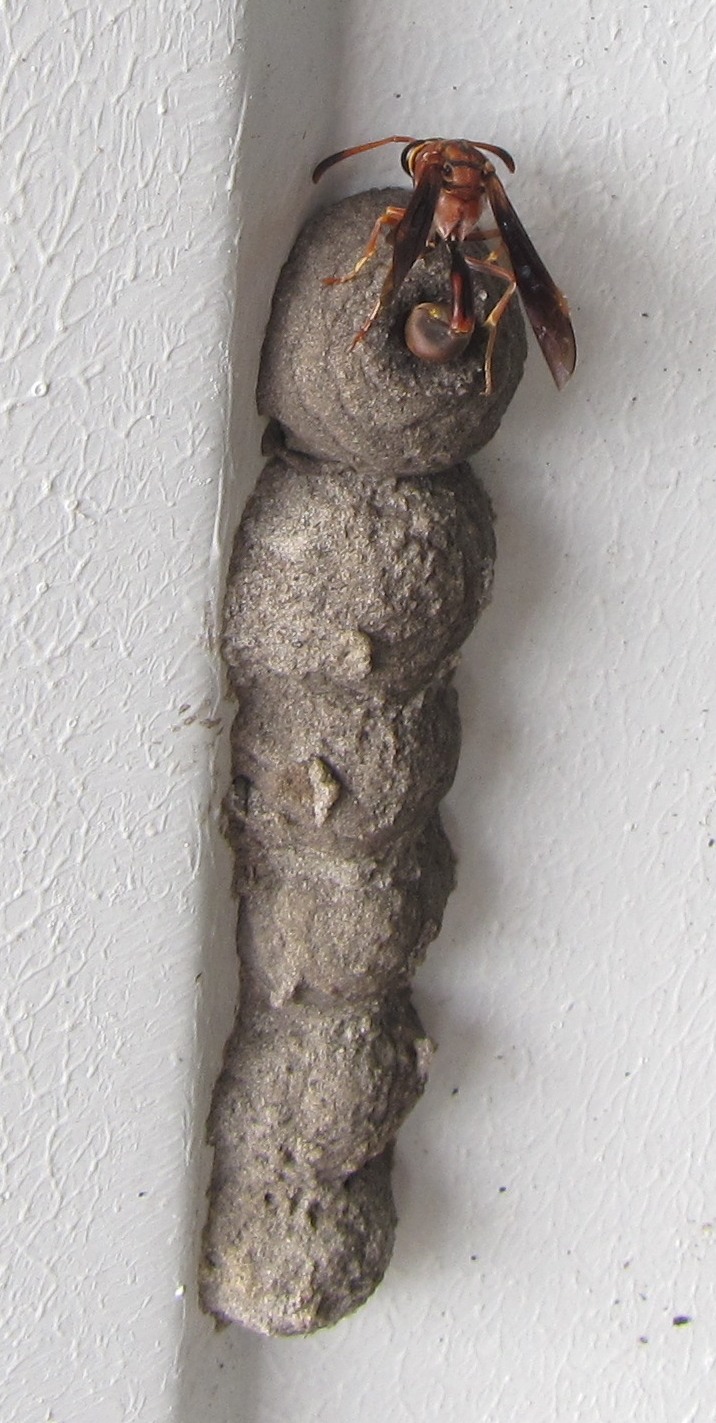
- Zeta argillaceum

Scientific classification
- Domain: Eukaryota
- Kingdom: Animalia
- Phylum: Arthropoda
- Class: Insecta
- Order: Hymenoptera
- Family: Vespidae
- Subfamily: Eumeninae
- Genus: Zeta; Saussure, 1855

Type species
- Zeta abdominale (Drury, 1770)

Species
- Zeta abdominale (Drury, 1770); Zeta argillaceum (Linnaeus, 1758); Zeta confusum (Bequaert & Salt, 1931); Zeta mendozanum (Schrottky, 1909)

= Zeta (wasp) =

Genus of wasps

Zeta is a small neotropical genus of potter wasps currently containing 4 species. Three of them have restricted distributions: Zeta confusum is found only in Cuba; Zeta abdominale is spread through several Caribbean Islands (Jamaica, Hispaniola, Puerto Rico, Virgin Islands and Antigua, with three presently recognized subspecies) and Zeta mendozanum is restricted to the Monte and Patagonia regions of Argentina. Zeta argillaceum, on the other hand, is a very common, widespread and variable species found in the continental Americas from the southern United States (where it was probably introduced) to central Argentina. The wide range of color variation of this species has led to the recognition of a number of subspecies and varieties currently treated as simple synonyms.

== Gallery ==
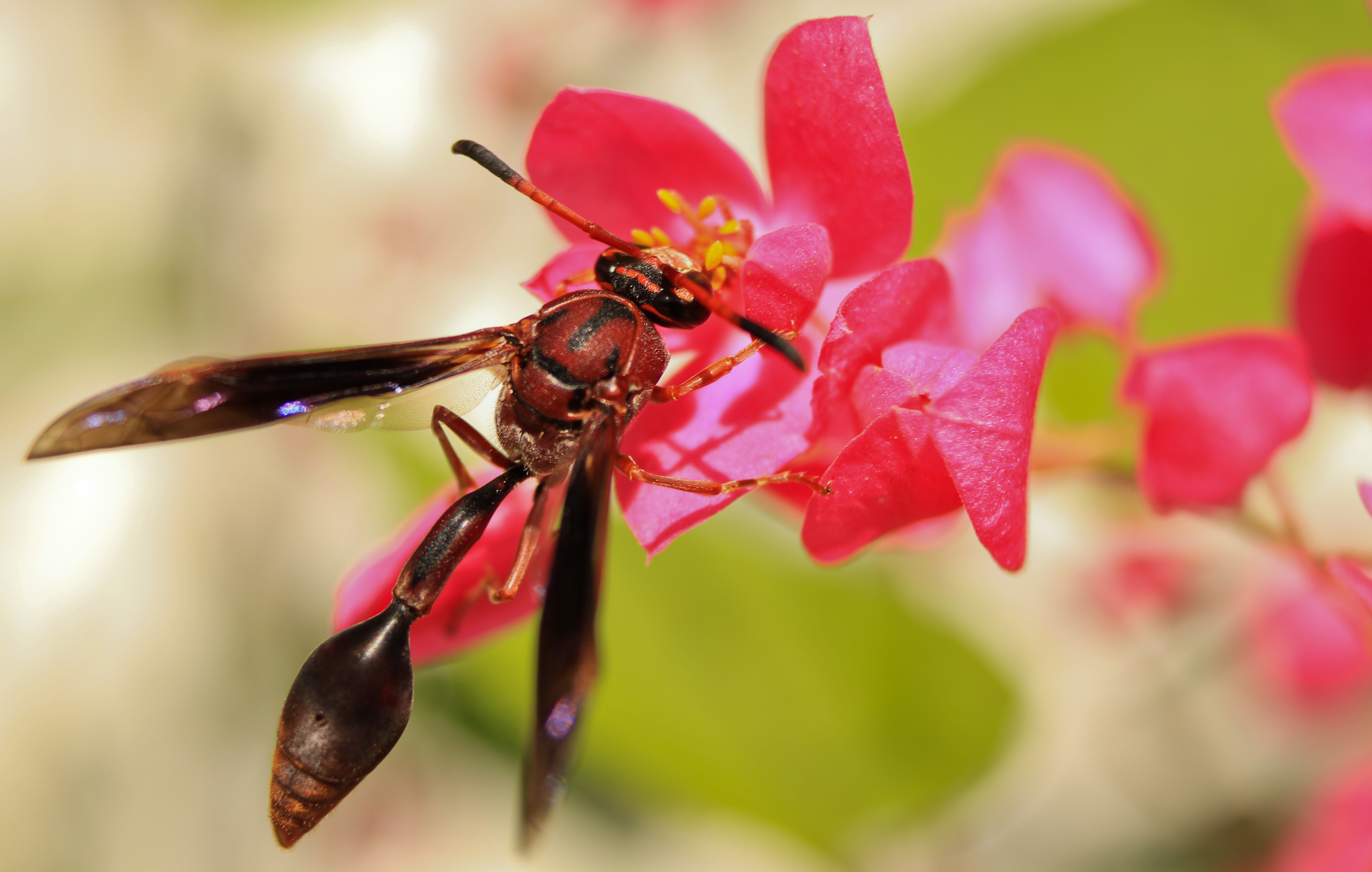
Zeta argillaceum
