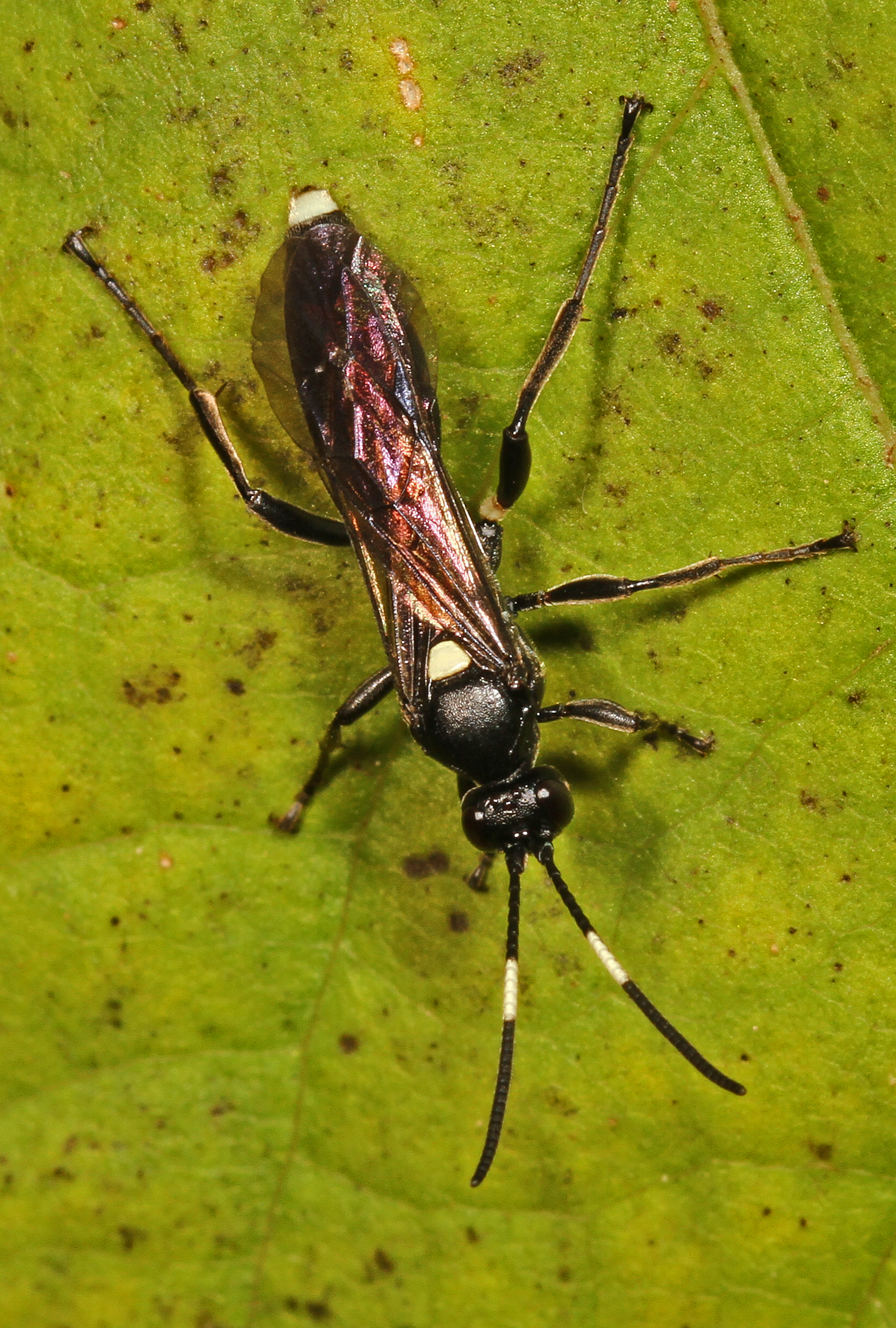
- Vulgichneumon brevicinctor

Scientific classification
- Kingdom: Animalia
- Phylum: Arthropoda
- Class: Insecta
- Order: Hymenoptera
- Family: Ichneumonidae
- Tribe: Ichneumonini
- Genus: Vulgichneumon; Heinrich, 1961

= Vulgichneumon =

Genus of wasps

Vulgichneumon is a genus of ichneumon wasps in the family Ichneumonidae. There are at least 30 described species in Vulgichneumon.

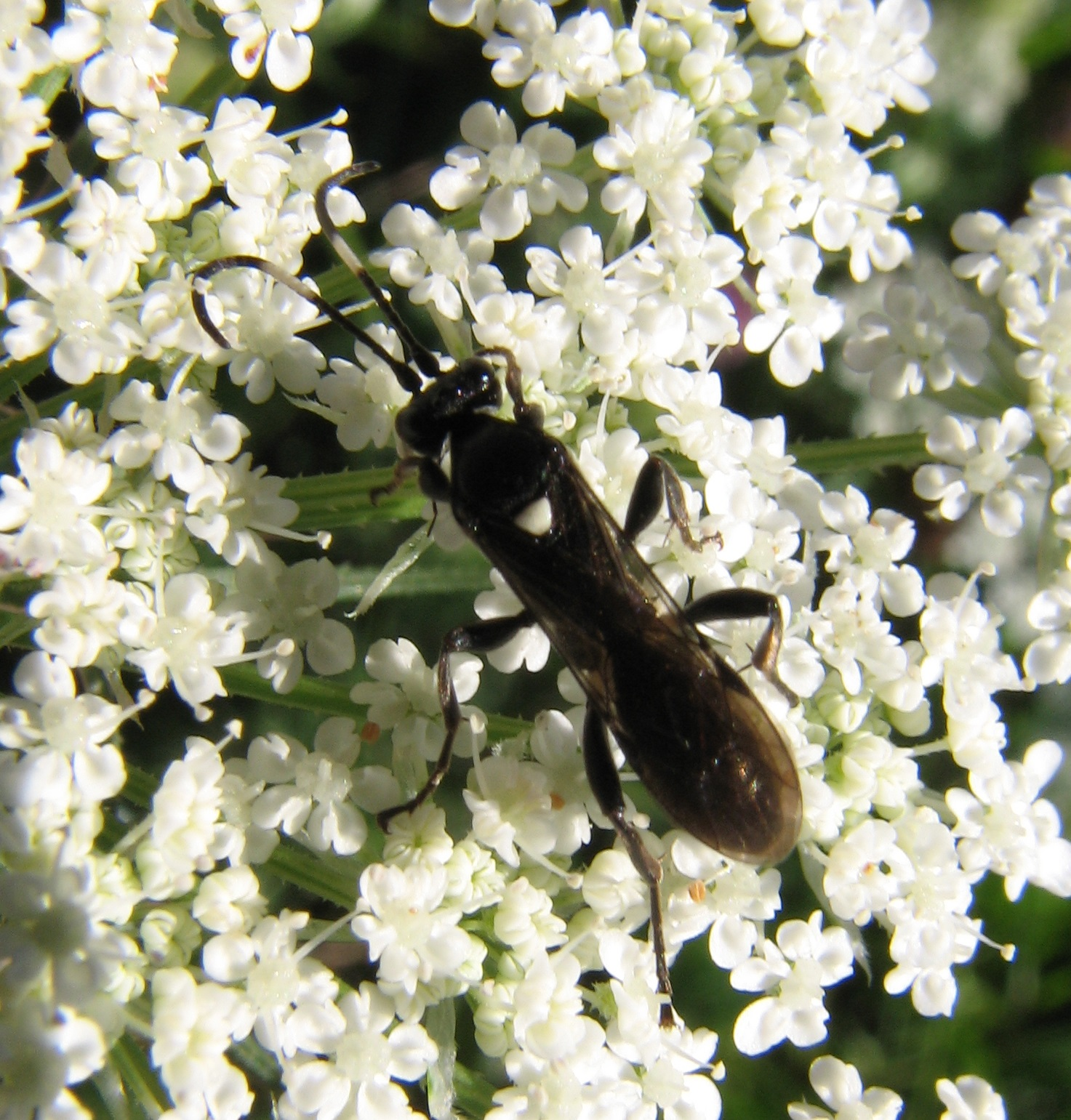
Vulgichneumon brevicinctor female

== Species ==
These 30 species belong to the genus Vulgichneumon:

- Vulgichneumon bimaculatus (Schrank, 1776)^{c g}
- Vulgichneumon brevicinctor (Say, 1825)^{c g b}
- Vulgichneumon cagnatus (Fonscolombe, 1847)^{c g}
- Vulgichneumon clypeatus (Berthoumieu, 1896)^{c g}
- Vulgichneumon cordiger (Kriechbaumer, 1882)^{c g}
- Vulgichneumon deceptor (Scopoli, 1763)^{c g}
- Vulgichneumon diminutus (Matsumura, 1912)^{c g}
- Vulgichneumon drydeni Heinrich, 1978^{c g}
- Vulgichneumon faunus (Gravenhorst, 1829)^{g}
- Vulgichneumon heleiobatos (Porter, 1964)^{c g}
- Vulgichneumon hirookaensis (Uchida, 1935)^{c g}
- Vulgichneumon horstmanni Selfa & Anento, 1996^{c g}
- Vulgichneumon inconspicuus (Heinrich, 1938)^{c g}
- Vulgichneumon leucaniae (Uchida, 1924)^{c g}
- Vulgichneumon leucanioides (Iwata, 1958)^{c g}
- Vulgichneumon lissolaba Townes, Momoi & Townes, 1965^{c g}
- Vulgichneumon mimicus (Cresson, 1867)^{c g}
- Vulgichneumon normops Heinrich, 1967^{c g}
- Vulgichneumon phaeogenops Heinrich, 1972^{c g}
- Vulgichneumon saevus (Cresson, 1867)^{c g}
- Vulgichneumon saturatorius (Linnaeus, 1758)^{c g}
- Vulgichneumon siremps (Kokujev, 1909)^{c g}
- Vulgichneumon stegemanni (Heinrich, 1934)^{c g}
- Vulgichneumon suavis (Gravenhorst, 1820)^{c g}
- Vulgichneumon suigensis (Uchida, 1927)^{c g}
- Vulgichneumon taiwanensis (Uchida, 1927)^{c g}
- Vulgichneumon takagii (Uchida, 1956)^{c g}
- Vulgichneumon terminalis (Cresson, 1864)^{c}
- Vulgichneumon trifarius (Berthoumieu, 1892)^{c g}
- Vulgichneumon uchidai Momoi, 1970^{c g}

Data sources: i = ITIS, c = Catalogue of Life, g = GBIF, b = Bugguide.net
