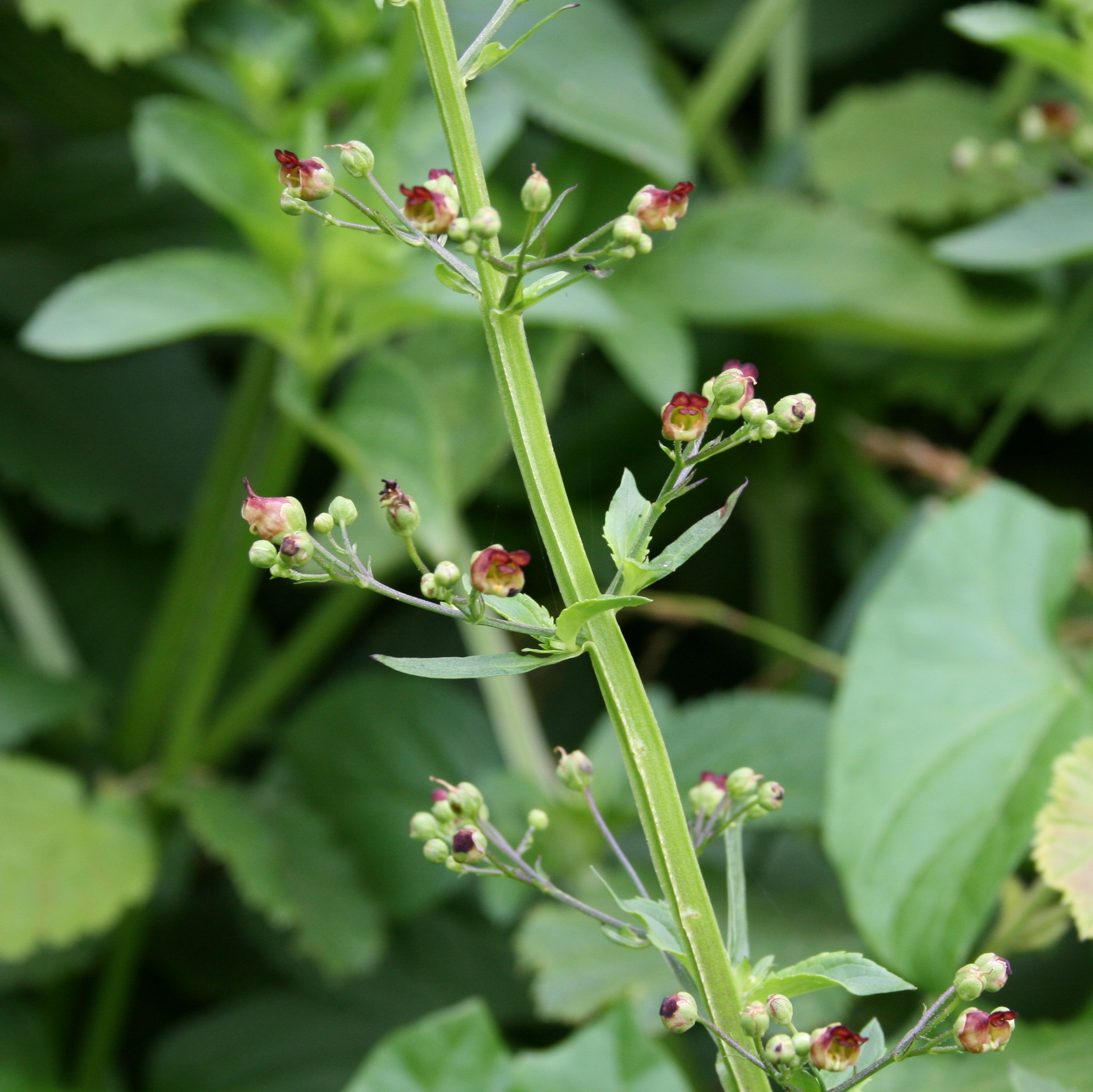

Conservation status
- Least Concern (IUCN 3.1)

Scientific classification
- Kingdom: Plantae
- Clade: Tracheophytes
- Clade: Angiosperms
- Clade: Eudicots
- Clade: Asterids
- Order: Lamiales
- Family: Scrophulariaceae
- Genus: Scrophularia
- Species: S. oblongifolia

Binomial name
- Scrophularia oblongifolia Loisel. (1827)

Synonyms
- List: Scrophularia alata Gilib.; Scrophularia ehrharti Stevens; Scrophularia hurstii Druce; Scrophularia samaritanii (Boiss. & Heldr.) Halács; Scrophularia umbrosa Dumort.

= Scrophularia oblongifolia =

Species of flowering plant

Scrophularia oblongifolia (syn. S. umbrosa), green figwort, is a perennial herbaceous plant found in Europe and Asia. It grows in damp, shady places such as wet woodland and farmland ditches. It is very similar to the closely related Scrophularia auriculata (water figwort), from which it is best separated by the shape of the staminode.

== Description ==
Green figwort is a hemicryptophyte perennial monoecious herb with no basal rosette and a short rhizome, which grows to about 100 cm tall. The whole plant is a rather pale green colour, sometimes with a hint of brown or purple, and completely glabrous (hairless). The stem is square in section, with broad wings at the angles, and generally rather weak, causing the plant to sprawl over vegetation rather than growing upright on its own.

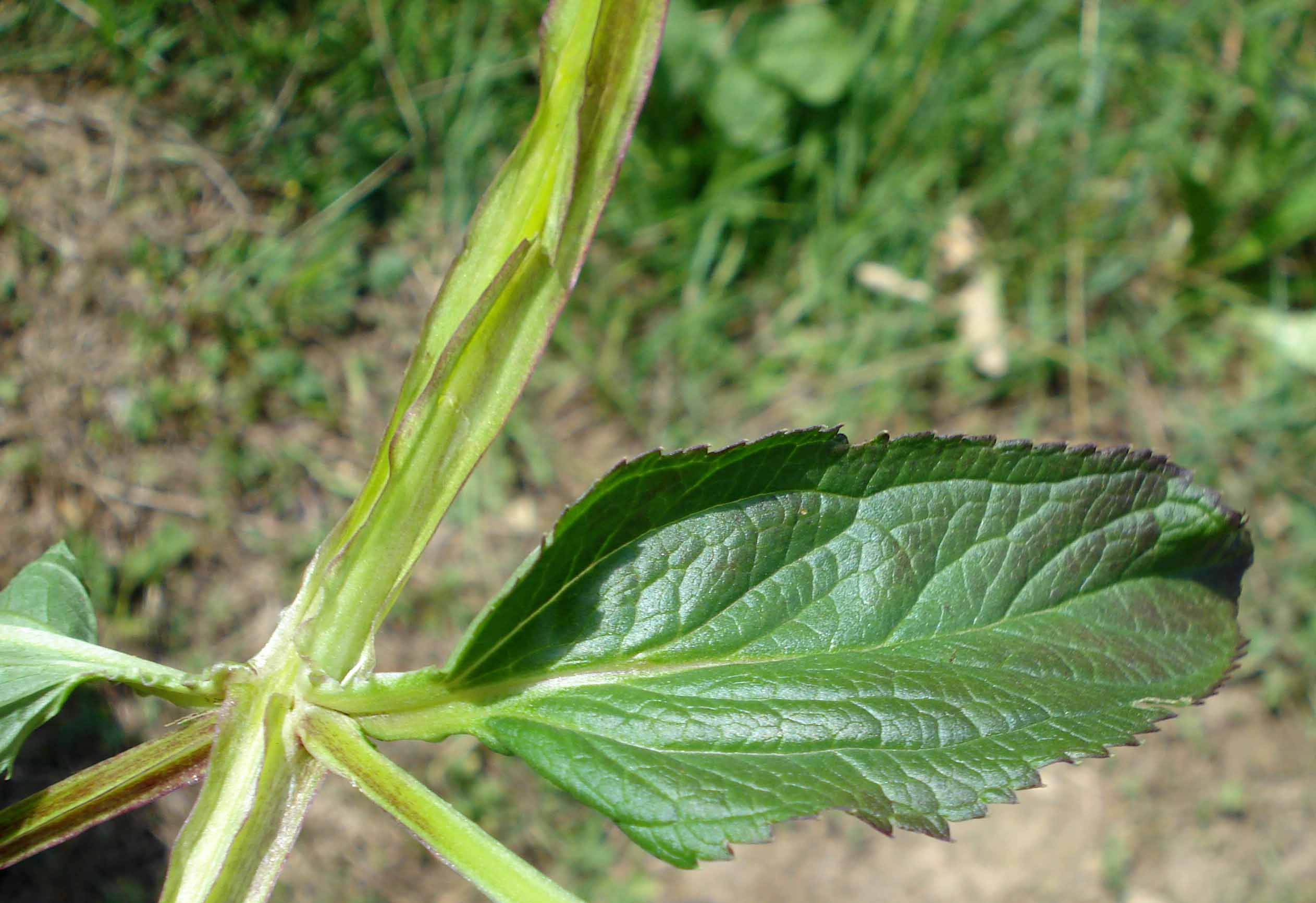
The stems are square and broadly winged.

The leaves are arranged in opposite pairs on petioles up to 15 mm long, with an ovate to oblong blade of about 12 × 4 cm and a fairly pointed tip, with a rounded (but not cordate) base. The margins are more sharply serrated than in water figwort.

Flowering occurs around July in northern Europe. The inflorescence is a panicle, essentially an extension of the main stem, that consists of opposite pairs of rather lax cymes which arise from the axils of the bracts (upper leaves). Each flower has a pedicel about 5 mm long, the same length as the flower. The calyx and corolla are 5-lobed, but the lobes of the corolla are grouped into two "lips" - the upper one made of two of the lobes and the lower one of the other three, which are almost fused. The flowers are bisexual with 4 fertile stamens and 1 sterile staminode, which is distinctively 2-lobed. There is one style with a capitate (blob-shaped) stigma.

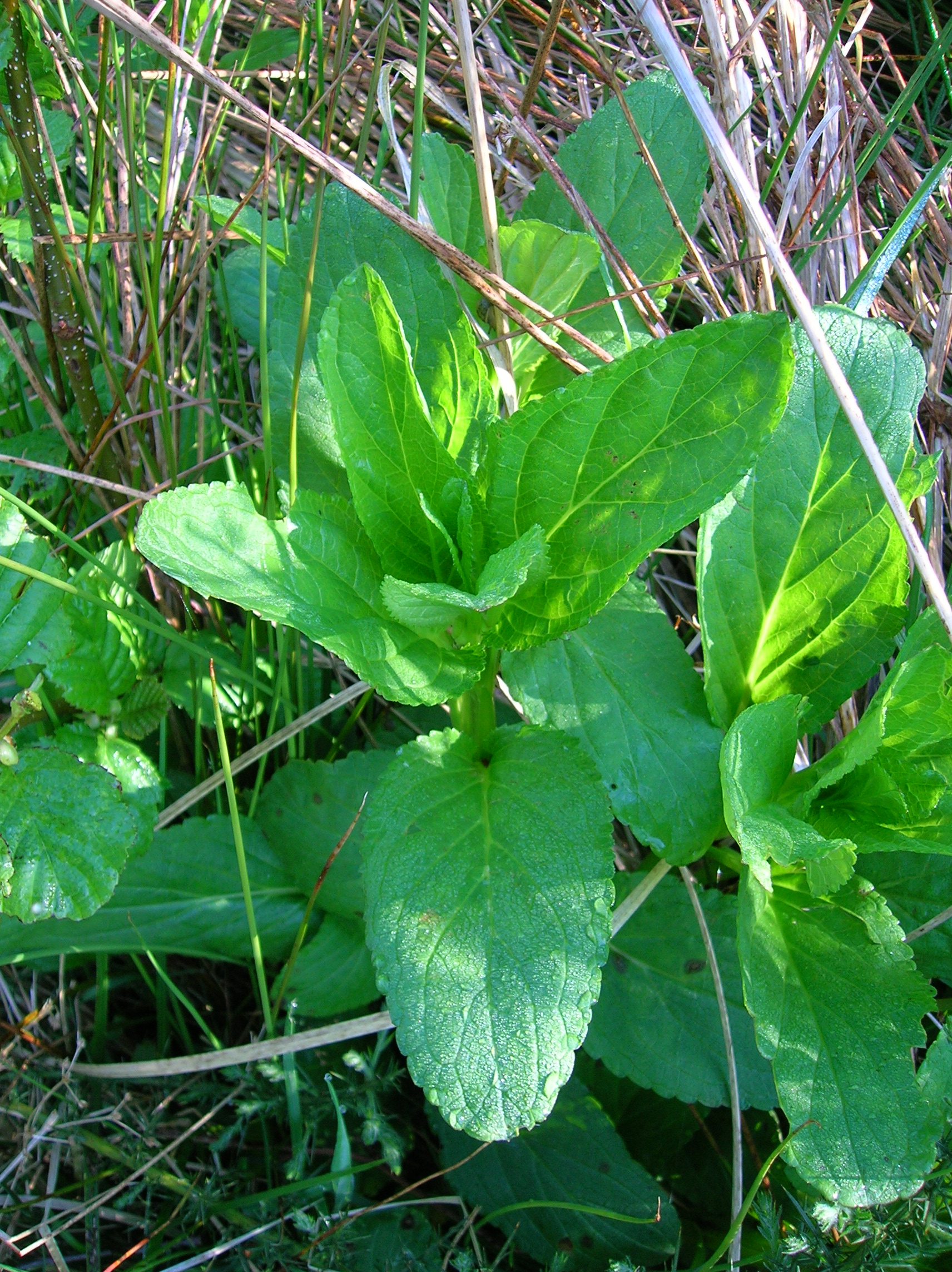
Basal leaves

At maturity, the fruit is a round capsule some 4–6 mm long, containing many tiny, brown wrinkled seeds about 0.5 mm in diameter.

== Taxonomy ==
The name Scrophularia oblongifolia was coined by the French botanist Jean-Louis-Auguste Loiseleur-Deslongchamps in Mémoires de la Société linnéenne de Paris vol. 6, p. 418 (1827). The same year, the Belgian botanist Barthélemy Charles Joseph Dumortier named a rather similar plant Scrophularia umbrosa in his Florula Belgica. The descriptions of both are rather scanty and there has long been speculation that they may be the same species. The current view is that they are, so the correct name should be S. oblongifolia, as that one was published first.

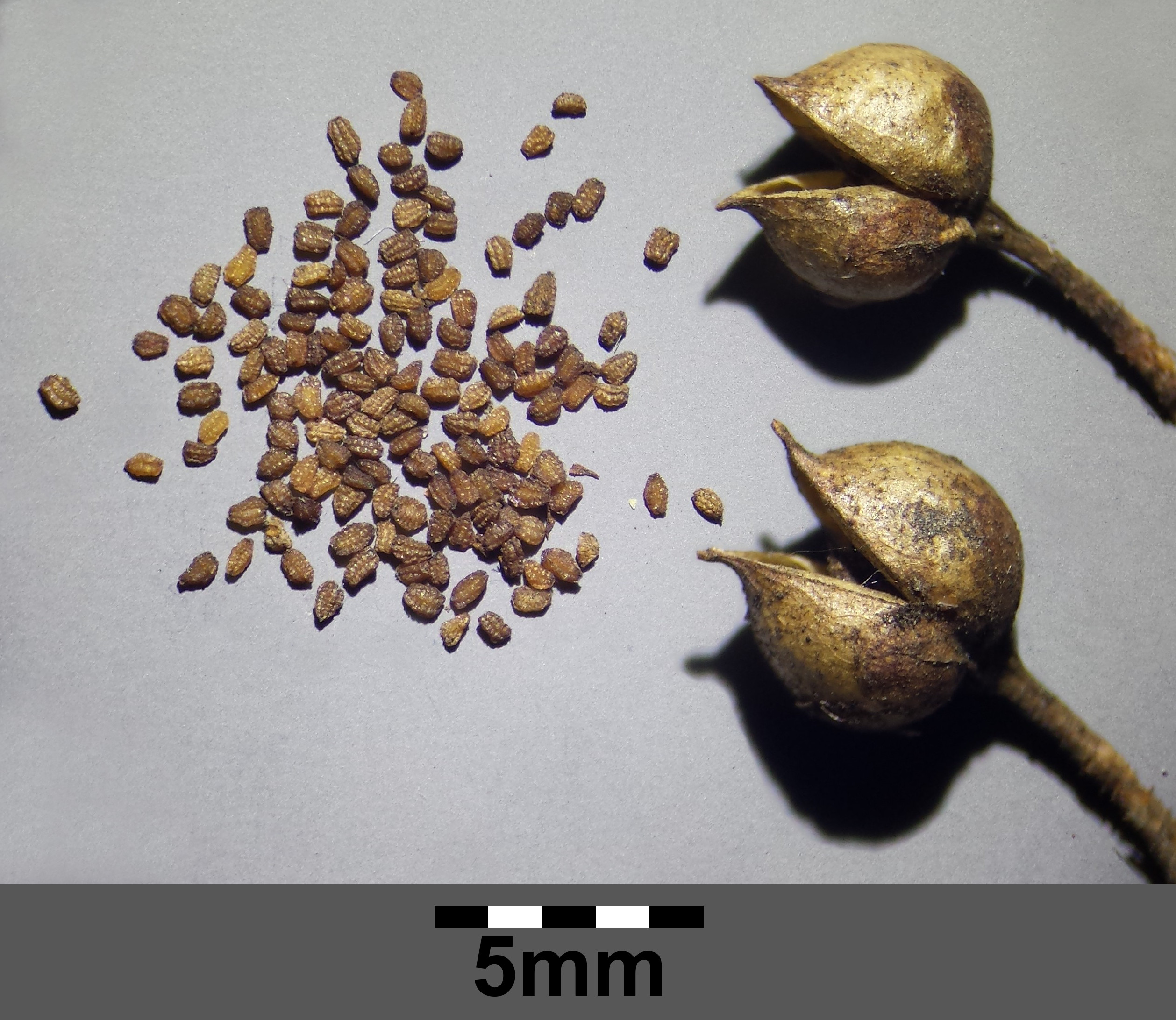
Fruit capsules and seeds

In Britain, this species was first described by C. A. Stevens and William Allport Leighton in 1840 from a specimen in the Linnaean Herbarium that had been collected by the German botanist Jakob Friedrich Ehrhart some 50 years earlier and mis-labelled S. aquatica (= S. auriculata). However, this was a continental specimen, not a British one, and so it does not count as the first British record, although various publications make that claim. Stevens named the apparently new species Scrophularia Ehrharti [sic], which makes that name a synonym of S. oblongifolia.

There have been various taxonomic treatments of the genus Scrophularia but at present there are no widely accepted subspecies of green figwort. Hybrids with water figwort have been produced in cultivation, but there are no known hybrids in the wild. Despite this, there is some evidence that S. auriculata (chromosome number 2n = 84) may itself have arisen by a hybridisation event between S. umbrosa (2n = 26) and S. lyrata or S. hispida (both 2n = 58).

The name "figwort" and the genus Scrophularia are derived from a different species, Scrophularia nodosa, which has tubers amongst its roots which somewhat resemble scrofulas and so were used as a treatment for this disease. The specific names "green figwort" and "oblongifolia" are self-evident, but the old name for this plant, S. umbrosa is more interesting, meaning "shady figwort".

== Identification ==
Green figwort is very similar to the much commoner water figwort, which is why it was overlooked by botanists for so long. Differences include the leaf shape (sometimes lobed in water figwort), the teeth on the leaf margin (blunter in water figwort), and the shape of the staminode, which is bilobed in green figwort vs. entire in water figwort.

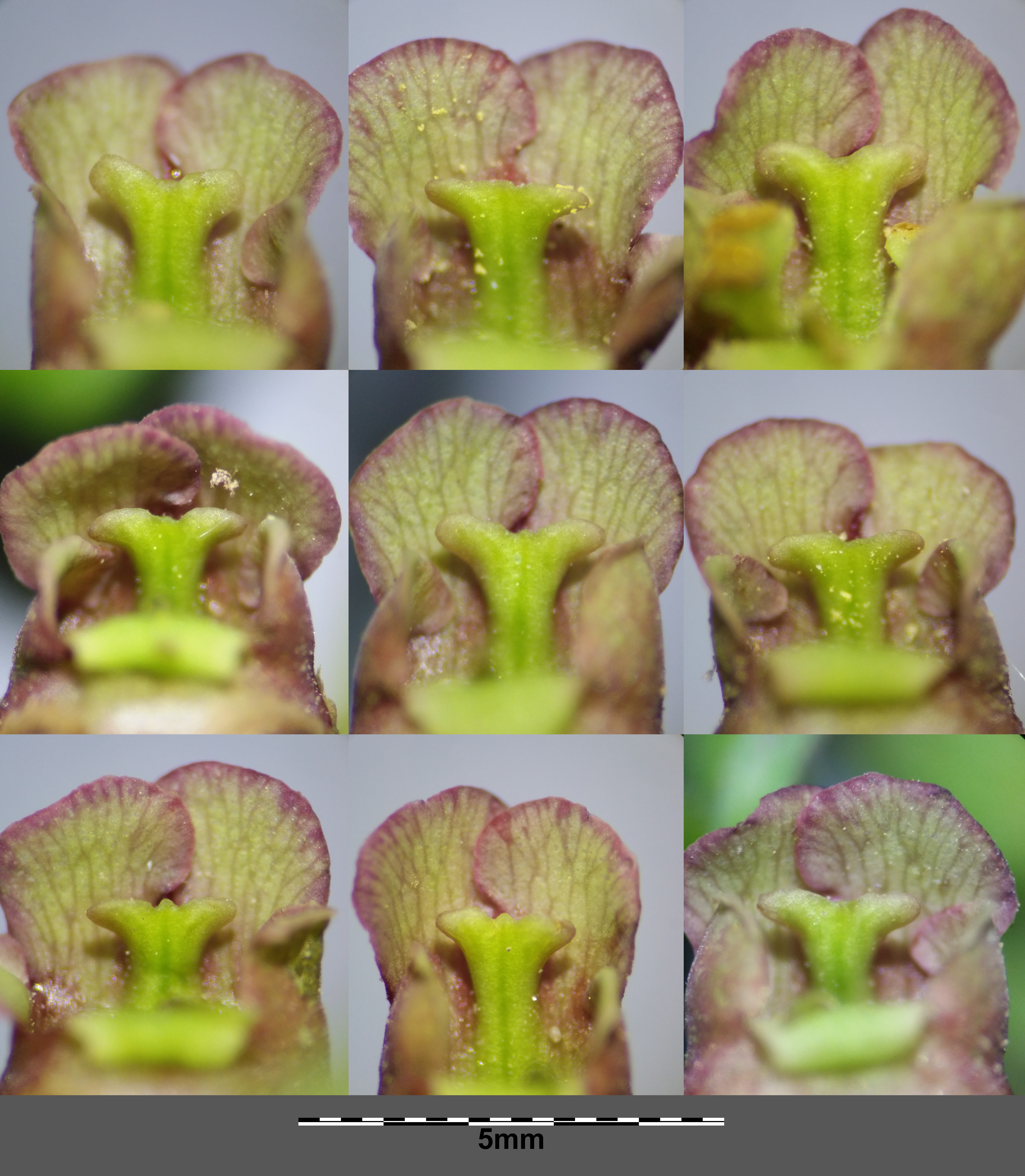
Close-ups of the staminode

== Distribution and status ==
Green figwort is native to Europe and western Asia, as far north as the Baltic states and eastward to Xinjiang. It does not occur in Africa and in Sweden it is considered to be a recent introduction. It is not otherwise recorded as an introduction outside its natural range. There are old records of a figwort, either green- or water-figwort (accounts differ), as a casual in harbours in New York and Pennsylvania in the 19th century, but it did not persist.

In Britain there are distinct several areas where green figwort is quite common. These are centred on several major river basins, such as the lower Severn in Worcestershire and neighbouring counties. Possibly the first British record is from this area, in 1848, when it was found by J.H. Thompson beside the Sapey Brook. Other centres of distribution include the valleys of the River Yare in Norfolk, the Ribble in Yorkshire, the Eden in Cumbria and the Tweed in Scotland.

The global conservation status of this species, as of 2013, is Least Concern, as it is in Britain and France. In Ireland, however, it is much rarer and considered to be Near Threatened in the Republic, and protected under Schedule 8 of the Wildlife (Northern Ireland) Order in the north. It is considered an axiophyte in any British county.

== Habitat and ecology ==
The habitat of green figwort is on the edge of ditches in farmland and small streams through woods, where it trails over other plants rather than growing erect. It is found in swamps of sedges such as false fox-sedge or in light woodland, typically slightly calcareous W8 ash woodland in Britain. Its Ellenberg values in Britain are L = 7, F = 9, R = 7, N = 7, and S = 0, which describe its habitat as semi-open, very wet, with a neutral pH and moderate fertility; but no salt. It is often found growing with water figwort, wood clubrush, yellow loosestrife and hemlock water-dropwort.

Plants are often infected with the rust Uromyces scrophulariae (DC.) Fuckel (1870), which produces marks and distortions at the base of the stem.

In Britain, the beetles Longitarsus agilis and L. nigrofasciatus, and the sawfly Tenthredo scrophulariae are phytophagous on the leaves, whereas Cionus hortulanus eats the fruits and flowers as well. There is also a small fly called Contarinia scrophulariae which creates galls in the flower buds. In Europe, there are many more pests recorded on this species.

There is no information on the toxicity of green figwort specifically, but the closely related water figwort has been reported to cause sickness in young cattle that ate it, and the same might well be true of green figwort.

It is pollinated by bees and wasps.
