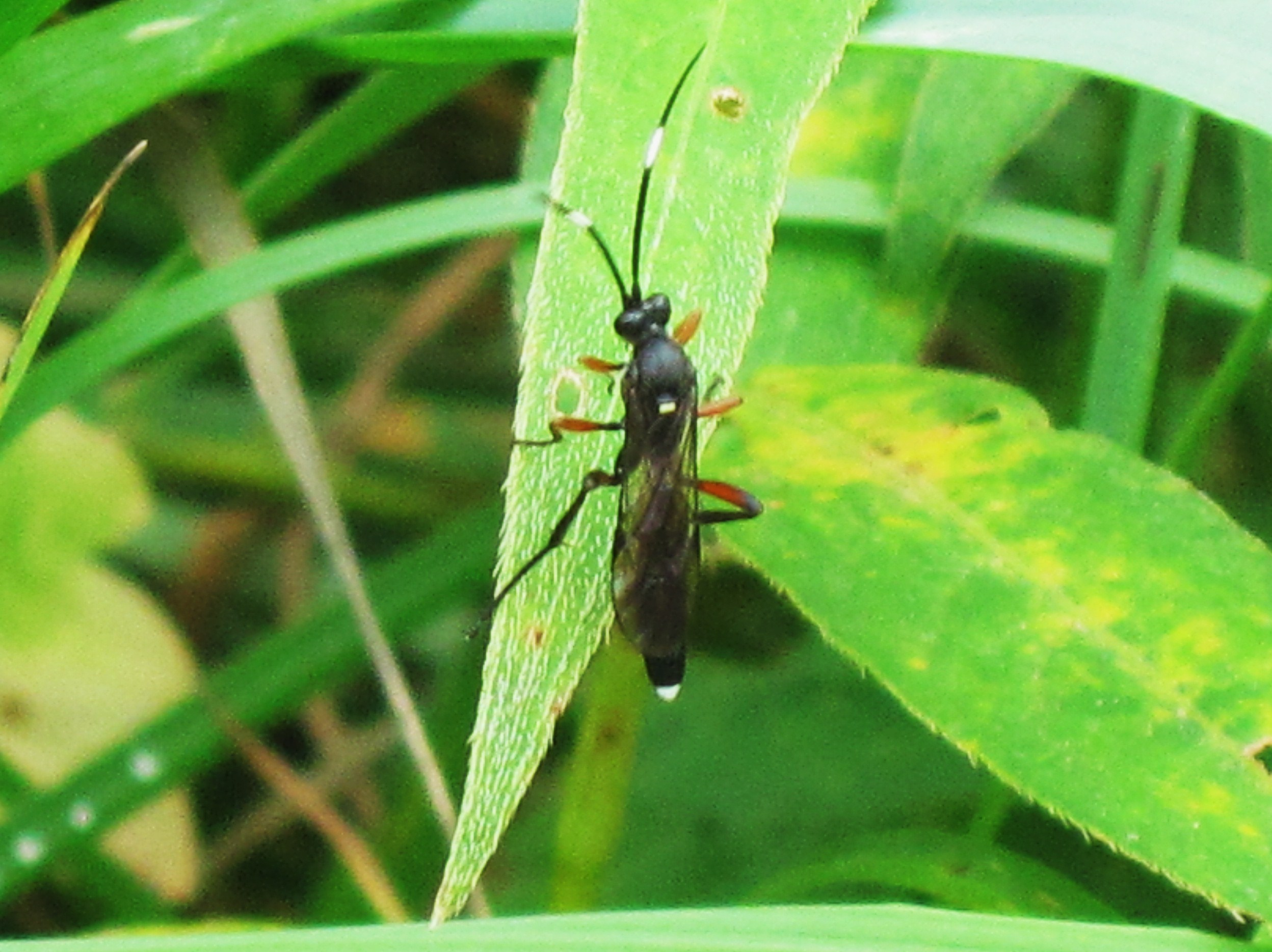

Scientific classification
- Kingdom: Animalia
- Phylum: Arthropoda
- Class: Insecta
- Order: Hymenoptera
- Family: Ichneumonidae
- Genus: Vulgichneumon
- Species: V. saturatorius

Binomial name
- Vulgichneumon saturatorius (Linnaeus, 1758)

= Vulgichneumon saturatorius =

Species of wasp

Vulgichneumon saturatorius is a species of parasitoid wasp in the ichneumonid family.

== Description ==
This is one of many quite similar species. The adult is mainly black, with reddish-brown legs, a white spot on top of the thorax between the wing bases, and a white tip to the abdomen. The antennae are long and dark with a white middle section. V. bimaculatus is similar but with black legs. Some species of Ichneumon and Virgichneumon have similar general appearance.

== Distribution ==
The species is recorded widely across Europe from Ireland, England and Spain in the west, Norway, Sweden and Finland in the north, as far south as Sicily and Sardinia, and east into Romania, Turkey, Ukraine, Russia, and into Asia with records from Kazakhstan and Pakistan. It may be poorly recorded with a wider distribution.

== Behaviour and ecology ==
The species is found in woods and hedges, between April and September (in England). It drinks nectar from flowers of hogweed. The larvae are parasitoids of the caterpillar larvae of the 'Silver Y' moth Autographa gamma and perhaps other species.

== Taxonomy and subspecies ==
The species was named as Ichneumon saturatorius by Carl Linnaeus in the 10th edition of his Systema Naturae in 1758.

A named subspecies is Vulgichneumon saturatorius albivalvus (Uchida, 1926).
