= Craesus =

Scientific classification
- Domain: Eukaryota
- Kingdom: Animalia
- Phylum: Arthropoda
- Class: Insecta
- Order: Hymenoptera
- Suborder: Symphyta
- Family: Tenthredinidae
- Genus: Craesus; Leach, 1817

Genus of sawflies

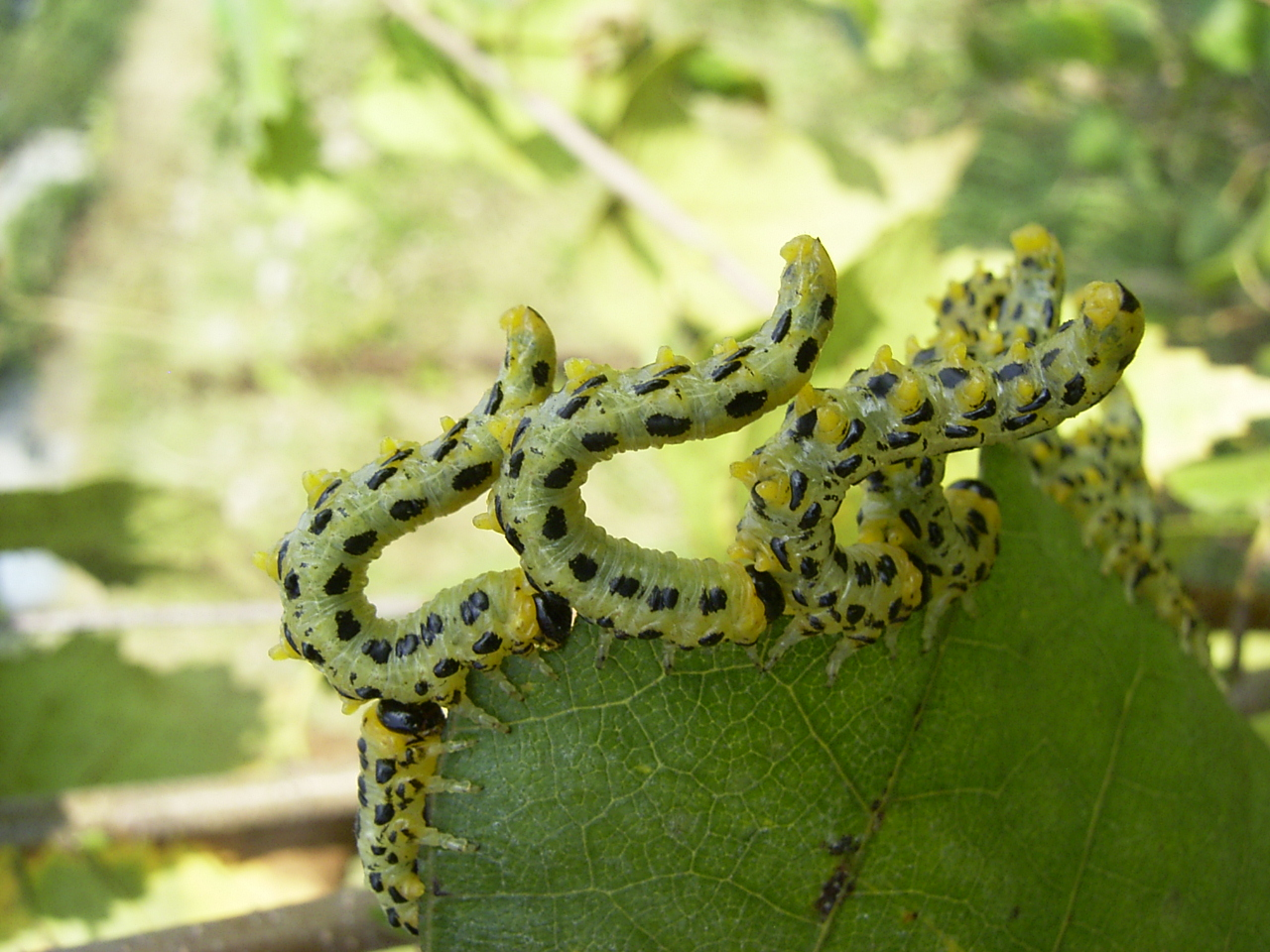
Craesus septentrionalis

Craesus is a genus of insects belonging to the family Tenthredinidae.

The species of this genus are found in Europe and Northern America.

Species:

- Craesus alniastri
- Craesus latipes
- Craesus septentrionalis
