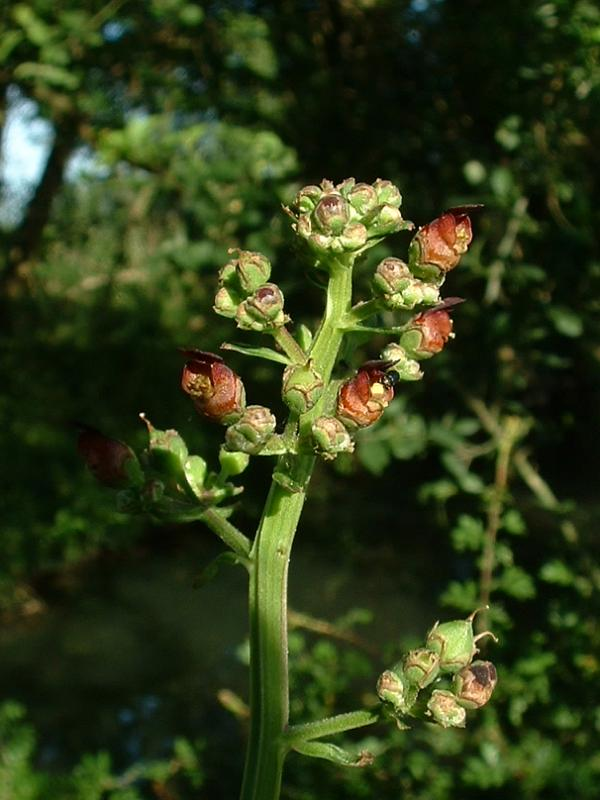

Scientific classification
- Kingdom: Plantae
- Clade: Tracheophytes
- Clade: Angiosperms
- Clade: Eudicots
- Clade: Asterids
- Order: Lamiales
- Family: Scrophulariaceae
- Genus: Scrophularia
- Species: S. auriculata

Binomial name
- Scrophularia auriculata L.

= Scrophularia auriculata =

Species of flowering plant

Scrophularia auriculata, the shoreline figwort or water figwort, is a perennial plant of the genus Scrophularia in the family Scrophulariaceae. It is found commonly in Western Europe and North Africa, on the margins of rivers, ponds and similar damp places. It is an upright plant reaching 70 cm with blunt oval, crenate leaves in alternate pairs on the greenish–purple square stem, most leaves may have two small lobes at their base. The spikes of flowers are held stiffly on square stems which arise from the main stem in the angle of the leaf stalks. The square stems have a wing running down each corner. These wings are more obvious than on the closely related common figwort (Scrophularia nodosa). The flowers are small, maroon-brownish and globular with two small lips above and below. The five sepals are green with a white margin, broader on the water figwort than the common figwort. The plant flowers from June to September (in the northern hemisphere) after when the flowers produce small spherical to pear-shaped capsules containing a large number of seeds.

The name auriculata derives from the auricles at the base of the leaves.

The water figwort is host to the figwort sawfly whose larvae feed on the leaves.

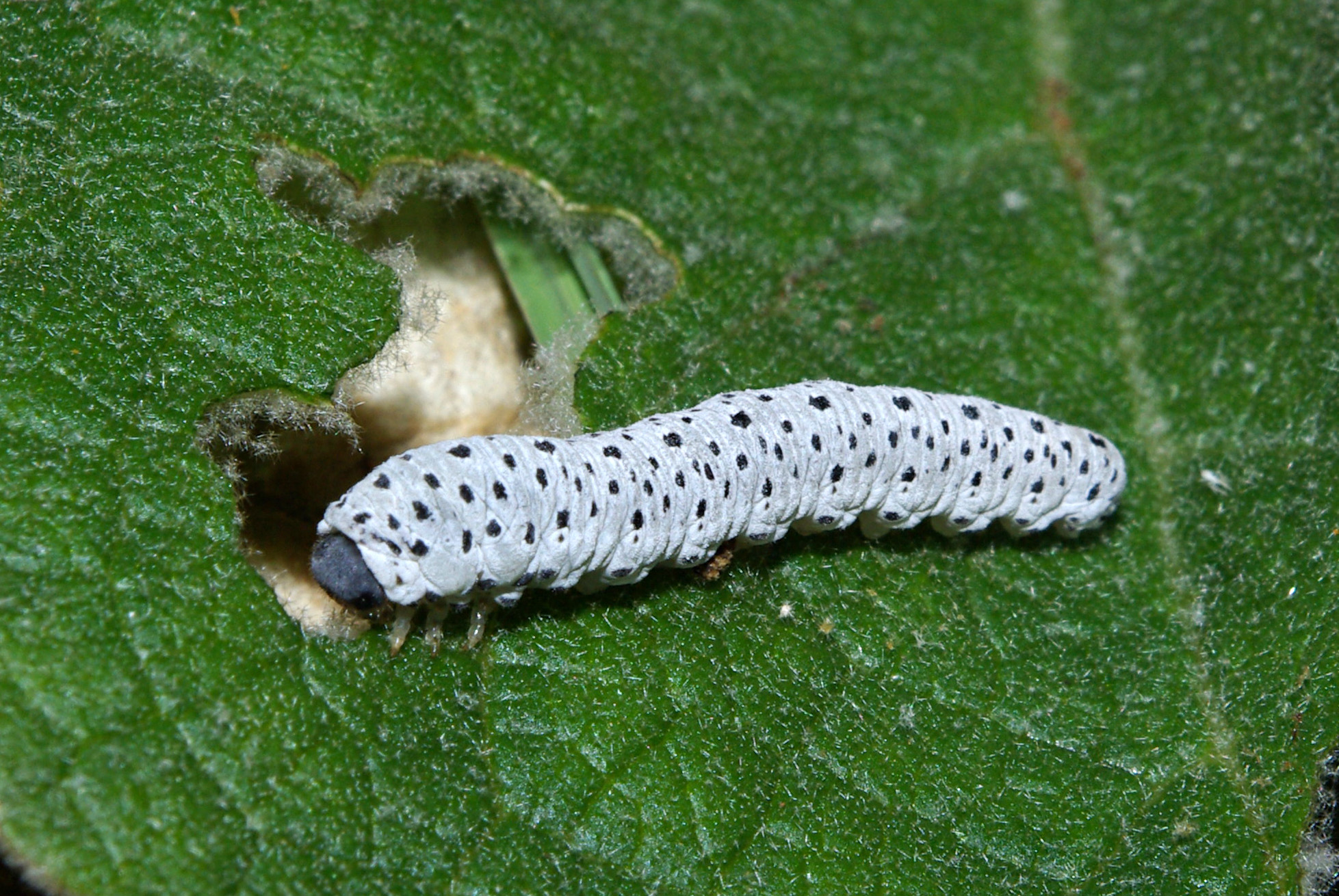
Larva of Tenthredo scrophulariae (figwort sawfly)
