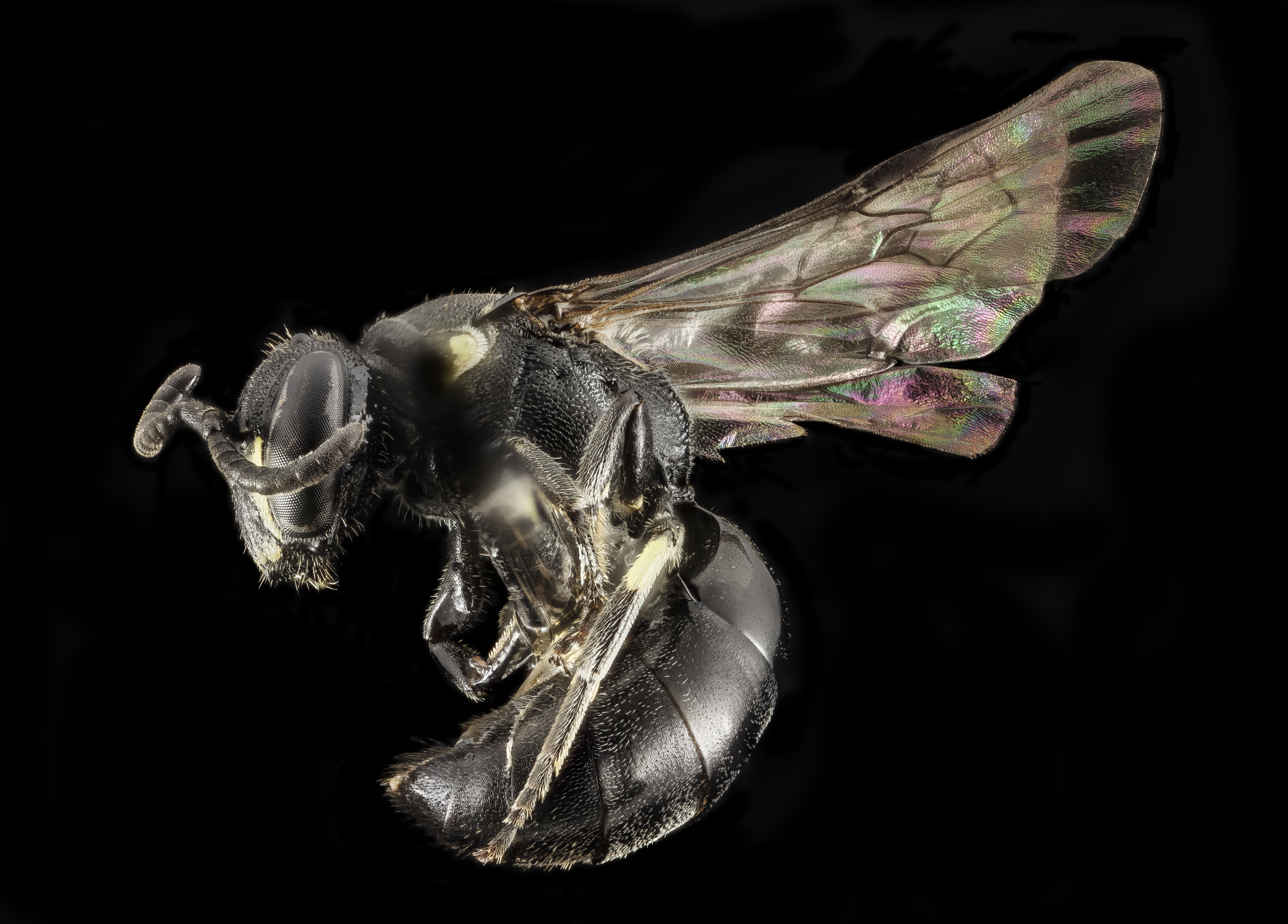

Scientific classification
- Kingdom: Animalia
- Phylum: Arthropoda
- Clade: Pancrustacea
- Class: Insecta
- Order: Hymenoptera
- Family: Colletidae
- Genus: Hylaeus
- Species: H. annulatus

Binomial name
- Hylaeus annulatus (Linnaeus, 1758)

= Hylaeus annulatus =

Species of bee

Hylaeus annulatus, is a species of hymenopteran in the family Colletidae. It is found in North America and Europe.

Hylaeus annulatus relies on specific cavities in standing dead wood for nesting, making the availability of suitable nest sites a critical factor for its population, even though it forages from a wide variety of flowers.
