= Monomorium salomonis =

Scientific classification
- Kingdom: Animalia
- Phylum: Arthropoda
- Class: Insecta
- Order: Hymenoptera
- Family: Formicidae
- Subfamily: Myrmicinae
- Genus: Monomorium
- Species: M. salomonis

Binomial name
- Monomorium salomonis (Linnaeus, 1758)

Synonyms
- Pheidole sulcaticeps

Species of ant

Monomorium salomonis is a species of ant. It is a pest of millets.
