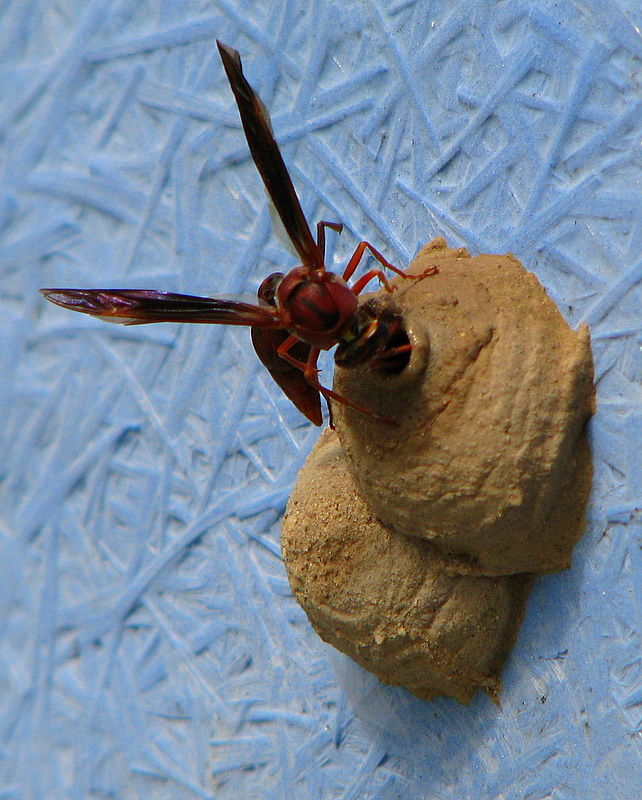

Scientific classification
- Kingdom: Animalia
- Phylum: Arthropoda
- Class: Insecta
- Order: Hymenoptera
- Family: Vespidae
- Genus: Zeta
- Species: Z. argillaceum

Binomial name
- Zeta argillaceum Linnaeus, 1758

= Zeta argillaceum =

Species of wasp

Zeta argillaceum is one of the most common species of potter wasp in South America. It is found throughout the continent and as far north as Mexico and the southern United States (where it is thought to have been accidentally introduced).

This wasp adapts easily to habitat change and the nests are a common sight, often in small groups, attached to the walls of buildings in urban areas. The nest cell is roughly spherical, up to 18 mm in diameter, with a single small entrance hole. A single egg is laid in each cell: the adult wasp stocks the cell with paralyzed living food (usually geometrid moth larvae) for the emerging wasp larva to feed on. The nest is only used once by Z. argillaceum but is often reused by other potter wasps such as Pachodynerus spp.

Zeta argillaceum is often affected by parasitoids such as the eulophid Melittobia australica.
