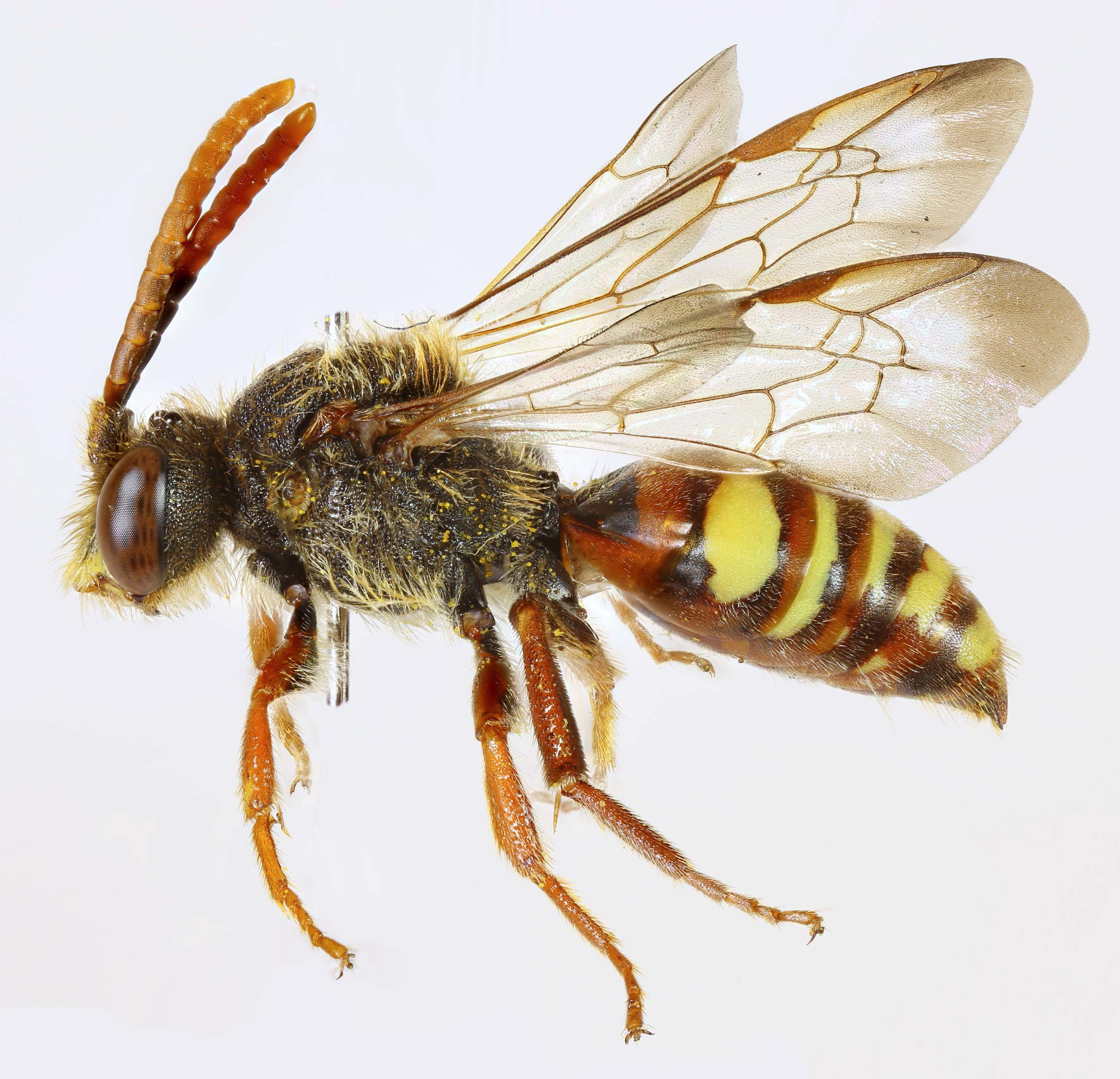
- Nomada ruficornis, Wnion, North Wales

Scientific classification
- Kingdom: Animalia
- Phylum: Arthropoda
- Clade: Pancrustacea
- Class: Insecta
- Order: Hymenoptera
- Family: Apidae
- Subfamily: Nomadinae
- Tribe: Nomadini
- Genus: Nomada
- Species: N. ruficornis

Binomial name
- Nomada ruficornis (Linnaeus, 1758)

= Nomada ruficornis =

Species of bee

Nomada ruficornis is a Palearctic species of nomad bee.

N. ruficornis is found throughout the UK but becomes more scarce further north. Outside of the UK, the distribution extends across the Palearctic to Japan.
