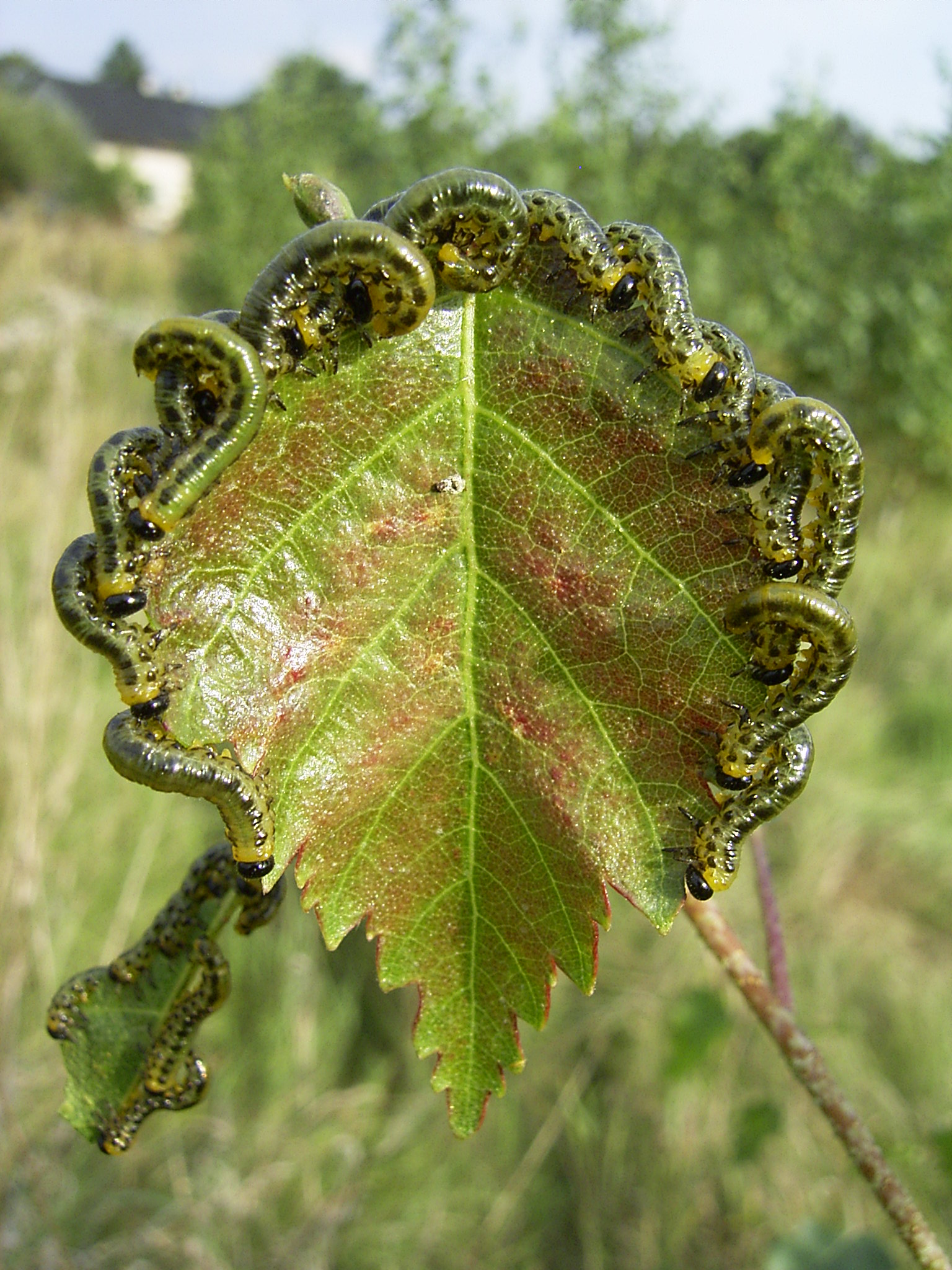
- Larvae on Betula pendula

Scientific classification
- Kingdom: Animalia
- Phylum: Arthropoda
- Clade: Pancrustacea
- Class: Insecta
- Order: Hymenoptera
- Suborder: Symphyta
- Family: Tenthredinidae
- Genus: Craesus
- Species: C. septentrionalis

Binomial name
- Craesus septentrionalis (Linnaeus, 1758)

Synonyms
- Tenthredo septentrionalisLinnaeus, 1758; Craesus stephensii Newman, 1837

= Craesus septentrionalis =

Species of sawfly

Craesus septentrionalis, the flat-legged tenthred or birch sawfly, is a species of insect in the order Hymenoptera, the suborder Symphyta and the family Tenthredinidae. It was first described by Carl Linnaeus in 1758. The adult sawflies are black and brown with transparent wings and the larvae are yellowish-green and resemble caterpillars. The larvae feed on the leaves of various species of deciduous tree.

== Description ==
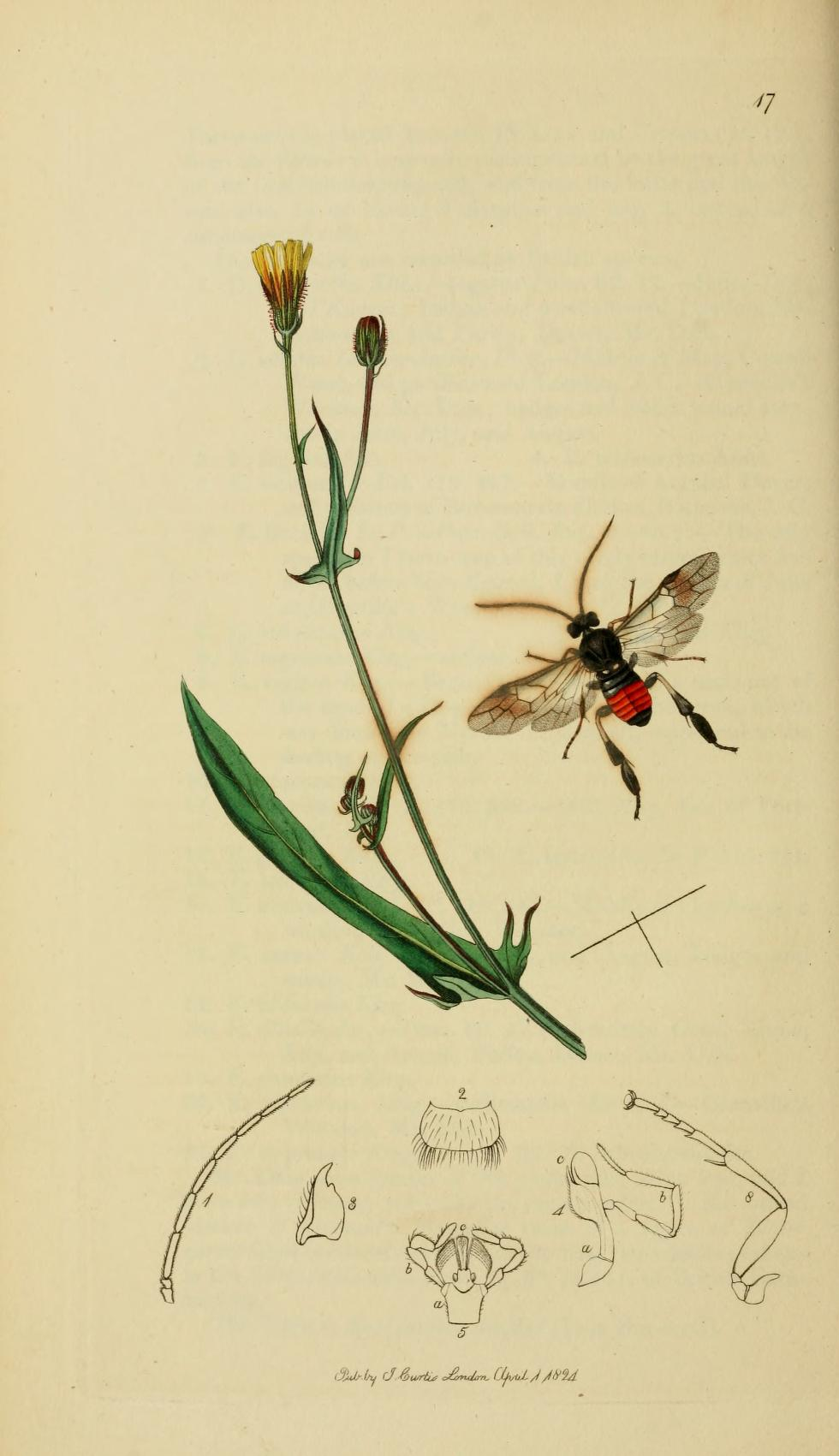
An illustration from British Entomology by John Curtis

The adult Craesus septentrionalis has a black head, thorax and anterior part of the abdomen while the posterior part of the abdomen is chestnut brown. The wings are clear. The legs are broader near the feet than they are close to the body. The larva has a black head, yellow collar and greyish-green slender body with longitudinal rows of black spots.

== Ecology ==
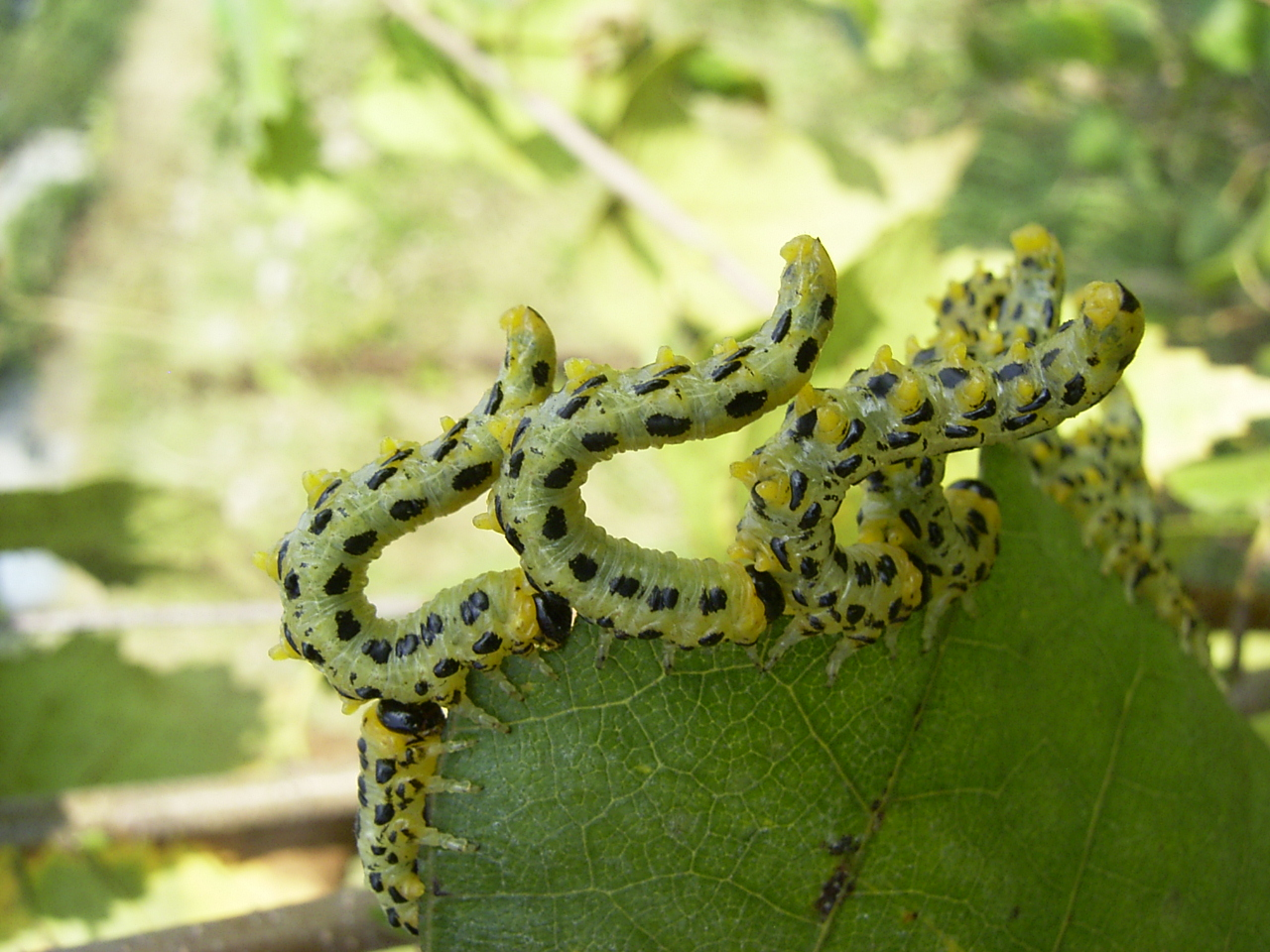
Larvae rearing up defensively

This sawfly lays its eggs on a number of different host trees including alder, ash, birch, hazel, hornbeam, maple, poplar, rowan, wild service tree, whitebeam and willow. The larvae stay together in groups and feed on the margins of leaves. When disturbed, they characteristically cling to the leaf with the front three pairs of legs and curl their bodies upward in a "S" shape. When the larvae are numerous, young trees may be completely defoliated. When mature, the larvae drop to the ground and pupate in the soil. There may be several generations of larvae between spring and autumn and the insect overwinters underground in the pupal state.

The integument of the larvae is easily damaged and oozes hemolymph when it is injured. It is hypothesized that this contains harmful substances, possibly derived from the plant on which the larvae are feeding. The hemolymph was found to repel Myrmica rubra ants, however many vertebrate and invertebrate predators feed on the larvae.
