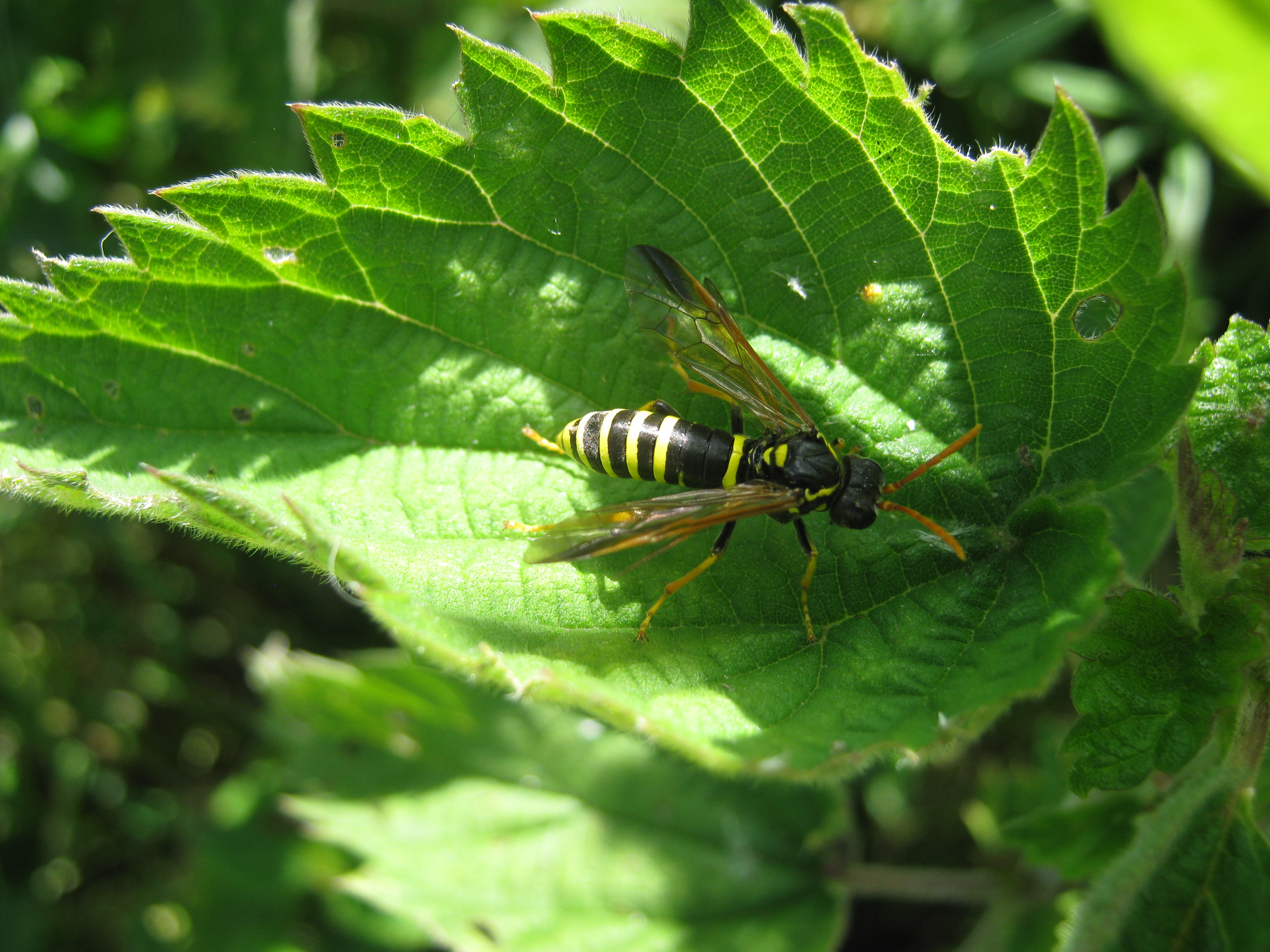

Scientific classification
- Kingdom: Animalia
- Phylum: Arthropoda
- Class: Insecta
- Order: Hymenoptera
- Suborder: Symphyta
- Family: Tenthredinidae
- Genus: Tenthredo
- Species: T. scrophulariae

Binomial name
- Tenthredo scrophulariae Linnaeus, 1758

Synonyms
- Allanthus scrophulariae

= Tenthredo scrophulariae =

Species of sawfly

Tenthredo scrophulariae, the figwort sawfly, is a species of the family Tenthredinidae, subfamily Tenthredininae.

== Distribution and habitat ==
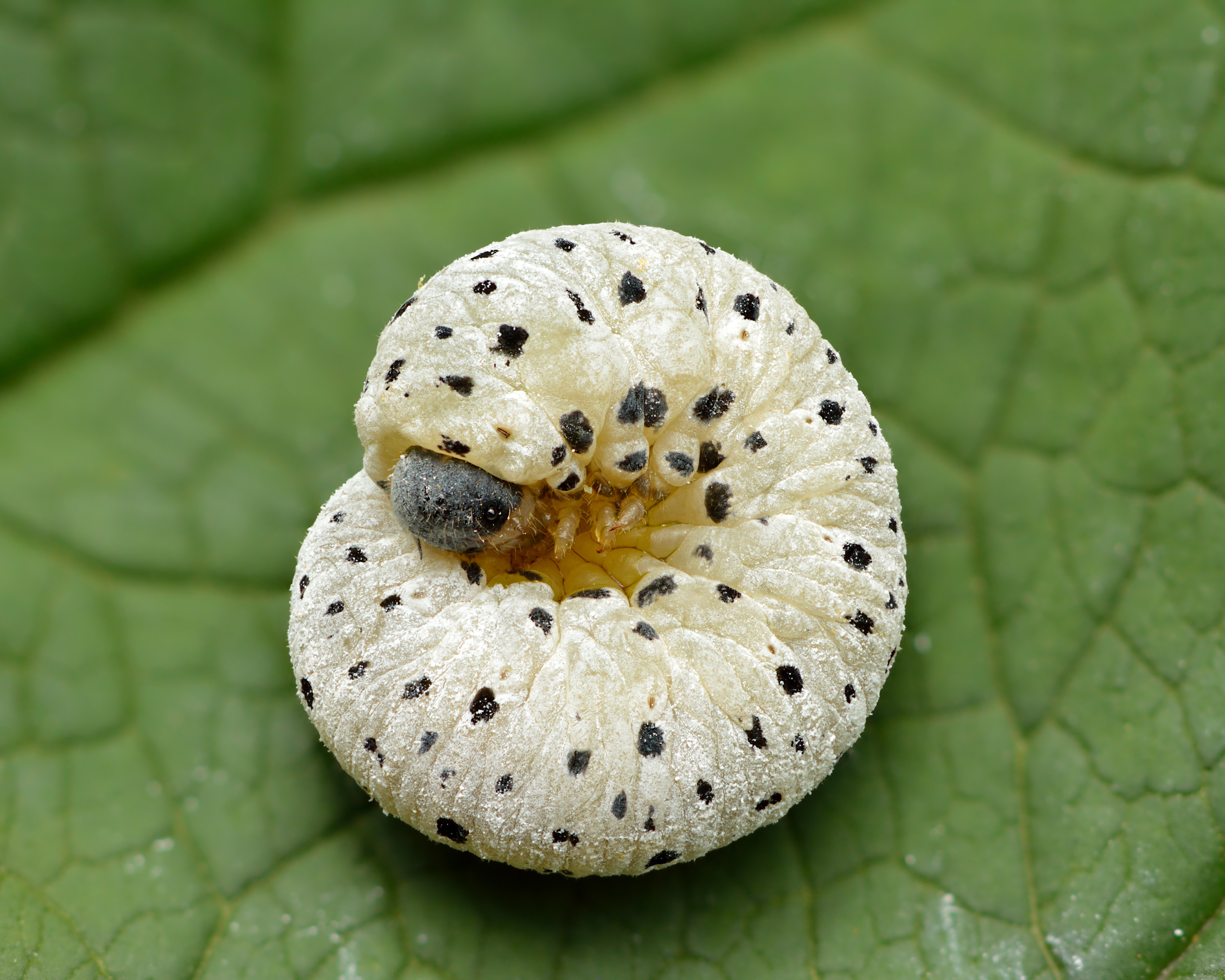
Larva in defensive posture

This species is widespread across Europe, Turkey and Transcaucasia, in meadows wherever figwort grows.

== Description ==
Tenthredo scrophulariae can reach a body length of approximately 11–15 millimetres (0.43–0.59 in). It is easily recognisable by its wasp-like appearance although lacking the thin 'waist' of a true wasp. The head is black and quite short, with prominent, rectangular back corners. The flagellum of the antennae is not narrowed on the tip, it is quite short (less than twice as long as the head width) compared to many related species. It is orange colored, while in most similar species of the genus it is black. The thorax is predominantly black, only the pronotum and scutellum are yellow. The abdomen is black, with transverse bands of yellow.

The leading edge of the forewings, including the veins, is intense orange-red colored, while the remaining wing-membrane is transparent pale yellowish, gray tinted towards the tip. The front legs are almost completely yellow, but the upper sides of the femurs are black. The middle and the rear legs are orange, but the femurs of the rear legs completely black. In the middle leg pair, the femurs may be completely black or with only black rear sides.

The larvae are relatively large, with a length of 30 millimetres (1.2 in) and possessing 22 legs. They have a white body with black spots, and feed on figworts and mullein.

== Biology ==
The larvae feed from August to September. They hibernate on October. The adults are on the wing from May to August of the following year. These sawflies are quite placid and allow close observation. They fly in a lazy style with their long yellow legs hanging down. The adults feed on small insects and can be often found on umbellifers (Heracleum sphondylium), feeding on nectar and pollen. The larvae feed primarily on leaves of figwort (Scrophularia).

They also occur on Buddleja and on black mullein (Verbascum nigrum), where they feed only on the less hairy, older leaves.

The larvae are parasitized by various parasitoid species of Ichneumonidae (Mesoleptidea prosoleuca and Euceros serricornis).

== Gallery ==
Mating behavior with aggressive competition between males

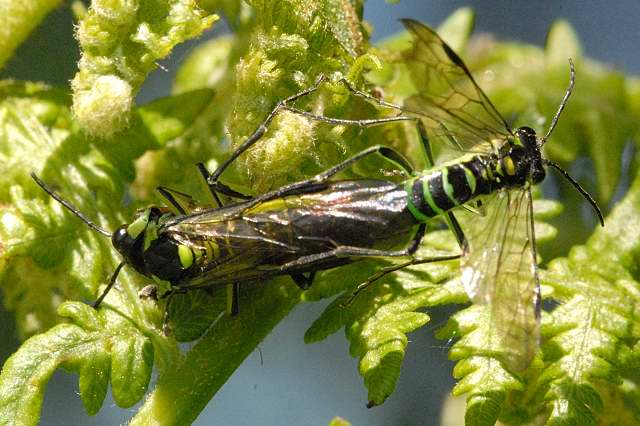
Mating

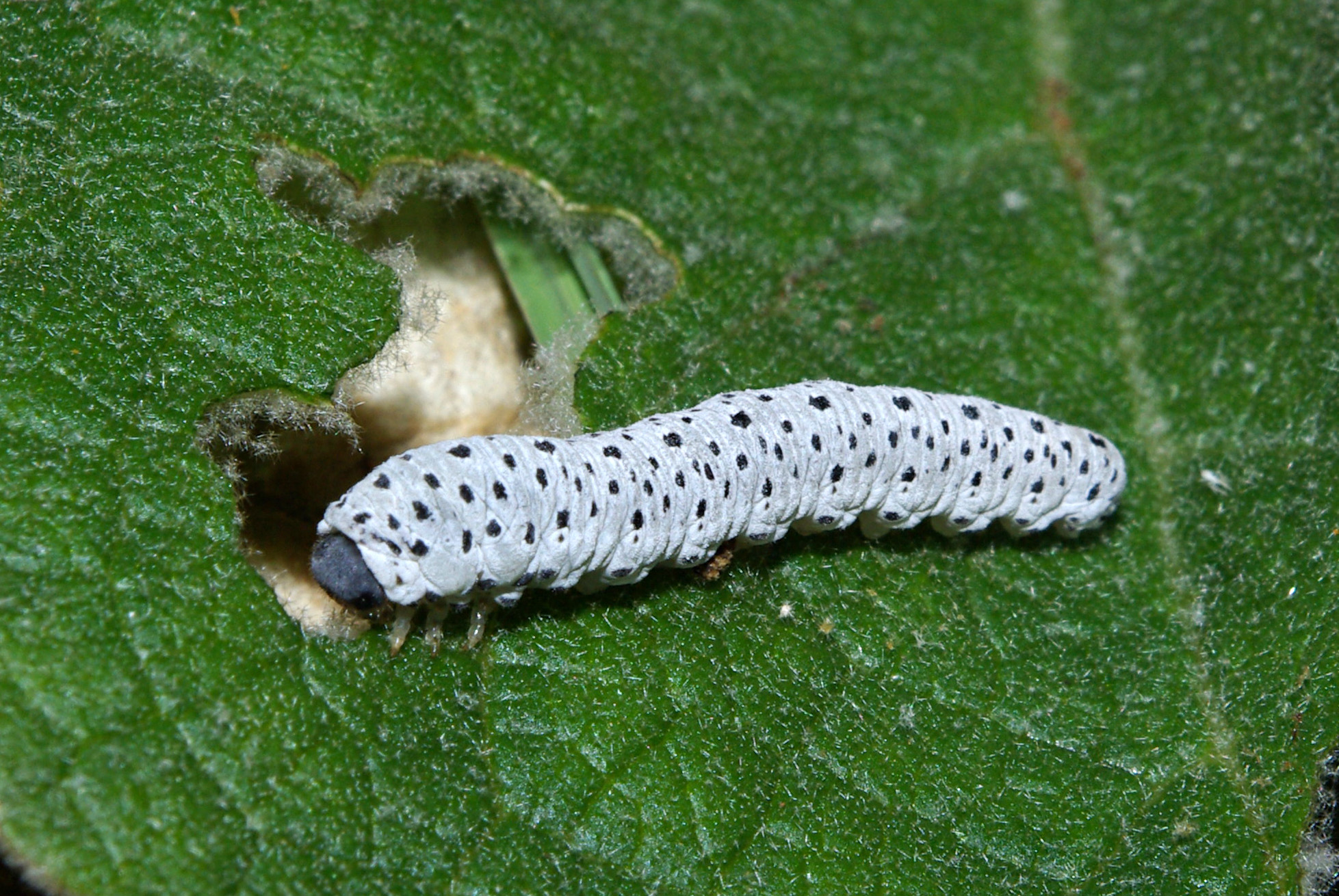
Larva

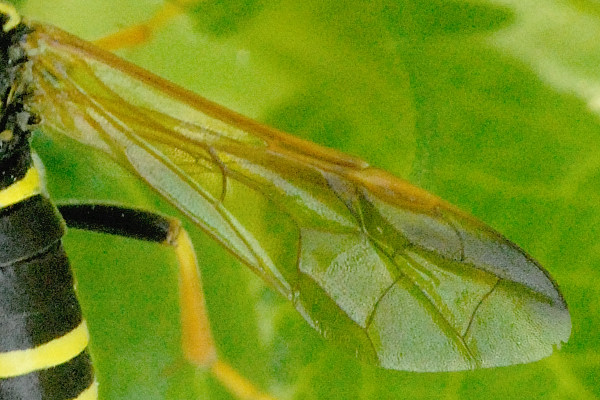
Close-up on a wing

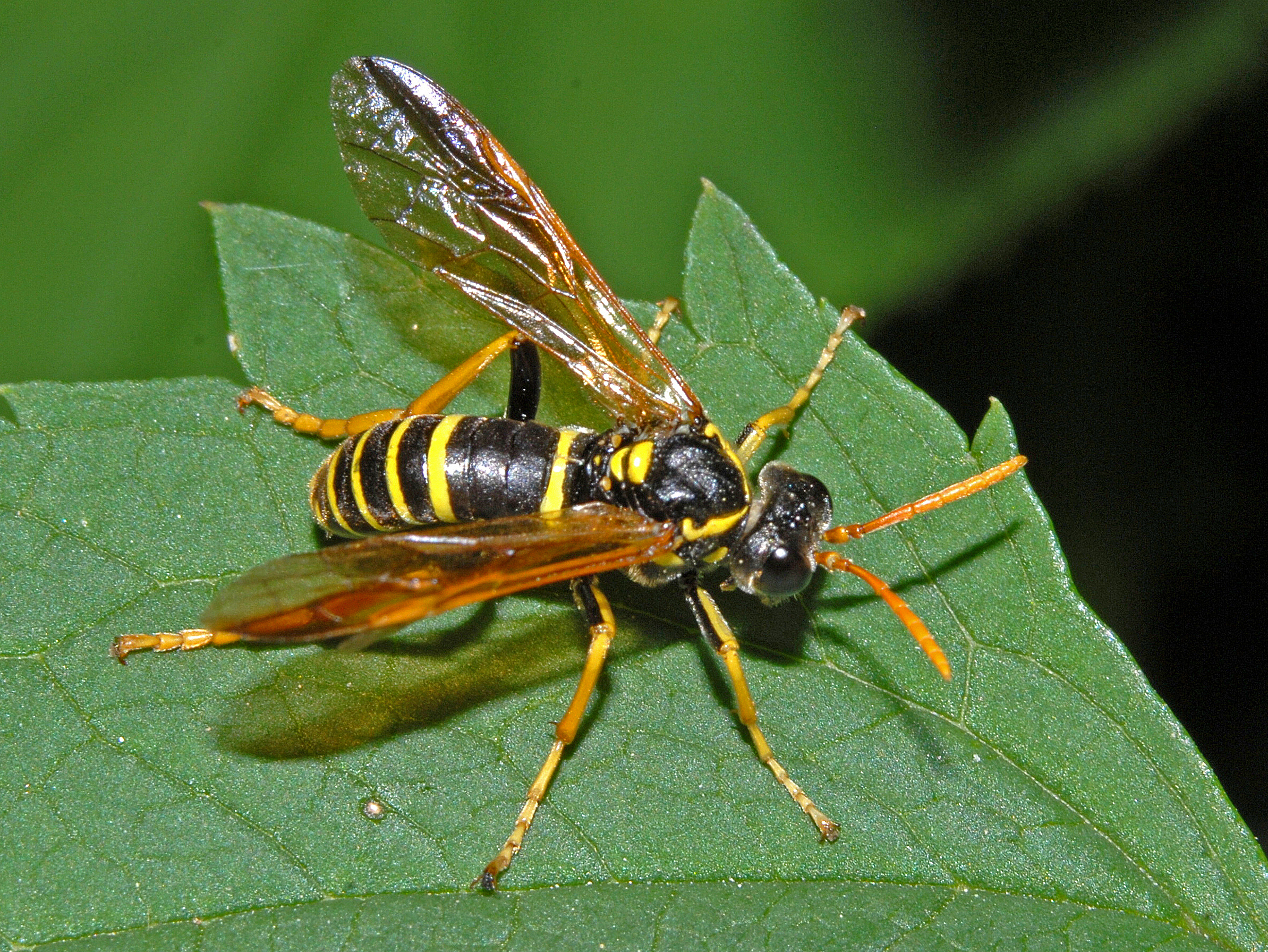
Imago
