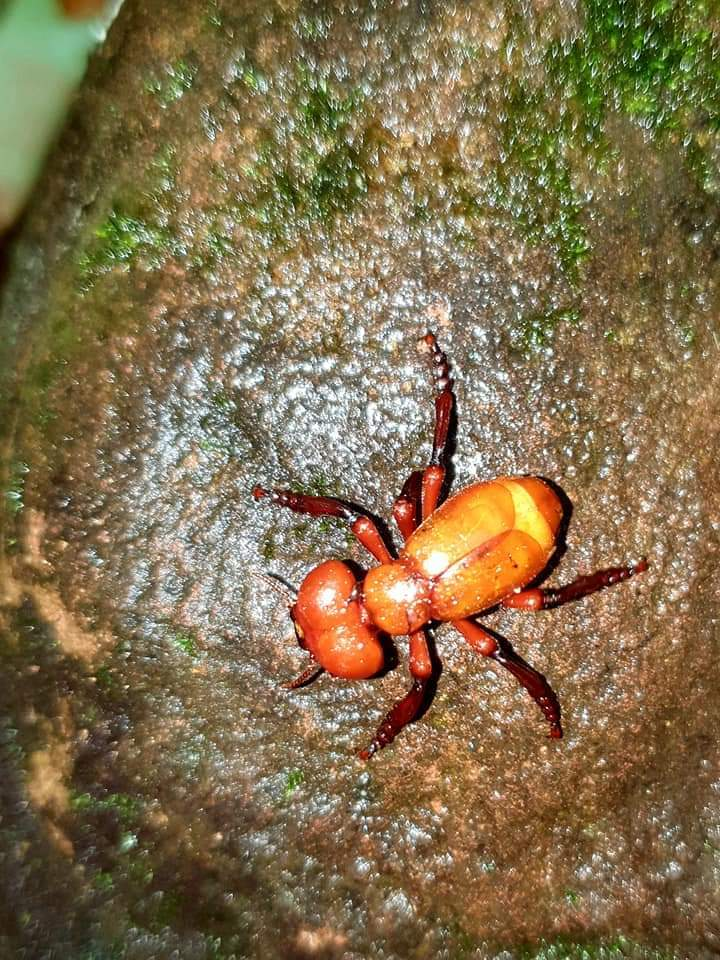

Scientific classification
- Kingdom: Animalia
- Phylum: Arthropoda
- Class: Insecta
- Order: Coleoptera
- Suborder: Polyphaga
- Infraorder: Cucujiformia
- Family: Meloidae
- Genus: Meloetyphlus
- Species: M. fuscatus

Binomial name
- Meloetyphlus fuscatus Waterhouse, 1872

= Meloetyphlus fuscatus =

Species of insect

Meloetyphlus fuscatus, the blind blister beetle, is a species of blister beetle in the family Meloidae found in Central and South America. They are kleptoparasites of orchid bees and are entirely blind as adults. Unique among meloids, females do not lay their eggs near flowers, but rather within their hosts' nests.

== Description and etymology ==
=== Description ===
Meloetyphlus fuscatus is a blind, dull, and robust blister beetle. The eyeless head is larger than is typical for blister beetles and provides more attachment area for mandibular muscles (this head shape is only observed once elsewhere in Meloidae, in the tribe Horiini). Length ranges from 12 to 17mm; males are typically larger and have more strongly modified legs than females.

=== Etymology ===
The generic and specific names derive from Meloe + Greek τῠφλός (tuphlós) for blind, and Latin fusco for dusky.

== Life history ==
=== Life cycle ===
The life cycle of M. fuscatus begins when an adult female oviposits in an empty cell of its host's nest. The triungulins hatch within 20 day after oviposition and immediately set off looking for a provisioned bee nest to parasitize. This can be accomplished by attaching to a female bee to gain access to her nest. If a female emerges in a cell near that of the triungulins, they will attach to her. But in the instance of a male emerging near the triungulins, they will attach to him and transfer to a female during mating. Once a triungulin has infiltrated an active nest cell and the cell is sealed off, it will proceed to eat the bee egg and pollen privisions of that cell. After the triungulin pupates, it uses its strongly modified forelegs and mandibles to dig out of the sealed cell and look for a mate. Adult M. fuscatus do not feed, and the fecundity of females is determined by the amount of nutrition consumed as an immature.

=== Host species ===
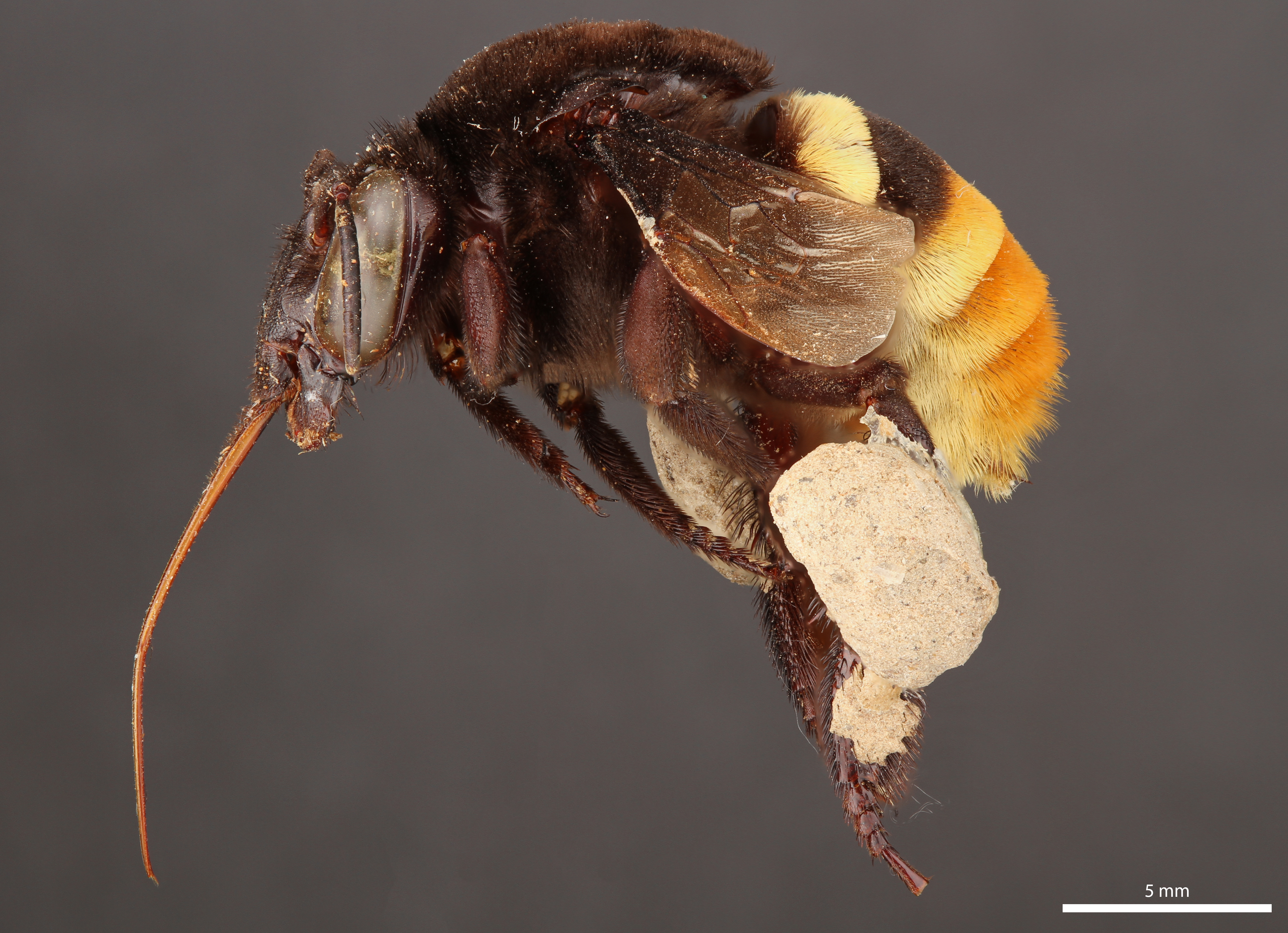
Eulaema cingulata

Meloetyphlus fuscatus is a kleptoparasite of three orchid bee genera: Eufriesea, Eulaema, and Exaerete

Known host species:

- Eufriesea dentilabris
- Eufriesea violacea
- Eulaema cingulata
- Eulaema helvola
- Eulaema meriana
- Eulaema mocsaryi
- Eulaema nigrita
- Eulaema polychroma
- Eulaema seabrai
- Eulaema terminata
- Exaerete smaragdina

== Range and habitat ==
=== Range ===
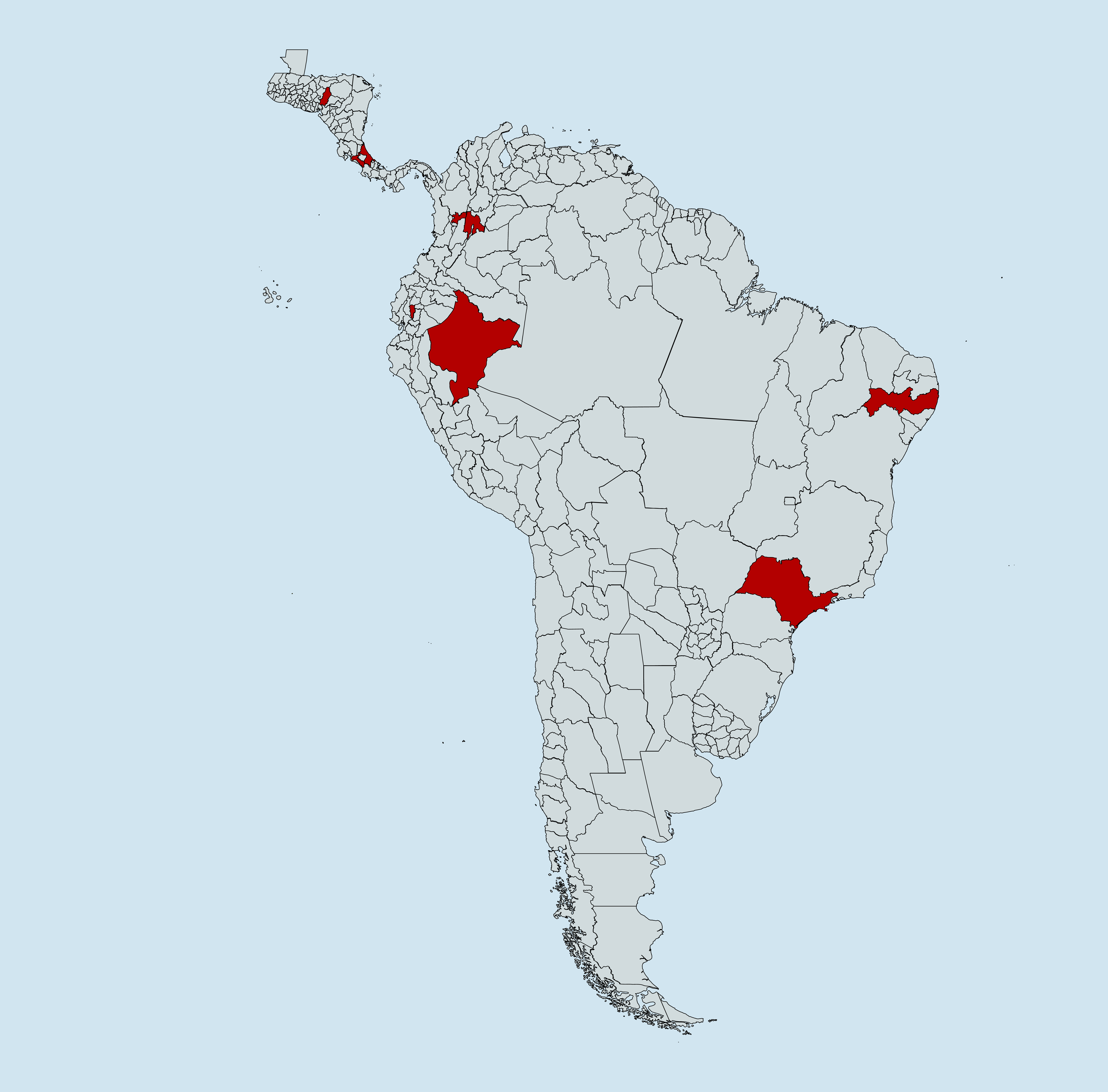
Records of M. fuscatus as of October 2021

To date, M. fuscatus has been recorded in:

- Honduras: Francisco Morazán
- Costa Rica: Limón, San José
- Colombia: Caldas, Cundinamarca
- Ecuador: Bolívar
- Trinidad
- Peru: Loreto
- Brazil: Pernambuco, São Paulo, Ceará

=== Habitat ===
Adults are found in, on, or vicinal to their host's nest. Triungulins are found in their host's nest or on the host.
