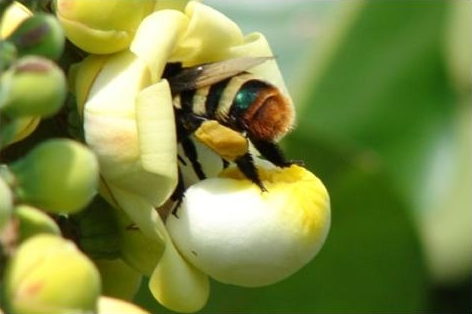
- Eulaema meriana female on a flower of the Brazil nut tree (Bertholletia excelsa)

Scientific classification
- Kingdom: Animalia
- Phylum: Arthropoda
- Clade: Pancrustacea
- Class: Insecta
- Order: Hymenoptera
- Family: Apidae
- Genus: Eulaema
- Species: E. meriana

Binomial name
- Eulaema meriana (Olivier, 1789)
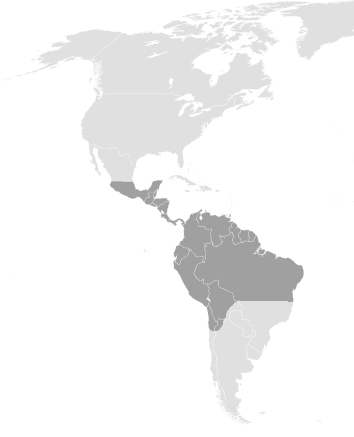

Synonyms
- Apis meriana Olivier, 1789; Euglossa dimidiata Latreille, 1809; Eulaema dimidiata Lepeletier, 1841

= Eulaema meriana =

Species of bee

Eulaema meriana, also known as Merian's orchid bee, is a large-bodied bee species in the tribe Euglossini, otherwise known as the orchid bees. The species is a solitary bee and is native to tropical Central and South America. The male collects fragrances from orchid flowers, which it stores in hollows in its hind legs. Orchids can be deceptive by mimicking the form of a female and her sex pheromone, thus luring male bees or wasps. Pollination will take place as the males attempt to mate with the labellum, or the tip petal of the flower. Male E. meriana are territorial and have a particular perch on a tree trunk where it displays to attract a female. After mating, the female builds a nest with urn-shaped cells made with mud, feces, and plant resin, and provisions these with nectar and pollen before laying an egg in each. These bees also have complex foraging and wing buzzing behaviors and are part of a mimicry complex.

== Description ==
Eulaema meriana resembles a bumblebee in appearance and is covered in short dense hairs. At first glance Eulaema bees look like large bumblebee queens. They are relatively large bees with faint metallic colorations. The head of the bee is black, and the thorax brownish black with a large, glossy black scutellum. Their abdomen is black with three transverse pale yellowish bands on the anterior half, and the posterior third is reddish brown. E. meriana also possess membranous wings that are dark at the base and paler at the tips. The legs are black and the tibia of the hind legs are much thicker. Males possess hollows on their hind legs, while females have pollen baskets. In general, the species have long tongues that are thought to be an evolutionary adaptation that favors nectar collection. The large body size is thought to allow the bees to fly in cooler, rainy conditions and continue foraging. It has also been suggested that the larger body size can help them forage for longer distances.

=== Taxonomy and phylogeny ===
Eulaema meriana is part of the order Hymenoptera, which includes ants, bees, wasps, and sawflies.

E. meriana is part of the tribe Euglossini within the subfamily Apinae of the family Apidae. Euglossini are part of a group known as corbiculate bees, a group that also includes honey bees, stingless bees, and bumble bees. Members of this group have concave hind legs ("corbiculae") that are used for transportation of materials used in nest construction and cell provisioning.

Orchid bees do not include advanced social species, in contrast to the other corbiculate Apinae, that form colonies with morphologically discrete queen and worker castes.

Orchid bees are considered to be key species in lowland forests because they are pollinators of specific tropical plants, especially orchids. It is in fact the males that perform cross-pollination. They have also been targets of conservation, and the diversity of the euglossine bees as a whole is being affected by habitat fragmentation. E. meriana is closely related to its sister species, E. bombiformis.

=== Distribution ===
Eulaema meriana is native to Panama, Colombia, Venezuela, the Guianas, Ecuador, Peru, Bolivia and Brazil. It is found in forests in the Amazon basin but is replaced in the Atlantic coastal forest by Eulaema niveofasciata and Eulaema flavescens. The genus Eulaema itself ranges from Mexico to northern Argentina.

== Nests ==
=== General nest architecture ===
Nest entrances have a mud wall or ceiling at the entry point, with a very narrow entrance hole (about 15 mm in diameter). The nests contain a pedicel made out of mud, and a number of urn-shaped brood cells fused together. The pedicel increases in size as the overall size of the nest increases as well. The pedicel is built first and its anterior surface is what forms the back of the first brood cell, which is made of a thick layer of mud and has an average volume around 4.8mL. Cell structures have been observed to be similar across nests. Each cell is fused to the wall of the previous cell, and new cells are often observed to be attached along the same plane. The cells are then covered with a thin layer of feces and lined with resin that is extended past the opening to form a collar. After oviposition by the female, the resin collar is pushed inward by the female and then covered with a layer of mud. In larger nests, once a layer of cells is complete, the surface is covered with mud to make a new floor for the next layer of cells to be built.

=== Nest initiation and construction ===
After mating, a female usually chooses a cavity as its nesting site. If the entrance is too large, a mud wall about 8-9mm thick may first be built in which a hole about 1.5 cm (0.6 in) in diameter is made. The mud is gathered in small balls by the mandibles, transferred progressively to the fore, mid and hind legs, and deposited in the pollen basket on the hind leg. About six balls make a load, three in each basket and the female flies back to the nest site. Inside the cavity, a pedicel is constructed on which an urn-shaped cell is built. The mud hardens as it dries.

Initiation of a nest begins with mud collection for the mud wall, entrance, pedicel, and first brood cell. This process can take up to four days. Therefore, all trips on the very first day of nest construction are devoted to mud collection. After the first brood cell is nearly complete, the female will begin to collect both mud and resin, which will be used to line the cell on the second day. After the cell is lined, almost no mud is collected on the third day. A female will spend almost three quarters of her time foraging for larval food collection, and the rest for resin collection. Once the brood cell is complete, oviposition will occur, the collar will be pushed in, and the cell will be covered with mud. The construction of additional cells follows a similar timeline, although there is less mud collection now that the mud wall and entrance have been built. It was noted by Cameron and Ramirez in a study done on the nest architecture of the E. meriana that less time was required to build successive cells after the first. Some nests were also observed to be reused. Clusters of older cells and decomposing females were found in some of the cells, covered with a layer of mud.

=== Brood cell construction ===
Each brood cell is filled two-thirds of its volume with a pale yellow, sticky pollen/nectar mixture. Females returning to the nest with this sticky substance attached to their corbiculae deposit it into the only open brood cell. The female E. meriana follow a specific ritual after placing this pollen mixture into a cell. They make a rotation with the posterior part of the body inside the cell and forelegs around the resin collar. It is suggested that this allows the pollen mixture to be pushed down and packed into the cell. Other materials like mud, feces, and resin are deposited in the nest. Mud and feces can be found deposited on the floor of the nest, while resin is stuck onto a cavity wall near the pedicel.

While the actual size of the nest cavity varied in the study conducted by Cameron and Ramirez, the brood cells of all the nests studied were uniform in size, shape, and structure. The cell structures were also similar to the cells built by other Eulaema species.

== Colonies ==
Eulaema meriana typically begin nests alone, and they remain solitary. Occasionally they form parasocial colonies with two or more females that are from the same generation and may even be sisters.

Females work inside the nest at night, constructing cells and ovipositing. One egg is laid in each provisioned cell, and oviposition occurs after the provisions are tamped into the cell. Egg laying happens quickly as the female backs into the cell, holding the collar with her forelegs and inserting her posterior end into the cell. After laying the egg, the female pushes the resin collar in and spends a few hours covering the cell with mud. After this, the female begins to work on building a new brood cell.

Larger nests can have multiple females. Females may use the same site over many generations and continuously build upon the nest. In one large nest studied in Ecuador consisting of 76 cells, two females were found together in the nest for at least 17 days. One of the females carried pollen nectar loads on her corbicula and deposited it into the only open cell. A second female carried mud, covering dead females with mud and working on the nest construction. This suggests some level of social plasticity among these solitary bees.

For single female nests, each cluster of cells represents the reproductive output for one female. One female on average will construct and oviposit over four or five brood cells before disappearing and leaving the nest. Egg development is rather long, with adults observed to be emerging 100–165 days after oviposition.

== Pollination ==
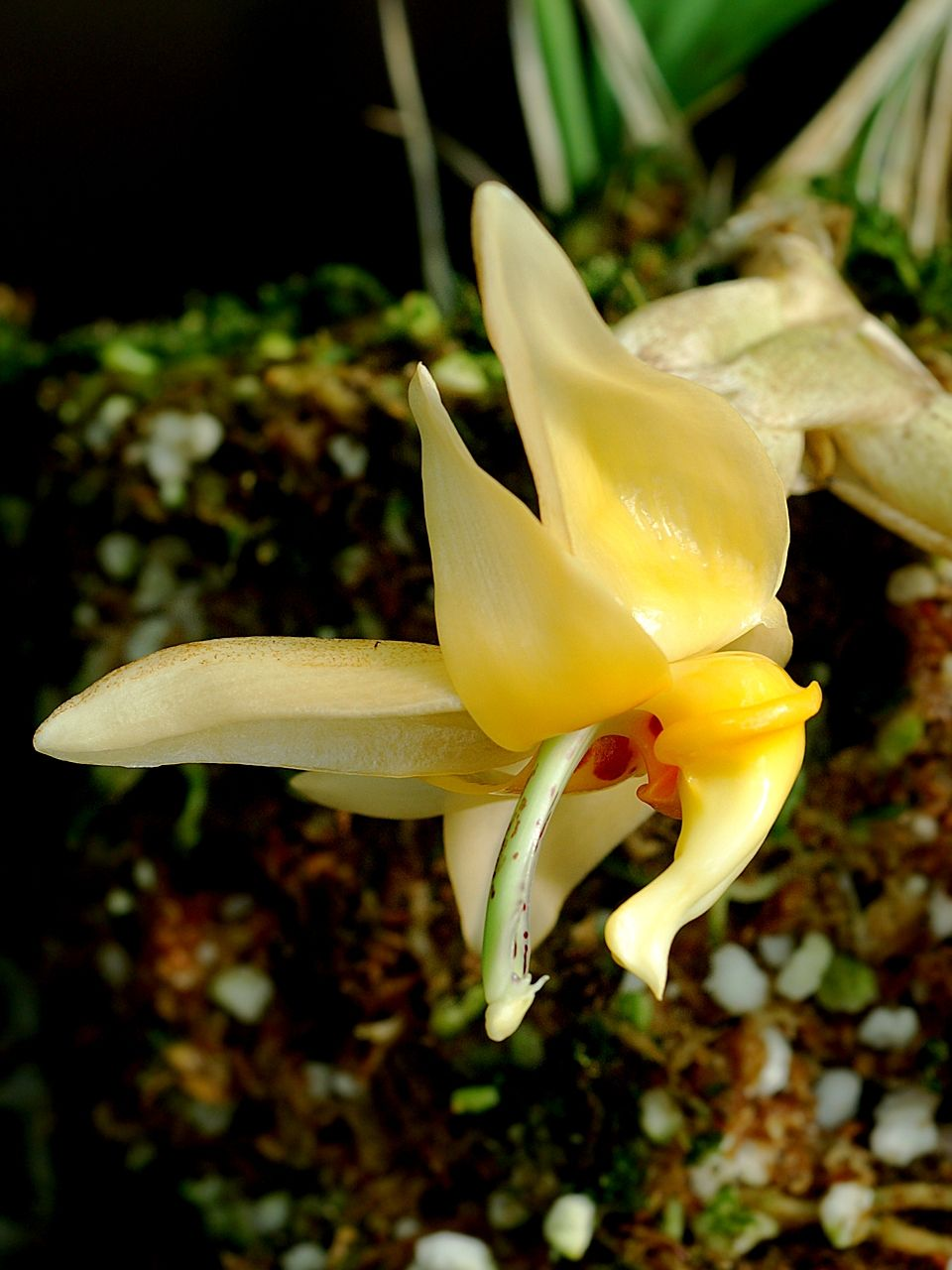
Stanhopea avicula orchid flower

As in other species of orchid bee, both the male and female visit flowers to feed on nectar. Besides this, the male has a mutualistic relationship with one or more species of orchid. To persuade the male to visit its flowers, the orchid produces fragrances of a particular chemical composition attractive to a specific species of bee that is exactly the right size and shape to pollinate the flower. Stanhopea orchids are mostly pollinated by large Eulaema bees, Euglossa species often being too small for the purpose. In more primitive species in the genus Eulaema, the orchid pollinium, a packet of pollen, adheres to the male bee as it reverses out of the flower having collected the fragrance. In more advanced species, there is a fall-through mechanism in which the bee loses its footing on some oil droplets while collecting the fragrance and the pollinium adheres to the bee as it slithers out of the flower. E. meriana has been observed visiting Stanhopea florida and pollinating Stanhopea candida, Stanhopea costaricensis and Stanhopea tricornis. It also pollinates Catasetum macrocarpum and Notylia pentachne. It is also the only bee species thus far reliably documented as a pollinator of a species of Vanilla – Vanilla grandiflora. In a study to identify which insects pollinated the flowers of the Brazil nut tree (Bertholletia excelsa), it was found that the flowers were visited by a number of bee species, including E. meriana, which visited the tree early in the day. Both males and females were observed collecting nectar from the base of the flower's lower lip. The study concluded that E. meriana played a part in the pollination of the Brazil nut flowers but that other bee species, Eulaema mocsaryi and Xylocopa frontalis, were of greater importance, thus E. meriana are not required to pollinate Brazil nut flowers. Nevertheless, in commercial Brazil nut tree plantations, successful pollination depends on the plantation being surrounded by intact primary forest with its epiphytic orchid population to supply a sufficient number of pollinating bees for the large number of flowers.

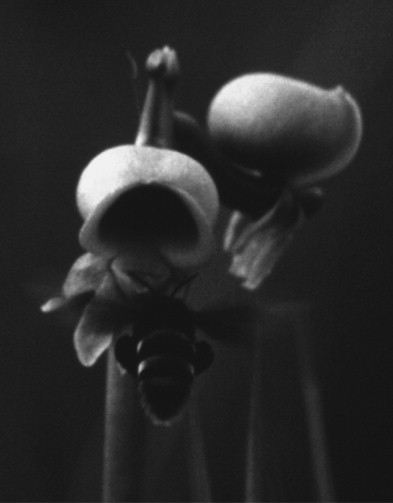
Male Eulaema hovering around the Catasetum discolor orchid.

=== Fragrance collection ===
Male orchid bees have a large hind tibia with pouches where they store fragrances. Adult male bees spend much of their time filling their pouch with the volatile fragrances found at orchid flowers. This behavior has given rise to the “pollination syndrome”, where males pollinate about 650 orchid species. They apply lipids to these fragrances, and the compounds are collected and stored in the hind tibia with movements involving their entire legs. The fragrances stay in the pouch for a long period of time and form a complex chemical blend. The blends are species specific, and are commonly hypothesized to be used for intraspecific communication in courtship. To the right is a picture of a male Eulaema hovering around the Catasetum discolor orchid.

== Wing buzzing ==
Males showed increased wing buzzing during each perching session on a tree when they were more active during the day and when ambient temperature was higher. During perching, the male E. meriana grabs the tree with his mandibles and extends his hind legs while sweeping his wings back and forth rapidly. Scientists have suggested three hypotheses to explain the behavioral purposes of the increased wing buzzing.

=== Visual attraction hypothesis ===
Some suggest that the bi-colored (half black, half shiny) wings flash the black and yellow abdomen, which could attract females. Others believe that the abdomen is always visible during buzzing due to the angle of the abdomen and the wings, so it is unlikely that the colors of the abdomen are a signal to females.

=== Thermoregulation hypothesis ===
Additionally, the buzzing itself is not loud, and is also unlikely to serve as a signal to other members of the species. David L. Stern instead suggests that these territorial males are cooling their body down by buzzing their wings. The males could be thermally stressed because they fly and hover at lower speeds around their territory compared to when they forage, resulting in lower levels of heat loss from the bee. The wing buzzing could be a behavioral mechanism that helps cool the bee in tropical climates as a form of thermoregulation. Moreover, sunlit territories can also elevate the body temperature of the bee. Therefore, a mechanism like wing buzzing could be important to help the bee cool off. Males were not observed to be active when the ambient temperature was greater than 28.5° Celsius.

Others hypothesize that wing buzzing could also serve to disperse fragrances during a mating display.

=== Chemical attraction hypothesis ===
Eulaema meriana have jugal combs. It is present in both sexes, but on females it is much smaller. On males, the jugal comb is large in comparison to its body, and under a stereoscope, scientists were able to determine that the jugal comb can be moved across the middle tibial tufts. A research group led by Bembé in Germany observed that when the jugal comb was moved across a tibial tuft moistened with water, they observed fine aerosol clouds being sprayed off. They suggested that males can spray fragrances from their mid tibial tufts by vibrating their hind wings, and postulated this spraying to be a part of their courtship displays. Thus, another hypothesis on the purpose of wing buzzing is that the wing vibration could attract other Euglossini.

== Behavior ==
=== Foraging activities ===
Females forage for pollen, nectar, resin, mud, and feces. These materials are packed in the corbiculae and brought back to the nest. Pollen and nectar foraging trips are on average longer than other resource trips. Mud collecting usually takes only a few minutes while pollen and nectar collecting could take up to two hours. Collection times for different materials are also very specific. The female bees collect pollen and nectar from dawn to around noon, while mud, feces, and resin were collected mostly in the afternoon. E. meriana are diurnal, limiting foraging to periods between dawn and dusk.

=== Mating behavior ===
==== Territoriality and transiency ====
The euglossine bees, also commonly known as “orchid bees”, are best known for the male bees’ collection and attraction of fragrance produced by orchids and other flowers. The exact role of fragrances in the mating system remains unclear, as they are not observed to use them in an obvious manner to attract females or mark their territory. After emergence as an adult, males spend much of their time searching for nectar and fragrances. They can also be found defending territories where mating will sometimes occur.

In a four-month study of male territoriality conducted by Stern, E. meriana males showed two alternative behaviors of territoriality and transiency. Transient male bees did not defend territories, but instead flew from one territory to the other. They also did not engage in physical contact with the territorial males. On the other hand, territorial males patrolled an area around a tree and used the same territory for up to 49 days. It also appeared that they gave up territories to new males without violence.

Males defend territories solely for mating, and no other resources such as fragrances, nests, nest construction materials, nectar, or pollen are found at these territories. According to Stern's observations on male behavior, transient males hover around a territory while facing the territorial male, and then descend slowly. They will then fly up to the same level as the territorial male and interact with each other, flying around a territory with one bee seeming to chase the other without any physical contact. The territorial male was observed to fly in a zig-zag pattern consistently before the transient male left, whereupon the territorial male would resume its normal patrolling of his area. Male bees could switch from territoriality to transiency.

Territory occupancy was not statistically observed to be dependent on tree diameter, but when territories of bees were observed and noted, trees with a diameter between 40–70 cm were observed to be used more than 20% of the time. The closely related male Eulaema bombiformis prefers trees with a mean diameter of 15.5 cm. Stern suggests this may serve as a reproductive isolating mechanism between the two species. Analysis of occupancy of territories with respect to diffuse and direct light at the site showed that territory occupancy increased with increasing diffuse light and decreasing direct light.

==== Leks ====
In a study conducted by Kimsey, an entomologist that specializes in bees and wasps at the University of California, Davis, she defined leks as fulfilling four criteria: 1) males aggregate and display at sites for mating; 2) males defend territories from conspecific (of the same species) males; 3) the territories do not have food or oviposition sites; and 4) the females can choose their mate. Kimsey and her team investigated E. meriana in the Canal Zone for two years.

Males of this species are territorial and operate a lek system. Each selects a perch on the trunk of a tree at the edge of a temporary clearing in the forest caused by a fallen tree. None of the territories contained any flowering plants, nest sites, or nest building materials. Territories are found in treefalls or large light gaps in the tropical forest. Trees used by E. meriana were about 20–30 cm in diameter and the perch site 2–5 m above the ground. The trees were noted to be relatively straight with smoothed bark.

The male stands in a characteristic pose with its head close to the bark, its front and hind legs extended and its middle legs folded underneath its body. Periodically it "buzzes", vibrating its wings while opening and closing them to display the yellow abdominal markings. At intervals it takes off and flies a few meters away from the perch before looping back to land close to its previous spot. The same perches are used by males every day, both in the morning and in the afternoon, but are unoccupied for a period in the middle of the day. In ensuing years, the same spots are used again as long as the clearing in the forest still exists. Males repeat cycles of patrolling and perching as long as the male remained in the territory and was not disturbed by other males. Male E. meriana flew about 2-3m from their perch when no males were present, but 4–6 m when other males were within 5m of their perch. Conflicts were sometimes observed, but were 60–90 seconds long. The males would fly around each other until the other male left.

It appears that male aggregations are seen at favorable mating sites and is likely not due to males attracting other males. The more suitable sites within a treefall, the larger the number of potential territories, and the more males were found in these areas. Kimsey suggests that this type of a lek is a transitional type of lek in the entire evolution of classical leks.

==== Male-male interactions ====
David W. Roubik of the Smithsonian Tropical Research Institute observed male E. meriana forming a ball around a recently killed male of their species. They were observed to be biting the dead male’s hind tibia and scraping them with their forelegs, a behavior typically seen in their chemical harvesting. Roubik notes this as a sort of chemical parasitism – it is possible that the dead male had a "good" blend of chemicals, and the males scraping them off attempted to gather the potentially favorable blend held by a former competitor. Chemicals stored by the male E. meriana do not change chemical composition over the few weeks they are stored. Other species observed on the Barro Colorado island in Panama had unique chemical combinations. Thus, it is hypothesized that if a male has good survival, and has had good foraging success with orchids, saps, resins, or fungi, it could have a better chance of mating.

==== Female-male interactions ====
Some field observations suggest that male Eulaema meriana collect these volatile fragrances to inform potential mates that they have “good genes”. Males had the same sweeter mandibular gland odors but very different, rancid hind tibial odors.

When a female approaches a male, the male likely disperses collected odors towards the female – it is at this stage that the male would disperse a chemical blend specific to the E. meriana. Males that have lived longer and foraged widely, as evidenced by the chemicals it disperses, could show the female that they are better equipped with “better genes” and better survival and foraging skills.

Females have large ranges in which they forage and these may contain a number of different male territories, some solitary and others in loose groups. A female attracted to a territory circles around with the male before landing on the perch tree, often taking off and settling several times. The female entering the territory initially appears to be similar to an intruding male. The female E. meriana flies in small circles with the male, and the mating process begins when the male successfully lands on the female's back with mating lasting around 5 minutes. After mating, the females leave immediately. Matings have only been observed when no other males were present. It is not entirely apparent how a male's collected and stored fragrances may facilitate the breeding process.

Further research about these chemical stimuli is still needed, as the exact context in which these behaviors are evoked could depend on many environmental factors.

== Mimicry ==
Large bees of the genus Eulaema are found frequently in moderately wet lowland forests of tropical America and show red, yellow, and black colors. E. meriana females sting quite painfully, so the males could be considered to be Batesian mimics to females. Several asilid flies also mimic some of the color patterns found in Eulaema. The most striking mimicry in the Amazon basin and Guiana highlands are the Eufriesea ornate and the Eufriesea limbata who have similar tergum patterns and colors to the E. meriana.

E. meriana have also been observed to have slightly different patterns depending the region it is found in. For example, in Guatemala, El Salvador, and Nicaragua, E. meriana show a “flavescens” pattern, without red or brown, and having pale yellow or almost white bands on the terga.

E. bombiformis, E. meriana, and E. seabrai form part of a Müllerian mimetic complex in the Amazon basin and are very similar and make distinguishing between them difficult. However, in eastern Brazil near the coast, these three species are easily distinguished. One can see that these three species show different mimetic patterns in different geographic areas – sometimes between two species independent of the third, and sometimes involving all three. Robert L. Dressler, an expert on orchids, hypothesizes that these bee patterns have their origin in the Pleistocene geography of America. He suggests that the original isolation that led to speciation of E. meriana and E. bombiformis could have occurred in the early Pleistocene.

In the case of E. meriana, there appears to be no obvious ecological factor that explains why the “flavescens” pattern occurs in 3 separate areas in the Neotropical region. Those in Brazil are almost identical to the ones in Nicaragua and El Salvador. Dressler suggests that E. meriana was once monomorphic with only the “flavescens” pattern, but has been replaced by the “bombiformis” patterns like its sister species E. bombiformis because it could be more superior as “warning coloration”.

== Sociality ==
Mixed colonies in Apidae have rarely been recorded. Sometimes more than one species are observed in a nest, but this is more common in the bumble bees. Some scientists believe that parasites can be viewed as agents that promote sociality among bees in order to promote guarding behavior and cooperation in collective nest construction and maintenance. Roubik suggests that some advantages of colony establishment counters the evolution of eusociality.

The mechanism of accepting other nest mates is unclear in E. meriana, but there is a capacity for joint nest maintenance and tolerance. This places limits on female sterility because there is no kin selection. Worker castes and non-reproductive females would not evolve if bees accept newcomers to the nest in order to offset costs of a small colony and risks from enemies.

=== Polymorphism and social limits ===
Eulaema show high polymorphism and high proportions of diploid males. After assays of 23 enzymes, Roubik focused on five polymorphic systems with six isozyme loci. E. Meriana had 35% heterozygotes for a HK loci, and 54% heterozygosity for the PGM loci. Diploid males were observed in rather high proportions. Diploid males were not observed to be larger than or more distinctive than haploid males, and responded to chemical baits in the same manner as haploid males. Homozygosity at the sex locus leads to 50% of the diploids being male in Hymenoptera, and diploid males are usually present at some stage of the life cycle. Euglossine polymorphism is almost twice that of bumblebees, stingless bees, and honey bees.

Some scientists propose that euglossines lack the types of colonies formed by their relatives because of both high diploid male production and genetic polymorphism. Up to 50% of the bees that are intended to be females (diploids) would be males, therefore the supply of altruistic workers would not be stable. Without a stable supply of workers, colonies would not be able to develop adequately. Because the diploid male larva lives in a thick enclosed cell, females may not eliminate them as readily. There is still much discussion on the mechanisms that prevent inbreeding in euglossines and how chemical collections by males influences mating success or paternity. Some propose that inbreeding is a likely reason for the high diploid male proportion.

== Interaction with other species ==
Because Eulaema are so large, brood cells are large and take longer to provision. Thus the cell remains open for longer, providing an opportunity for parasites and scavengers to enter the nest.

=== Parasites ===
Meloetyphlus fuscatus, a meloid beetle, was observed to emerge from one studied nest. The phoretic larva of the meloid attaches itself to the bee and is carried back to the nest and functions as a nest parasite, where it feeds on provisions collected by the bees.

Hoplomutilla conspecta, a species of parasitoid mutillid wasp, was found in a nest, chewing at closed brood cells, but oviposition was not observed.

Wasps of the family Leucospidae were found to emerge from nests. In one of the nests observed and followed by Cameron and Ramirez, a total of 51 wasps emerged. One of the cells was revealed to have at least 20 Leucospis pupal exuviae. Leucospis pinna is an ectoparasite of E. meriana, and is the first species of Leucospis that was reported to parasitize Euglossini. It is also the first known member of Leucospidae that has gregarious larvae, with multiple adults emerging from the same cell.
