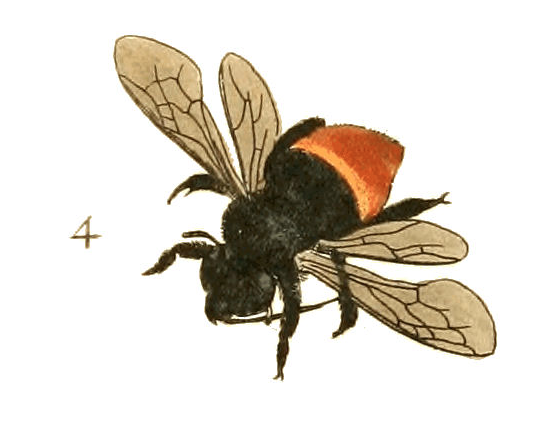

Scientific classification
- Kingdom: Animalia
- Phylum: Arthropoda
- Clade: Pancrustacea
- Class: Insecta
- Order: Hymenoptera
- Family: Apidae
- Genus: Eufriesea
- Species: E. surinamensis

Binomial name
- Eufriesea surinamensis Linnaeus, 1758
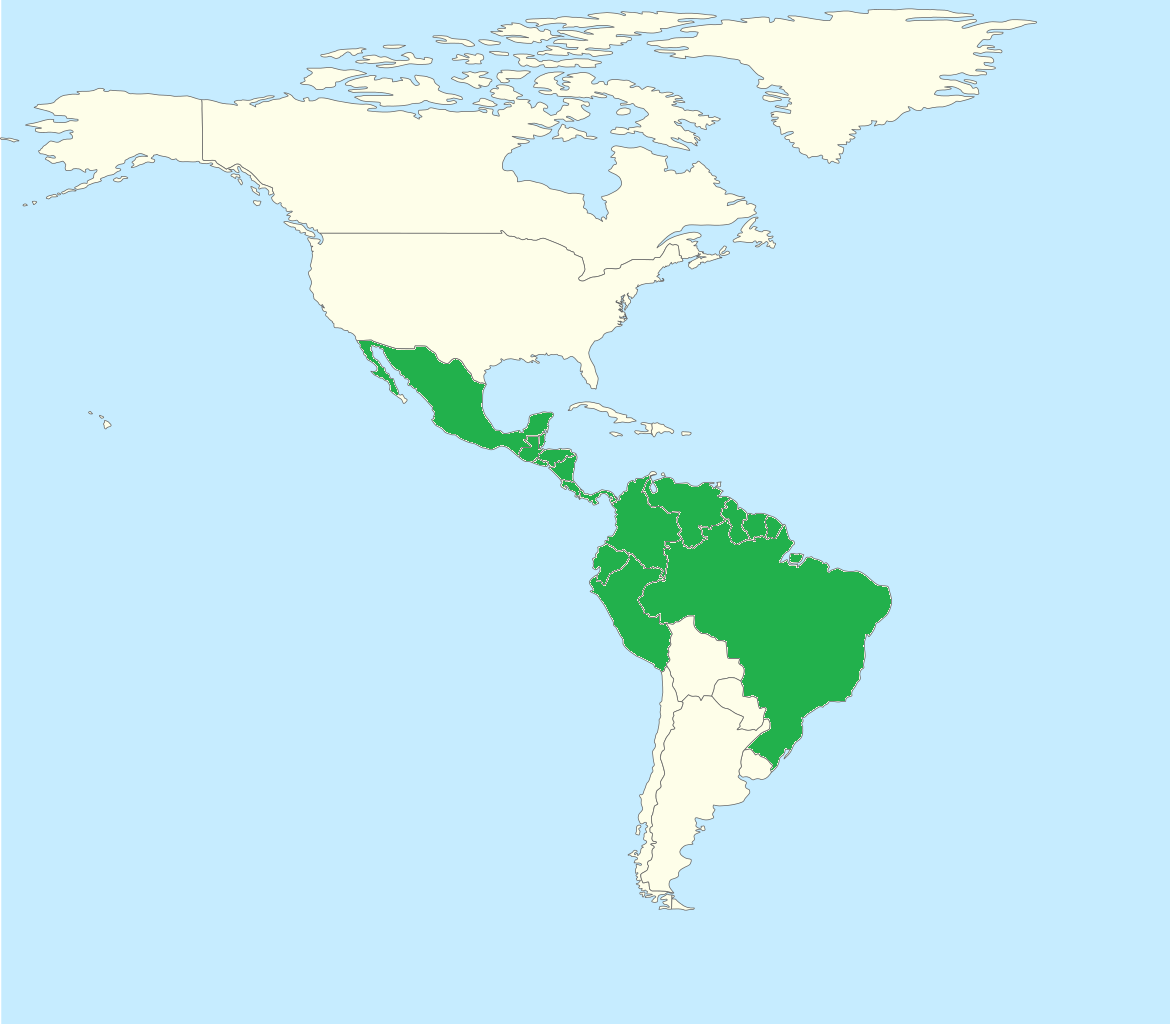

Synonyms
- Apis surinamensis Linnaeus, 1758; Apis tropica Linnaeus, 1758; Apis abdomenoflavum De Geer 1773; Centris smaragdina Perty 1833; Euglossa angulata Mocsary 1897; Eulaema bruesi Cockerell 1914; Eulaema amabilis Cockerell 1917; Euplusia tectora Kimsey 1977

= Eufriesea surinamensis =

Species of bee

Eufriesea surinamensis belongs to the tribe of euglossine bees and as such is a species of orchid bee. This should not be mistaken with the species group surinamensis, which includes Ef. surinamensis among other Eufriesea species.

== Taxonomy and phylogeny ==
Eufriesea surinamensis was first described by Swedish zoologist Carl Linnaeus in 1758. The genera Eufriesia and Euplusia were combined in 1979 by Kimsey. The genus Eufriesea, consisting of 52 species, was later reviewed by Kimsey in 1982.

Euglossine bees are a relatively new group of bee, sharing a common ancestor with the Bombini, one of the four tribes of corbiculate bee that have a pollen basket. The genus Eufriesia is the second largest within the Euglossini tribe. It is challenging to distinguish between the over fifty Eufriesea species, particularly since the females mimic each other. Within the surinamensis group it is very difficult to distinguish between females of different species.

== Description and identification ==
Eufriesea surinamensis are characterized by their long tongue and yellow hindtibial posterior fringe. The forehead and thorax are black with a colorful, metallic face; the labrum is also rounded. One can distinguish between the two sexes by looking at the ridges on the clypeus. Males have three, while females only have one. Also, a female's clypeus is not depressed at the tentorial pits. Males are approximately 16–19 mm in length, with a tongue of about 13–14 mm long. Ef. surinamensis can be distinguished from other euglossine species by the knob above their hindtibial spurs and by the darkened medial cell in their wings.

Their tongues can be anywhere from 68% to greater than 80% of their body length. Each female cares for her own nest, though she may build nests in close proximity to other females due to limited availability of good locations.

== Distribution and habitat ==
Female bees construct aggregated nests of varying sizes out of mud, bark, and resin. Nests are typically located in sheltered locations such as small crevices found in cliffsides and cracks in trees. They have also adapted to humans by creating their nests below buildings, within walls and under bridges.

Though females nest in aggregations, this is due more to lack of suitable locations than any social interactions. They work independent of each other, though they nest adjacent to each other. Nests are typically a linear series of cells with an outer layer made using bark and a smooth inner layer of wax.

These bees are commonly found in the neotropical regions throughout Mexico, Central America and South America.

=== Seasonality ===
Eufriesea surinamensis is considered to be a characteristically seasonal bee. This activity of this bee species is restricted during the late spring and summer months, as was observed in the Atlantic Forest region. Specifically, the unique climate of each area largely determines the composition of the bee community, since environmental variations affect pollen and nectar source locations as well as nesting places. They begin foraging early in the dry season, about four months from winter to early spring, and continue during the wet season, about seven months from spring to fall.

== Nesting cycle ==
As each female cares for her own nest, there are no colonies. However, these bees do nest in aggregation of up to thirty nests in one location, with each nest holding up to eight eggs. Females have been seen nesting in more than one location.

Females make two types of foraging trips: to collect pollen or nesting materials. They typically forage for pollen in the morning, to provision their nests. They will also search for building materials for a nest, including bark and resin, which they attach to their corbicula when flying back to the nest. These bees have been observed to return to their nests from distances as far as 23 km.

Being a seasonal bee, females only create nests during the dry season, about four months from winter to early spring, with larvae developing during the wet season, about seven months from spring to fall. Developing young grow quickly and spend most of the wet season in larval diapause, a delay in development so that the juveniles can emerge into the optimal environment to begin creating their own nests and repeating the cycle. Eggs are typically 6 mm long by 1 mm wide and during development larvae will grow from 0.5 cm up to 2.5 cm.

As these bees are relatively short-lived, there is no generation overlap. However, old, abandoned and empty nests will be repaired and reused by new female bees. This is advantageous as they will only need to provision pollen to nurture larval development. It also has the added benefit of decreasing the time required for nest completion and allowing females to put more resources into laying more eggs.

== Behavior ==
=== Dominance hierarchy ===
Though female bees build nests in aggregations, each is in charge of building and provisioning her own nests. There is no queen bee overseeing the work or workers to help her.

=== Mating behavior ===
Male hind legs are specialized to store aromatic compounds. There can be up to seventy compounds in each tibia. Some researchers believe that these compounds are used to form male leks, while others believe that the compounds may be changed into sex hormones. Still others believe that these aromatic compounds may be a courtship gift or an anti-predator ward. In 2005, Thomas Eltz and his research group discovered that male Eufriesea will release different aromatic compounds using complex leg maneuvers, giving credence to the hypothesis that these compounds play a role in mating, though they may have multiple uses.

A study found that Ef. surinamensis males have a marked preference for the compound vanillin, compared to 1.8 cineole and eugenol.

=== Nest visits among females ===
Nesting female bees will often visit other bee's nests. Myers and Loveless classified five different entry types:

1. Transient entry
2. Longer entry – the bee stays up to half an hour
3. Nest robbing – a visiting bee will steal provisions
4. Nest defense – the rightful occupant will remove an invader
5. Belligerence – the invading female will attempt to remove the owner

Most females visit a nest after completing a nest and beginning work on a new one. Nest defense and invasion can become very violent with both bees falling to the ground. Females will lock mandibles when fighting. Though no bees were observed to be injured after a fight took place, fighting may deplete them of physical resources they could use elsewhere.

=== Traplining ===
Given their large ranges, it is thought that bees of the euglossine tribe trapline for more efficient foraging. Traplining occurs when an insect will visit a series of flowers in a stable, repeatable sequence. Traplining gives the bee an advantage in that they have a series of flowers they can visit to gain nectar. There is also a benefit to the flora, which can be many kilometers from each other, but can still be cross-pollinated because they are on the same traplining path. Ef. surinamensis and other orchid bees are major players in flora gene flow, and are vital to the continued health of tropical forests.

== Kin selection ==
As generations do not overlap, there is no active kin selection. However, it is quite likely that female bees will stay in the same area they were born in, reusing the same aggregation of nests they were born in to bear their offspring.

Also, as only one generation exists at a time, there are no worker bees with a vested interest in more sisters so the sex ratio is about 1:1. A study by Janzen found that in 297 bees, 59% were female. As there is little to no sociality in this species, the sex ratio is not very skewed towards females

== Mimicry and camouflage ==
Female Eufriesea have fierce stings, so predators will want to avoid them. Among the genus Eufriesea, females have evolved Müllerian mimetic complexes, making it difficult to distinguish between the species in the surinamensis group. Male Ef. surinamensis are stingless, but are Batesian automimics as their yellow hindtibial fringes trick other animals into believing they are stinging females and not stingless males. There are also flies that mimic Eufriesea, including asilids. Mimicking Eufriesea may provide these flies protection from their predators.

In the surinamensis group, Ef. surinamensis and Ef. mexicana look very similar and it can be difficult to distinguish between the two. Ef. mexicana males have an elongate apical point of the subgenital plate that Ef. surinamensis males do not have. Also, the apical dorsal segment may be blue for Ef. mexicana, particularly for females. Ef. surinamensis females are never blue. However, some Ef. mexicana females are not blue, leaving the medial cell as the only way to distinguish between the two species. If darkened, the bee is of Ef. surinamensis, otherwise it is Ef. mexicana.

Nests do not need to be camouflaged as they tend to be hidden away under buildings, or in small crevices.

== Interactions with other species ==
=== Diet ===
Adult bees visit various flora for nectar and pollen. Adults drink nectar, and females collect pollen for larvae to feed on during development. Males also visit flora for aromatic compounds, but it is uncertain what these are used for. Listed below are some of the flora that Eufriesea surinamensis forage from.

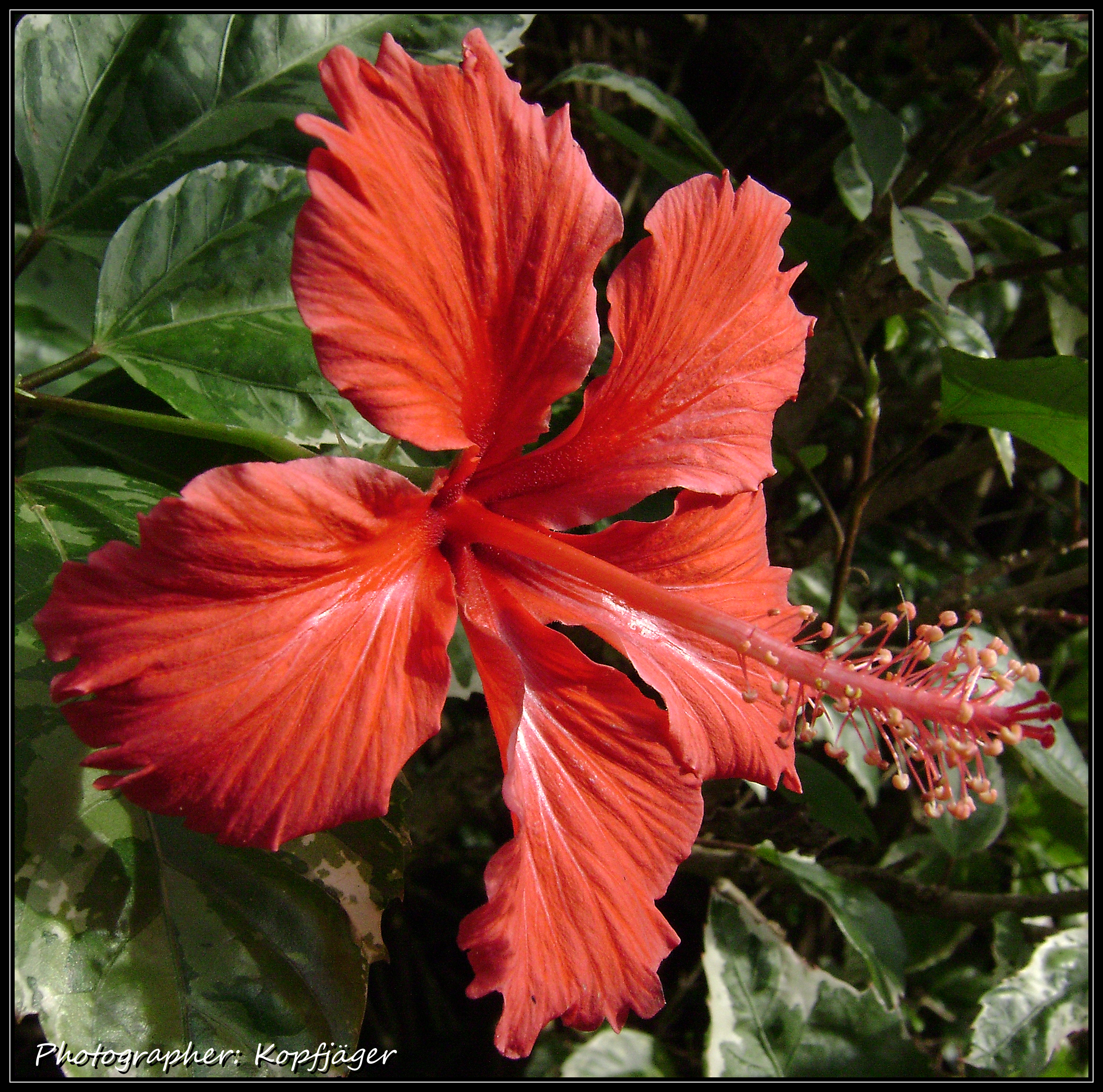
Hibiscus rosa-sinensis, a flower that Ef. surinamensis gathers nectar from

Species of flora visited for nectar:

- Hibiscus rosa-sinensis
- H. schizopetalus
- Sobralia violacea
- Thunbergia species
- Costus guanaiensis v. macrostrobilus
- C. villosissmus
- C. friedrichsthenii
- Cassia multijuga
- Ischnosiphon species
- I. ovatus
- Mandevilla species
- Thevetia peruviana
- Dimerocostus strobilaceus
- Sinningia villosa

Species of flora visited for pollen:

- Solanum species
- Cassia species

Species of flora visited for aromatic materials:

- Notylia xyphorus
- N. wullschlaegeliana
- Cypholoron species

=== Parasites ===
Exaerete dentata and Exaerete smaragdina, which both belong to the tribe Euglossini, are two kleptoparasitic bees that will lay their eggs in Ef. surinamensis nests. A female Ex. dentata will open a sealed cell carefully, removing bits of bark from the cell cap. Though some bark will fall away, most of it will stay attached to the female for later use. Once she can reach inside, she will use her mandibles to crush the Ef. surinamensis egg and replace it with her own egg. Then she will reseal the cell using the original bark.

Not only are nests of Ef. surinamensis parasitized by other species, but they also take advantage of empty nests to lay their eggs. Ef. surinamensis has been found in abandoned nests of Centris trigonoides and Monobia nigripennis built within the shells of termite nests.

== Predators ==
There are no known predators or parasites that attack Eufriesea adults.

=== Diseases ===
It has been difficult for researchers to raise Ef. surinamensis larvae as they are soon attacked by molds once the cell wall has been opened. It is believed that resin use is an adaptation on the female's part to help her offspring grow to adulthood.

== Interactions with humans ==
Ef. surinamensis is responsible for pollinating a wide variety of orchids and other flora in neotropical regions. Thanks to their long flight ranges, these bees are crucial for the continued reproduction of scattered and uncommon flora throughout tropical forests. Thus deforestation and fragmentation of their habitats not only jeopardizes these bees, but also the entire surrounding ecosystem.

Though females can build nests under houses and around humans, there has been no evidence of Ef. surinamensis acting as a pest or causing health problems with its sting.
