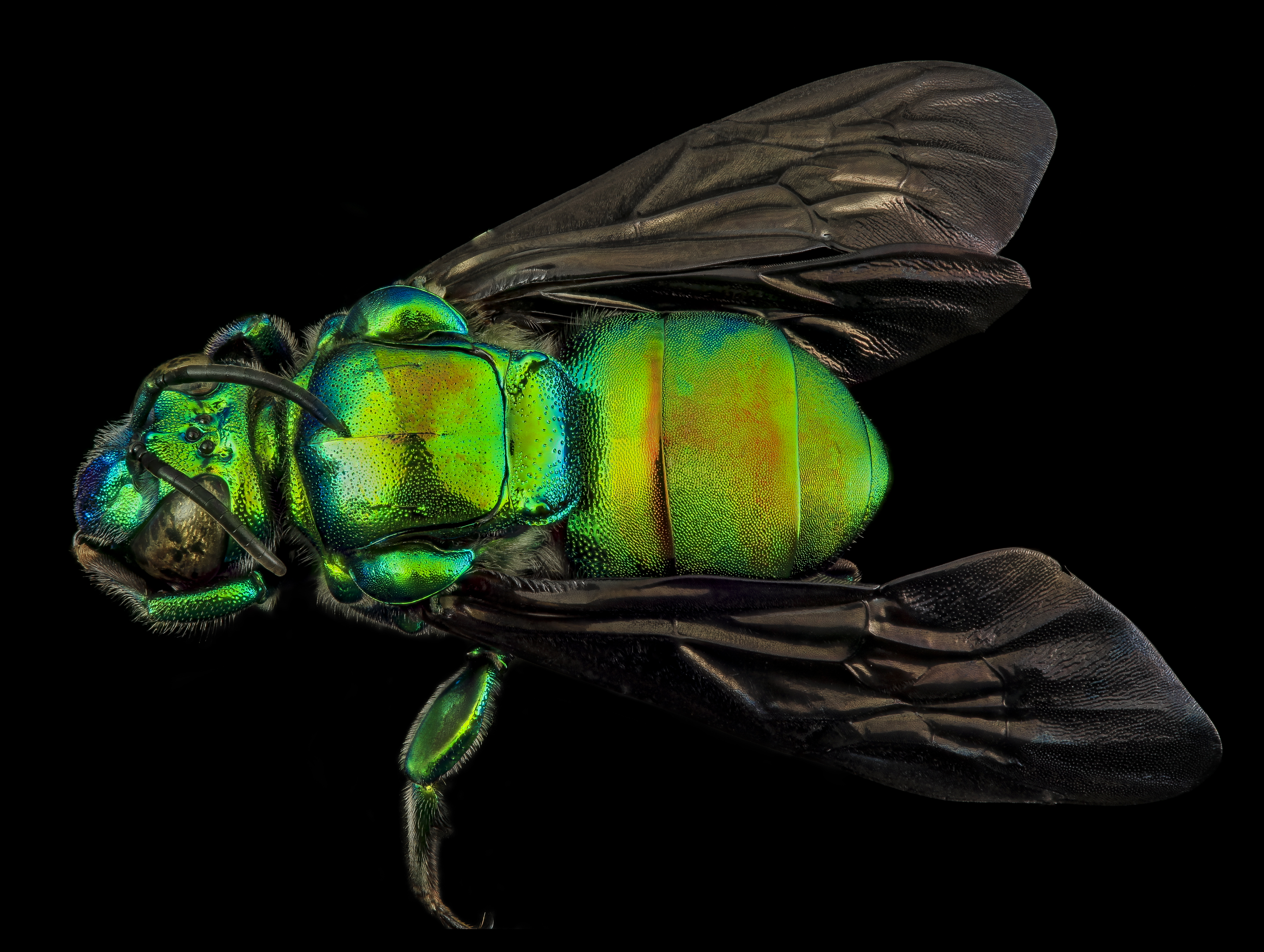
- Exaerete frontalis from Guyana.

Scientific classification
- Kingdom: Animalia
- Phylum: Arthropoda
- Clade: Pancrustacea
- Class: Insecta
- Order: Hymenoptera
- Family: Apidae
- Genus: Exaerete
- Species: E. frontalis

Binomial name
- Exaerete frontalis (Guérin-Méneville, 1845)

= Exaerete frontalis =

Species of bee

Exaerete frontalis is a kleptoparasitic species of euglossine bees.

== Behavior ==
Exaerete frontalis is a kleptoparasitic species. Females do not build own nests but lay their egg in nests of other large euglossine bees, especially in the genera Eulaema and Eufriesea.

== Distribution ==
Exaerete frontalis is found from Central America to central South America.
