= Exaerete azteca =

Scientific classification
- Domain: Eukaryota
- Kingdom: Animalia
- Phylum: Arthropoda
- Class: Insecta
- Order: Hymenoptera
- Family: Apidae
- Genus: Exaerete
- Species: E. azteca

Binomial name
- Exaerete azteca Moure, 1964

Species of bee

Exaerete azteca is a kleptoparasitic species of euglossine bees.

== Description ==
Exaerete azteca is primarily a bright blue to purple in color.

== Distribution ==
This species is endemic to Mexico.
