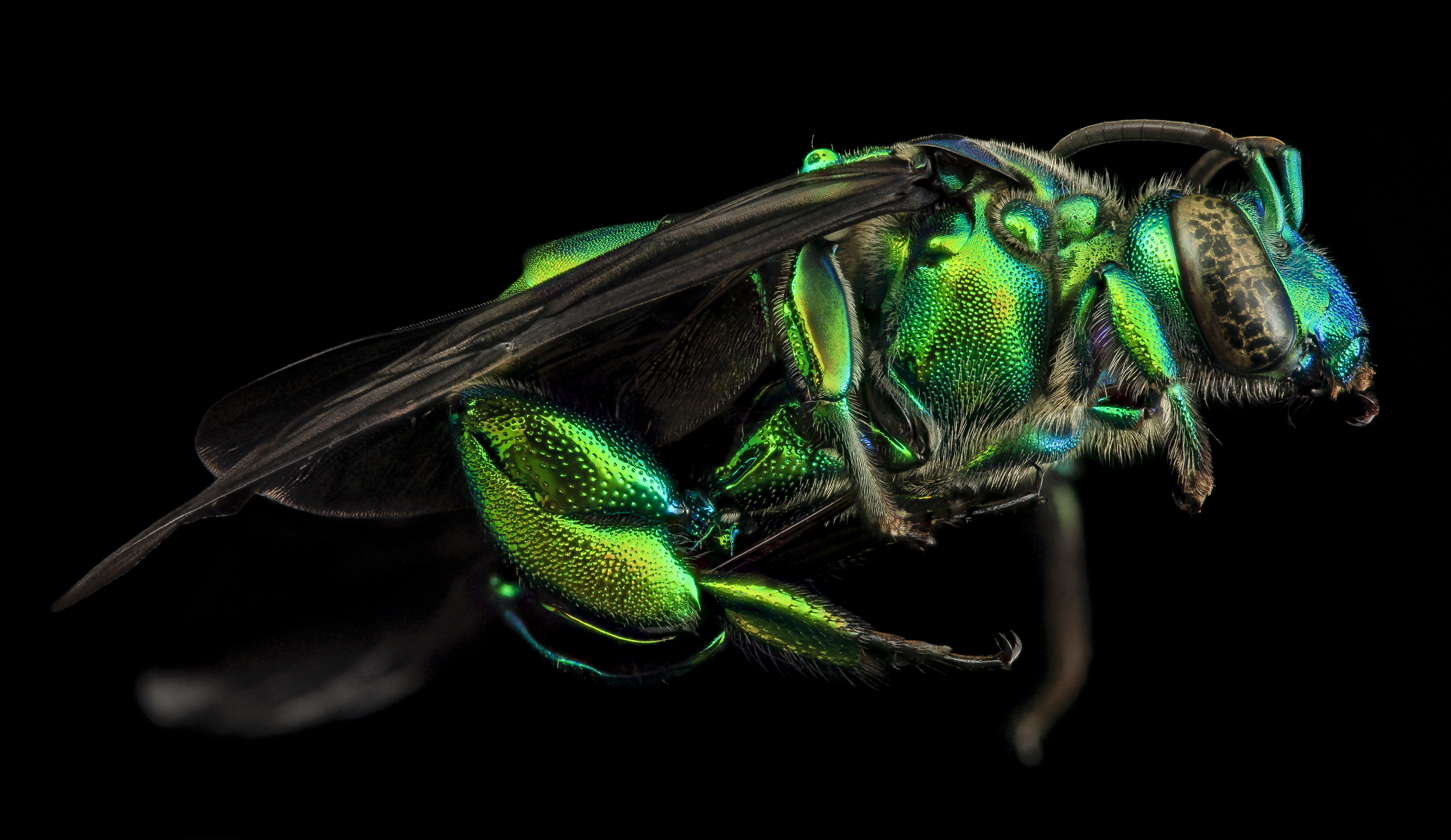
- Exaerete frontalis

Scientific classification
- Domain: Eukaryota
- Kingdom: Animalia
- Phylum: Arthropoda
- Class: Insecta
- Order: Hymenoptera
- Family: Apidae
- Tribe: Euglossini
- Genus: Exaerete; Hoffmannsegg, 1817

= Exaerete =

Genus of bees

Exaerete is a genus of euglossine bees found from Mexico to northern Argentina. Like all orchid bees, they are restricted to the Neotropics. All but one species is metallic green, and they are cleptoparasites in the nests of other euglossines in the genera Eufriesea and Eulaema. It contains the following species:

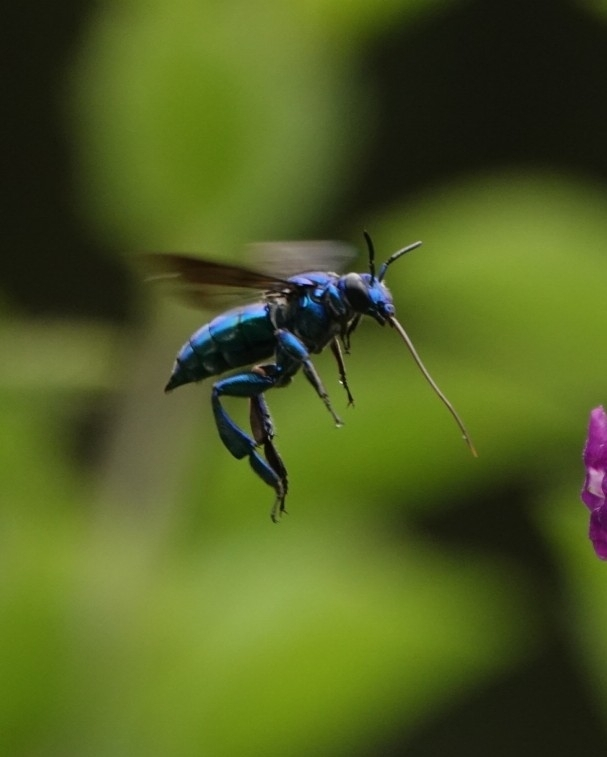
E. smaragdina, Peru

- Exaerete azteca Moure, 1964
- Exaerete dentata (Linnaeus, 1758)
- Exaerete fallaciosa Engel, 2018
- Exaerete frontalis (Guérin-Méneville, 1845)
- Exaerete kimseyae Oliviera, 2011
- Exaerete lepeletieri Oliviera & Nemesio, 2003
- Exaerete salsai Nemesio, 2011
- Exaerete smaragdina (Guérin-Méneville, 1845)
- Exaerete tricosa Engel & Bembé, 2020
- Exaerete trochanterica (Friese, 1900)
