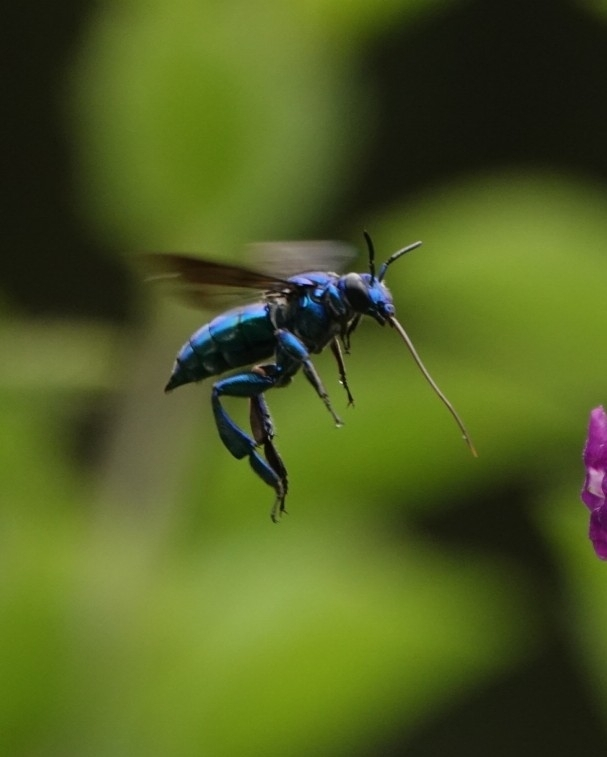
- Exaerete smaragdina from Peru.

Scientific classification
- Kingdom: Animalia
- Phylum: Arthropoda
- Clade: Pancrustacea
- Class: Insecta
- Order: Hymenoptera
- Family: Apidae
- Genus: Exaerete
- Species: E. smaragdina

Binomial name
- Exaerete smaragdina (Guérin-Méneville, 1845)

= Exaerete smaragdina =

Species of bee

Exaerete smaragdina is a species of kleptoparasitic euglossine bees.

== Description ==
Exaerete smaragdina can reach a length of about 20 millimetres (0.79 in). Body color is metallic green. The metatibiae are three times longer than wide in both sexes. Like other "cuckoo bees", females lack a pollen-carrying apparatus.

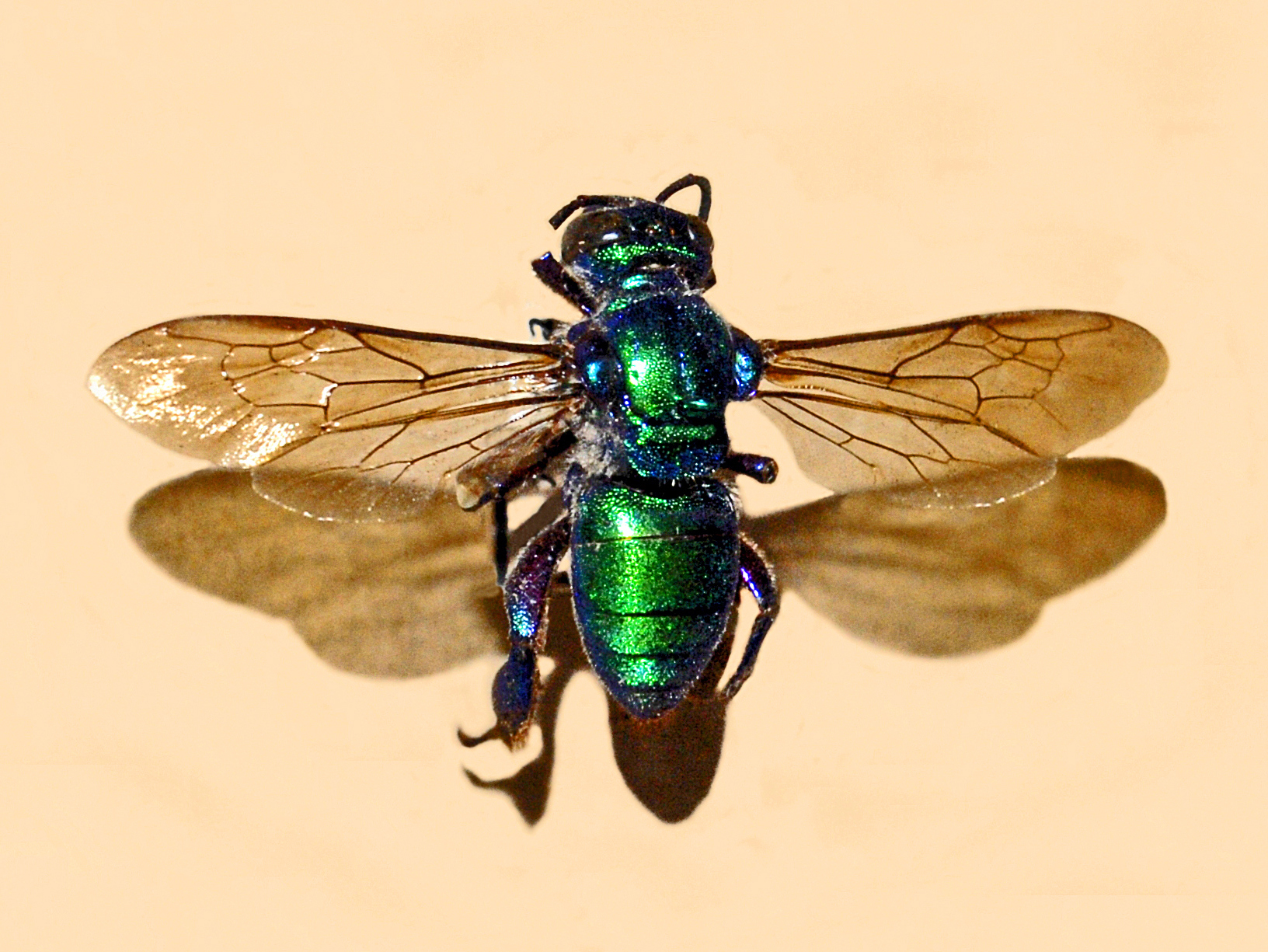
Panama. Museum specimen.

== Behavior ==
These solitary bees do not build nests, as they are kleptoparasites of Eulaema nigrita and Eufriesea surinamensis. Usually they wait for the host bees to leave the nest, then they lay their eggs in a completed cell. They go through five larval stages. In the second larval stage they kill the host egg. Adult males collect aromatic substances from flowers, mainly orchids. These substances are possibly used in reproduction to attract females.

== Distribution ==
This species is present in Central and Southern America, from Mexico to Argentina.
