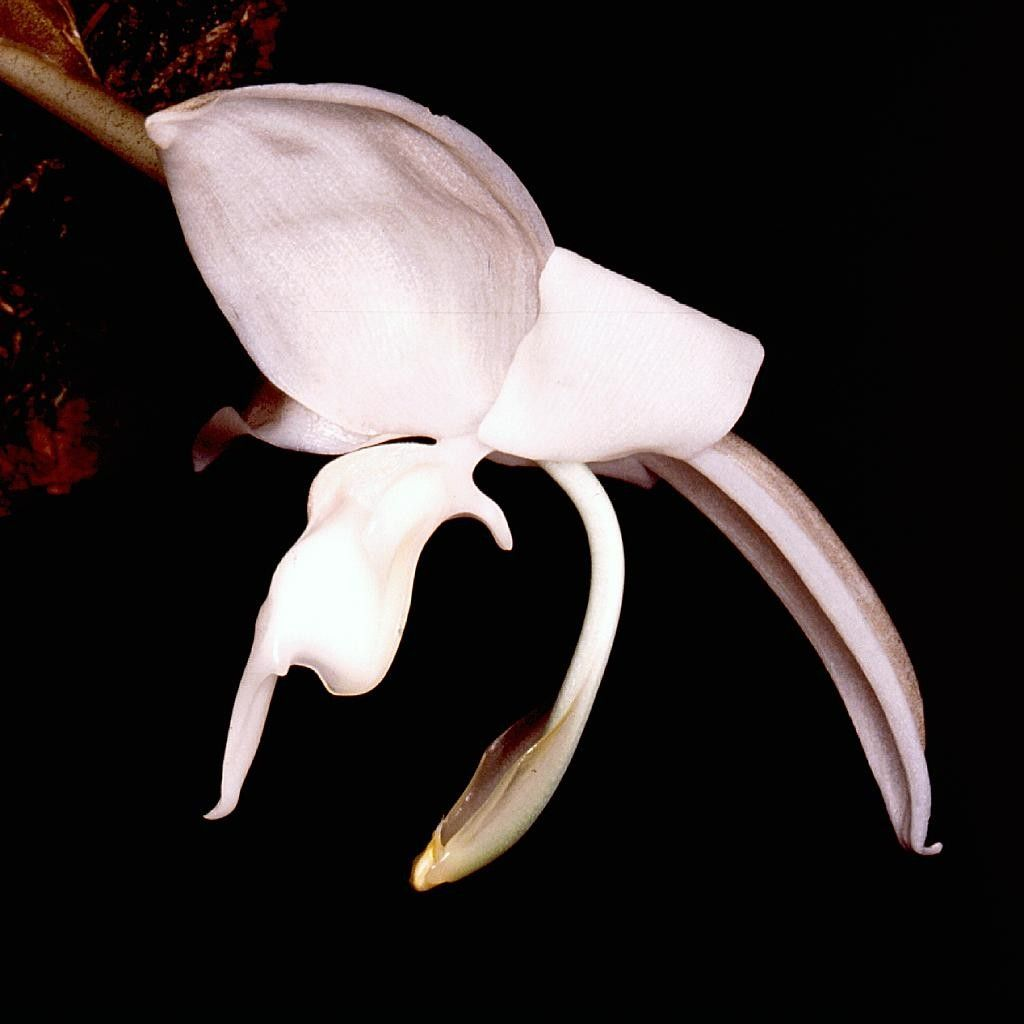
- Stanhopea candida flower

Scientific classification
- Kingdom: Plantae
- Clade: Tracheophytes
- Clade: Angiosperms
- Clade: Monocots
- Order: Asparagales
- Family: Orchidaceae
- Subfamily: Epidendroideae
- Genus: Stanhopea
- Species: S. candida

Binomial name
- Stanhopea candida Barb.Rodr.

Synonyms
- Stanhopea randii Rolfe

= Stanhopea candida =

Species of orchid

Stanhopea candida is a species of orchid endemic to southern tropical America (Bolivia, Brazil, Colombia, Ecuador, Peru and Venezuela).
