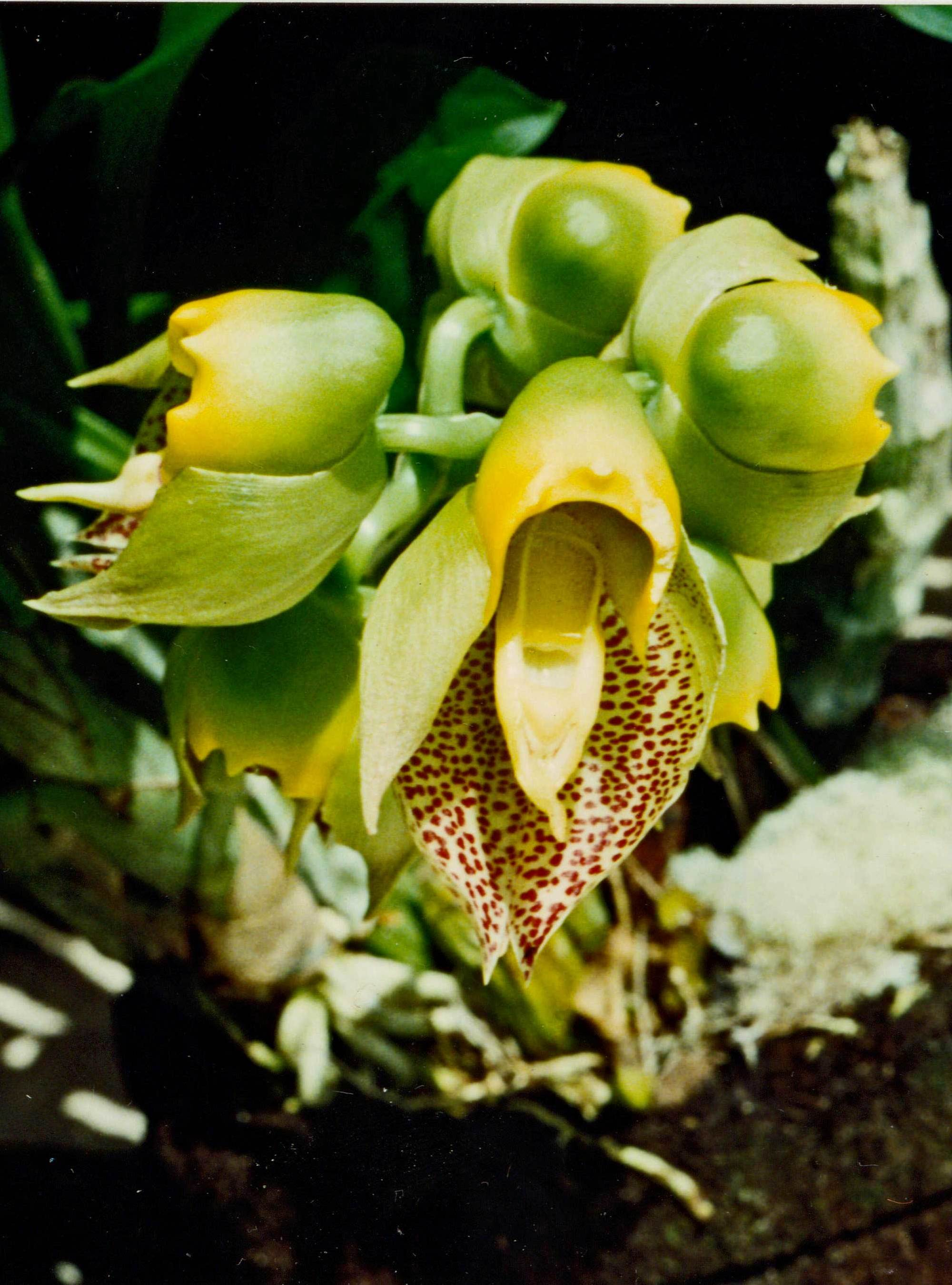
- Male flower
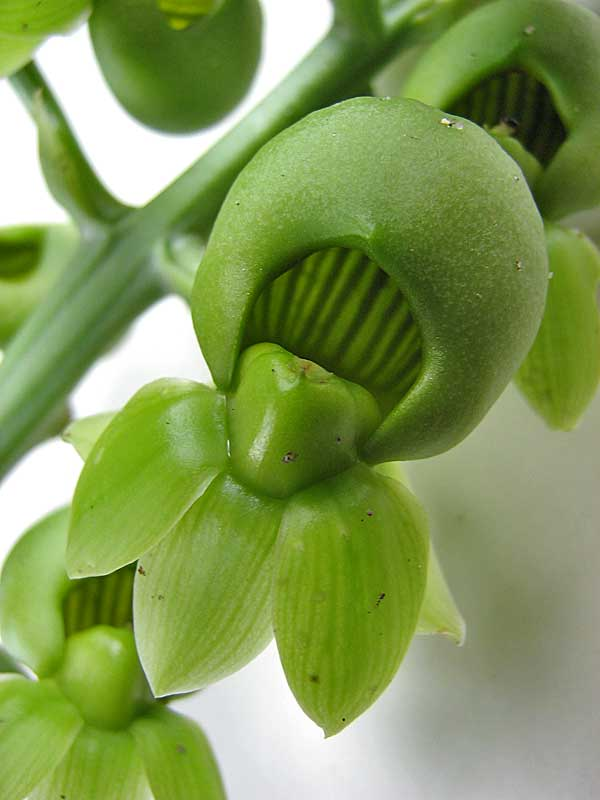
- Female flower

Scientific classification
- Kingdom: Plantae
- Clade: Tracheophytes
- Clade: Angiosperms
- Clade: Monocots
- Order: Asparagales
- Family: Orchidaceae
- Subfamily: Epidendroideae
- Genus: Catasetum
- Species: C. macrocarpum

Binomial name
- Catasetum macrocarpum Rich. ex Kunth (1822)

Synonyms
- Catasetum tridentatum Hook. (1824); Catasetum floribundum Hook. (1825); Catasetum claveringii Lindl. ex Van Geel (1829); Cypripedium cothurnum Vell. (1831); Catasetum tridentatum var. viridiflorum Hook. (1834); Monachanthus viridis Lindl. (1835); Catasetum macrocarpum var. bellum Rchb.f. (1886); Catasetum costatum Rchb.f. (1887); Catasetum macrocarpum var. chrysanthum L. Linden & Rodigas (1889); Paphiopedilum cothurnum (Vell.) Pfitzer (1894); Catasetum macrocarpum var. carnosissimum Cogn. (1895)

= Catasetum macrocarpum =

Species of orchid

Catasetum macrocarpum, the large-fruited catasetum, is a species of orchid. It is also known as the monkey goblet and monk's head orchid. It is native to the Caribbean and South America, where its distribution extends from Trinidad and Tobago to Argentina.

== Gallery ==
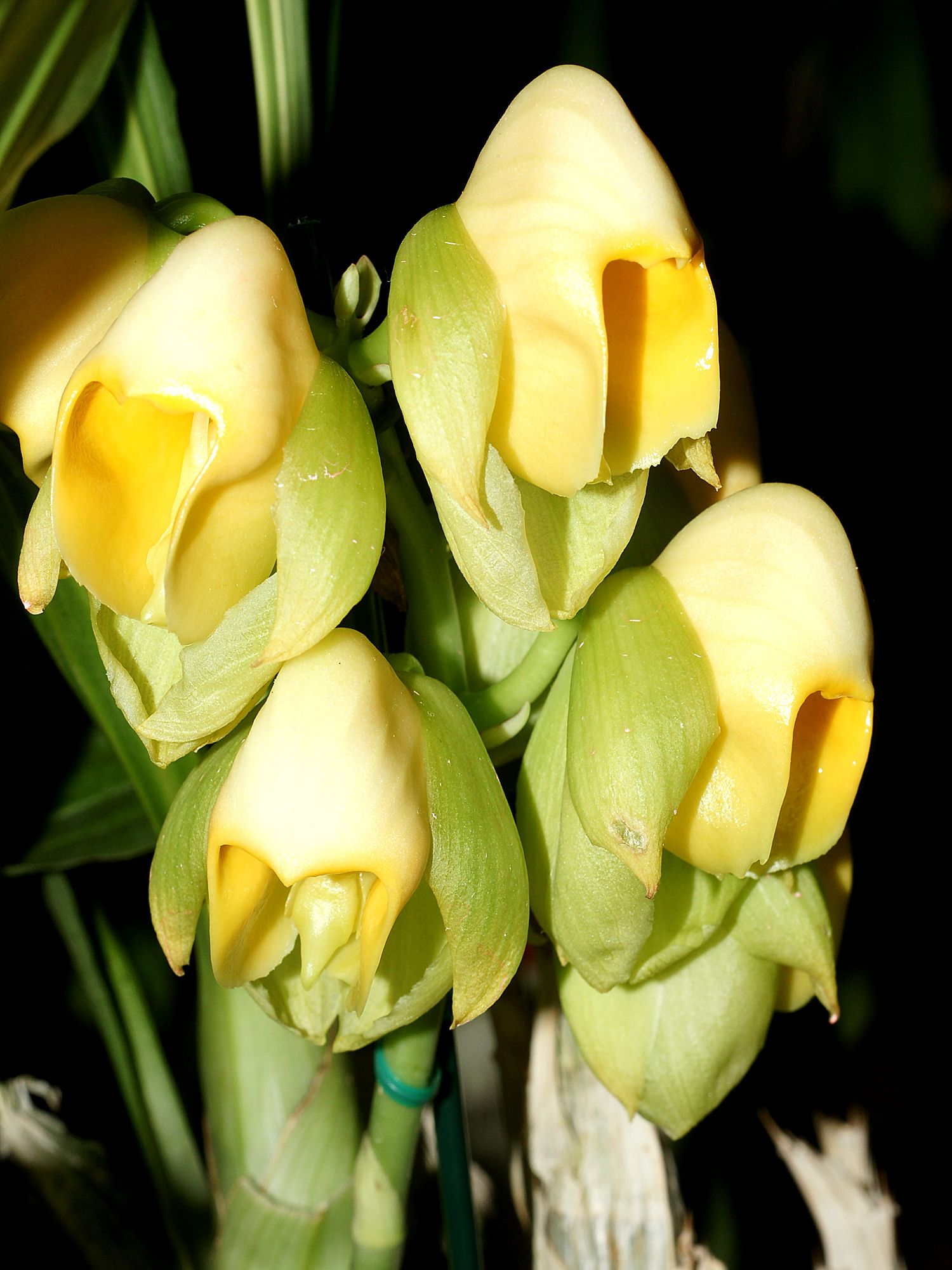
Male flower

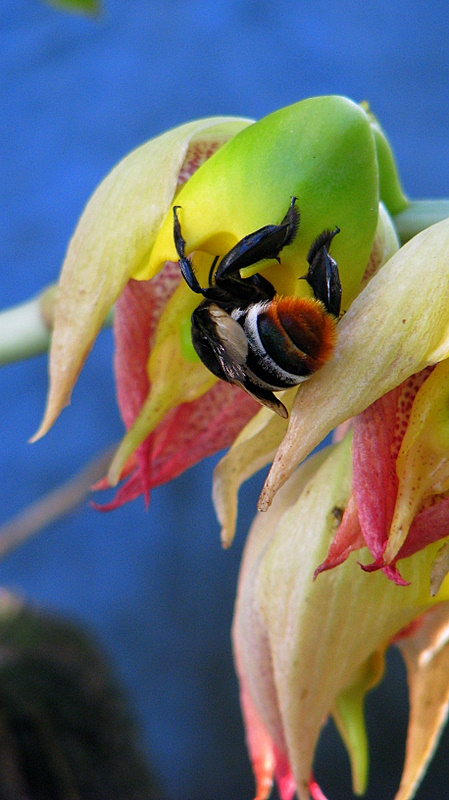
Male Eulaema niveofasciata pollinating male flower

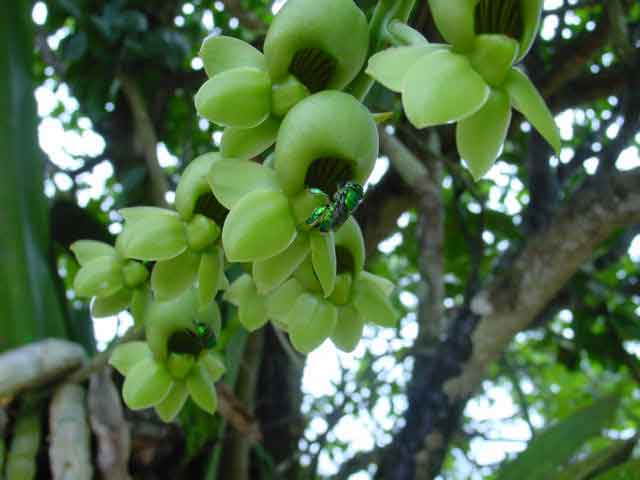
Orchid bee pollinating female flower

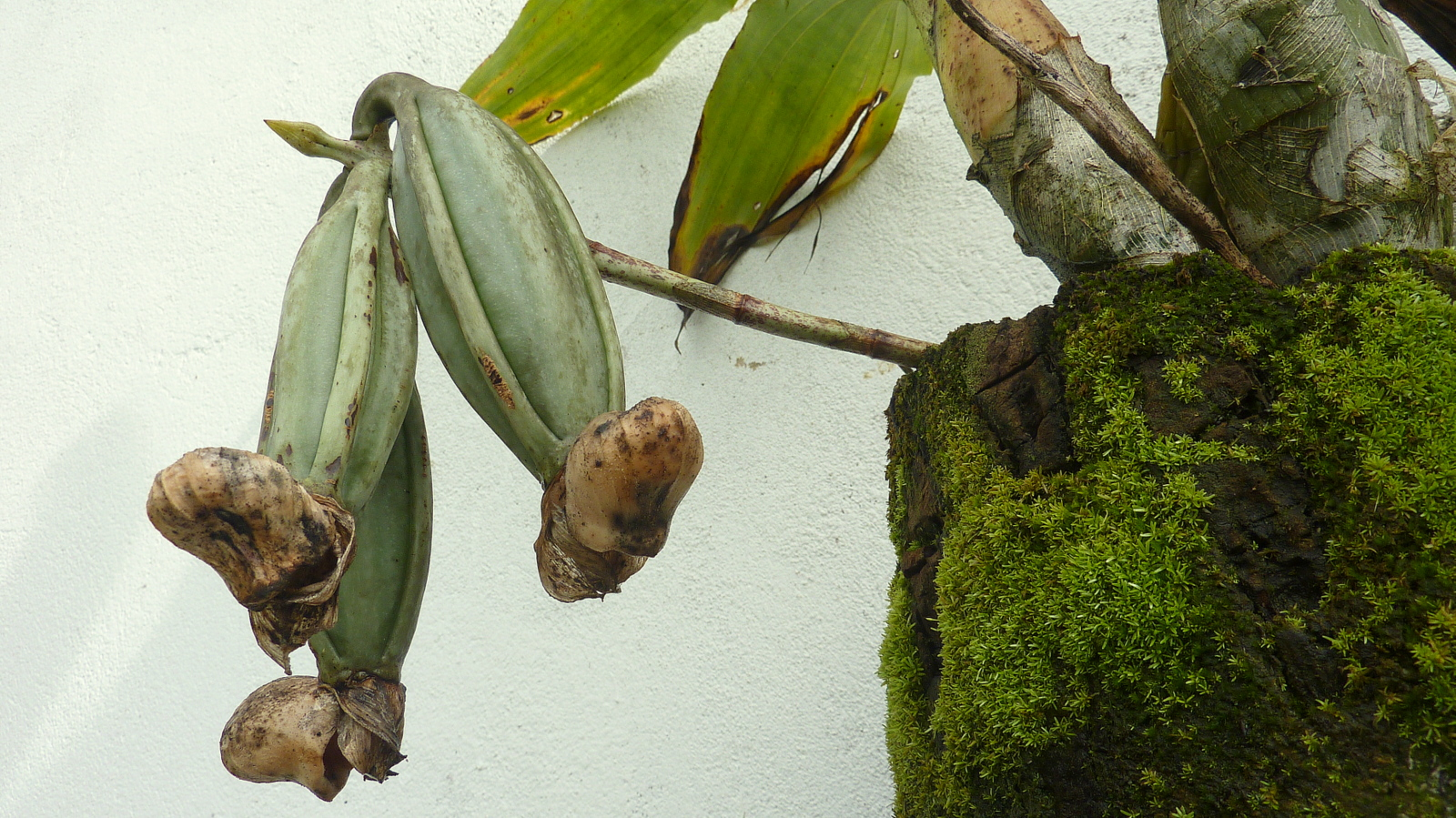
Seed pods

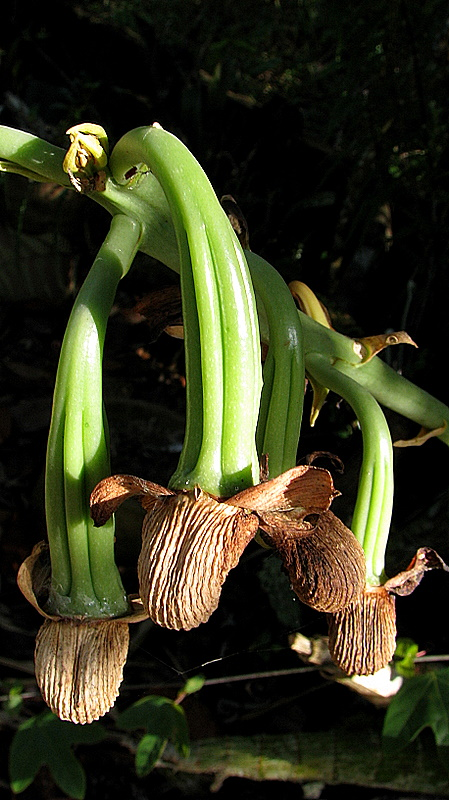
Seed pods

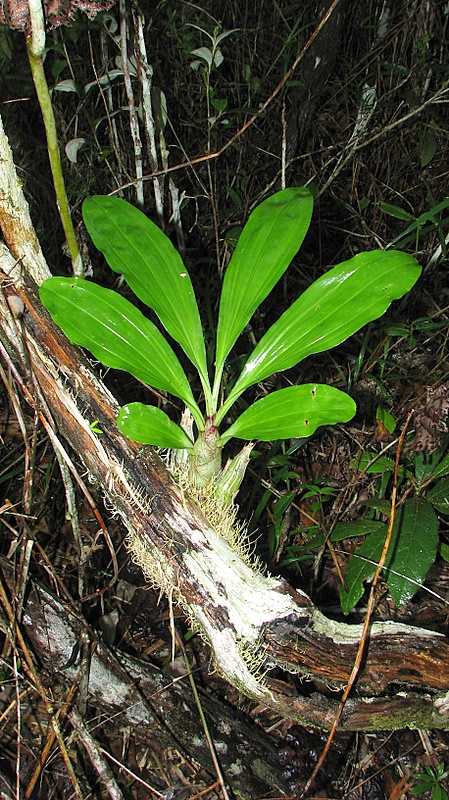
Pseudobulb

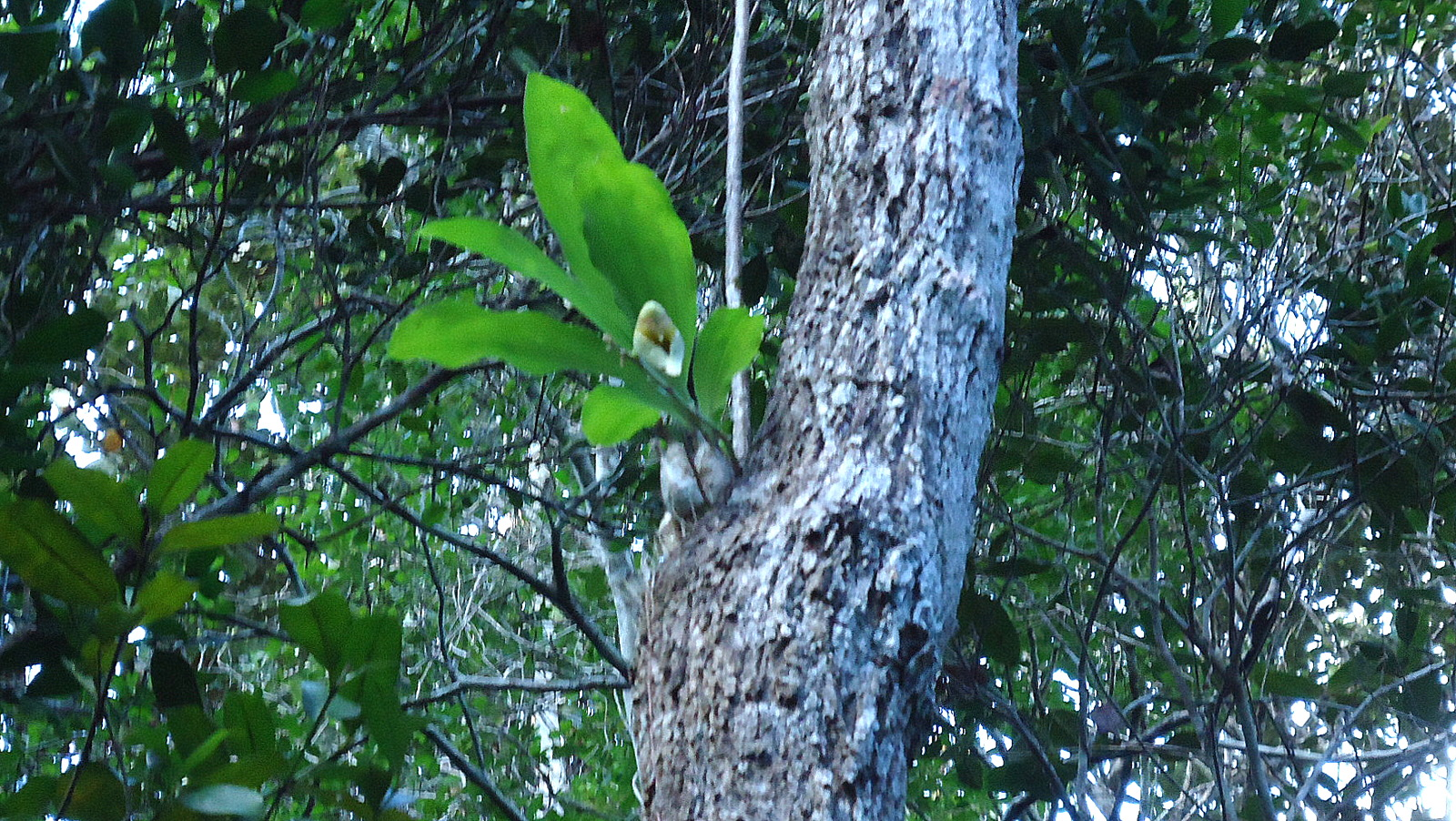
Pseudobulb on tree

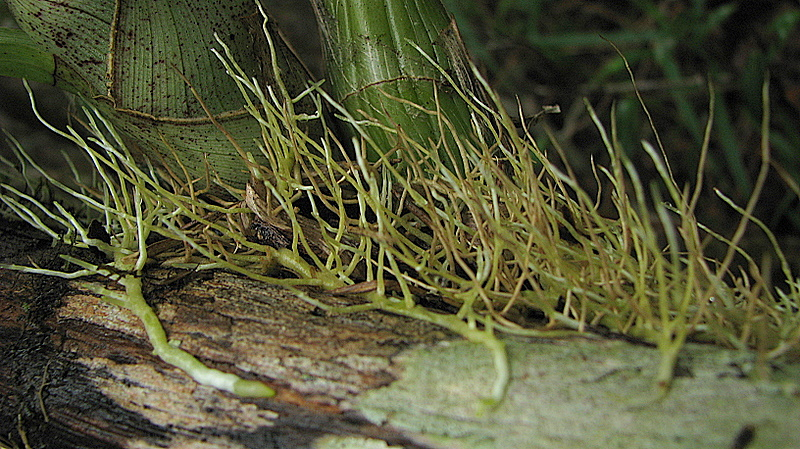
Aerial roots
