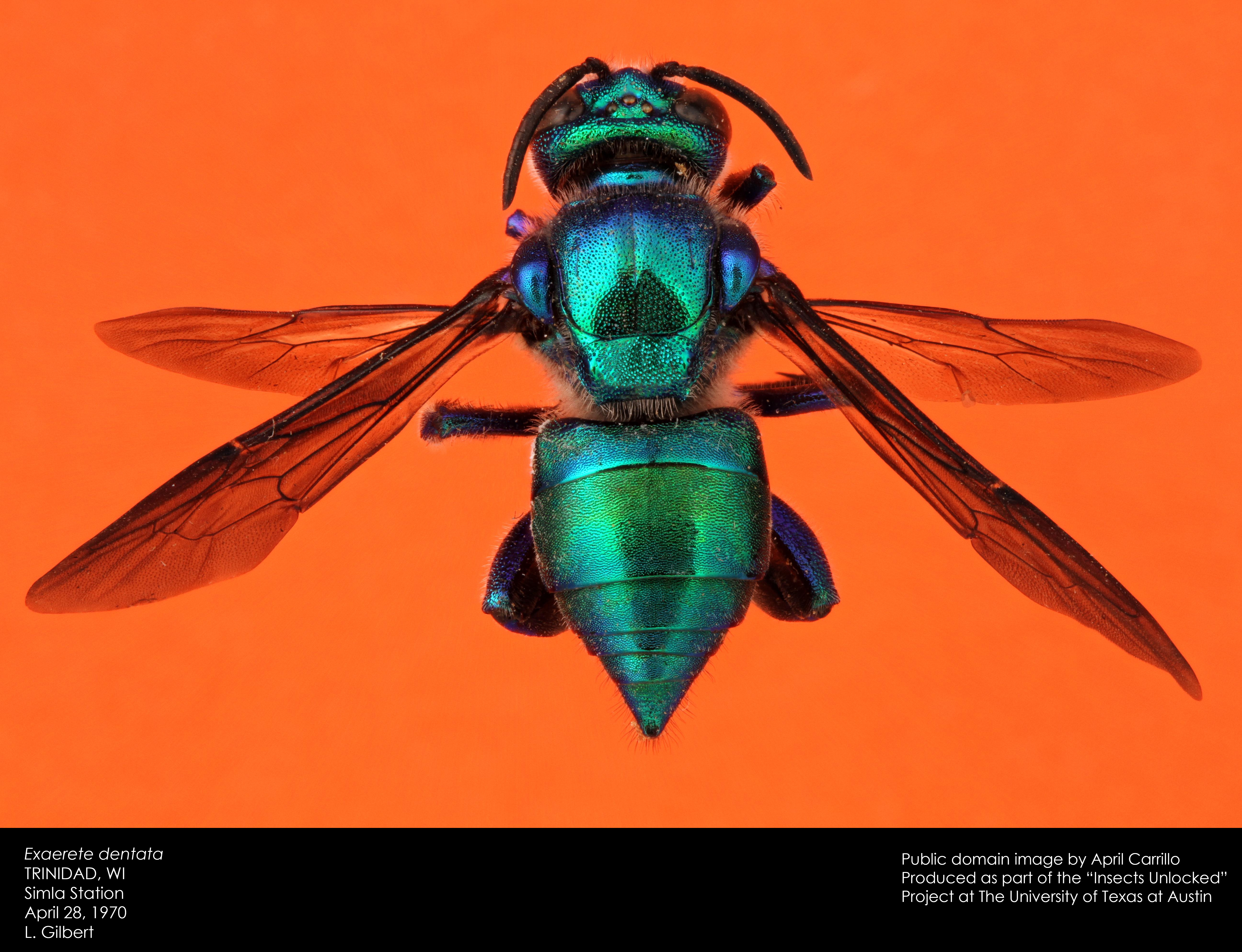

Scientific classification
- Domain: Eukaryota
- Kingdom: Animalia
- Phylum: Arthropoda
- Class: Insecta
- Order: Hymenoptera
- Family: Apidae
- Genus: Exaerete
- Species: E. dentata

Binomial name
- Exaerete dentata (Linnaeus, 1758)

Synonyms
- Apis dentata Linnaeus, 1758

= Exaerete dentata =

Species of bee

Exaerete dentata is a kleptoparasitic species of euglossine bees.
