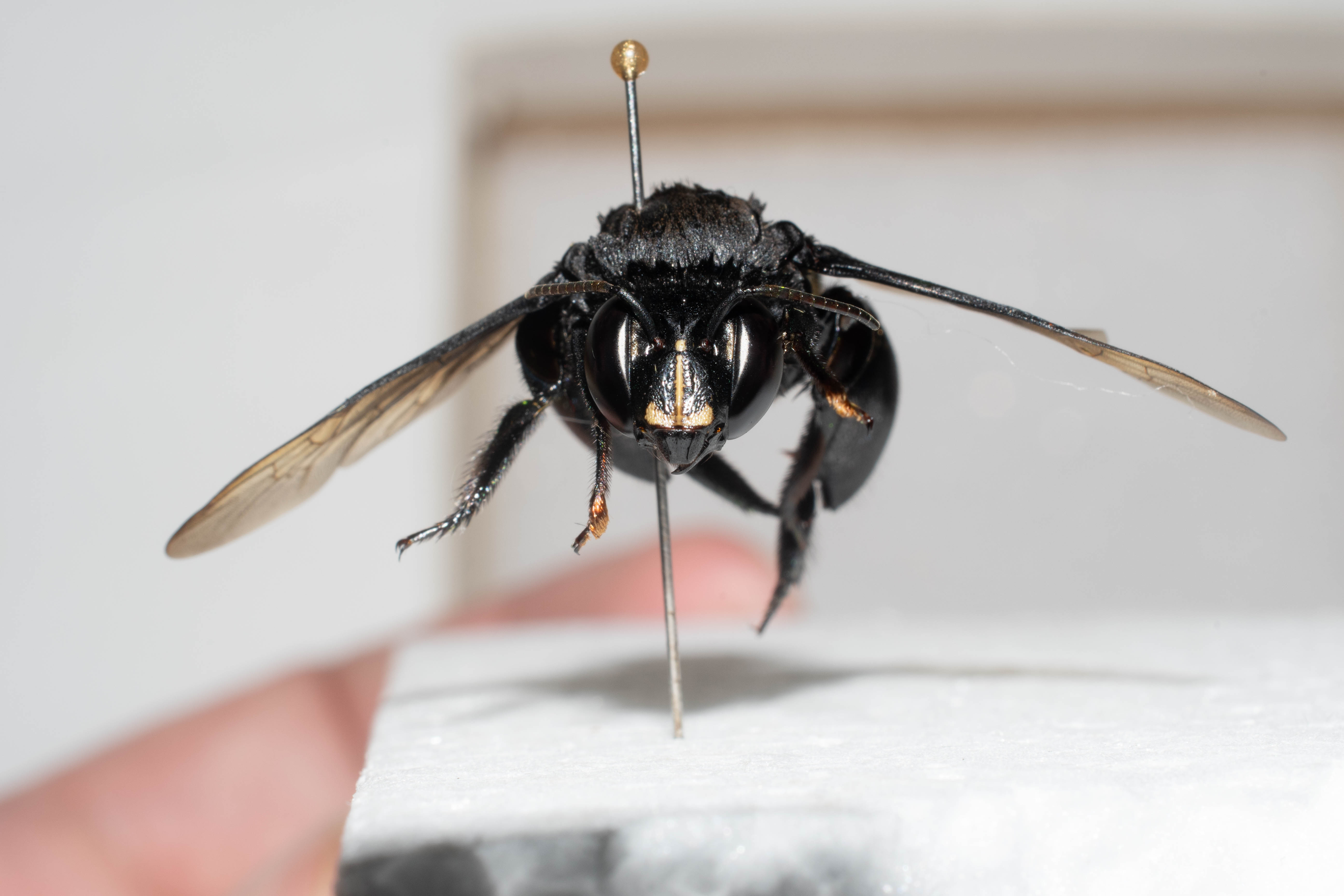
- A pinned specimen facing the camera demonstrating the white markings on the face

Scientific classification
- Kingdom: Animalia
- Phylum: Arthropoda
- Class: Insecta
- Order: Hymenoptera
- Family: Apidae
- Genus: Eulaema
- Species: E. cingulata

Binomial name
- Eulaema cingulata Fabricius (1804)

= Eulaema cingulata =

Species of orchid bee

Eulaema cingulata is a large-bodied black and orange corbiculate bee in the genus Eulaema. It is characterized by its size and flashy orange segments of its metastoma. Unlike other Eulaema, E. cingulata has white markings on its face. Specifically, T1 andT3 are black while T2 and T4 through T7 are cream or slightly orange in color. These bees are easily mistaken for bumblebees (Bombus spp.). However, they are actually members of the Euglossini, or orchid bees.

== Distribution ==
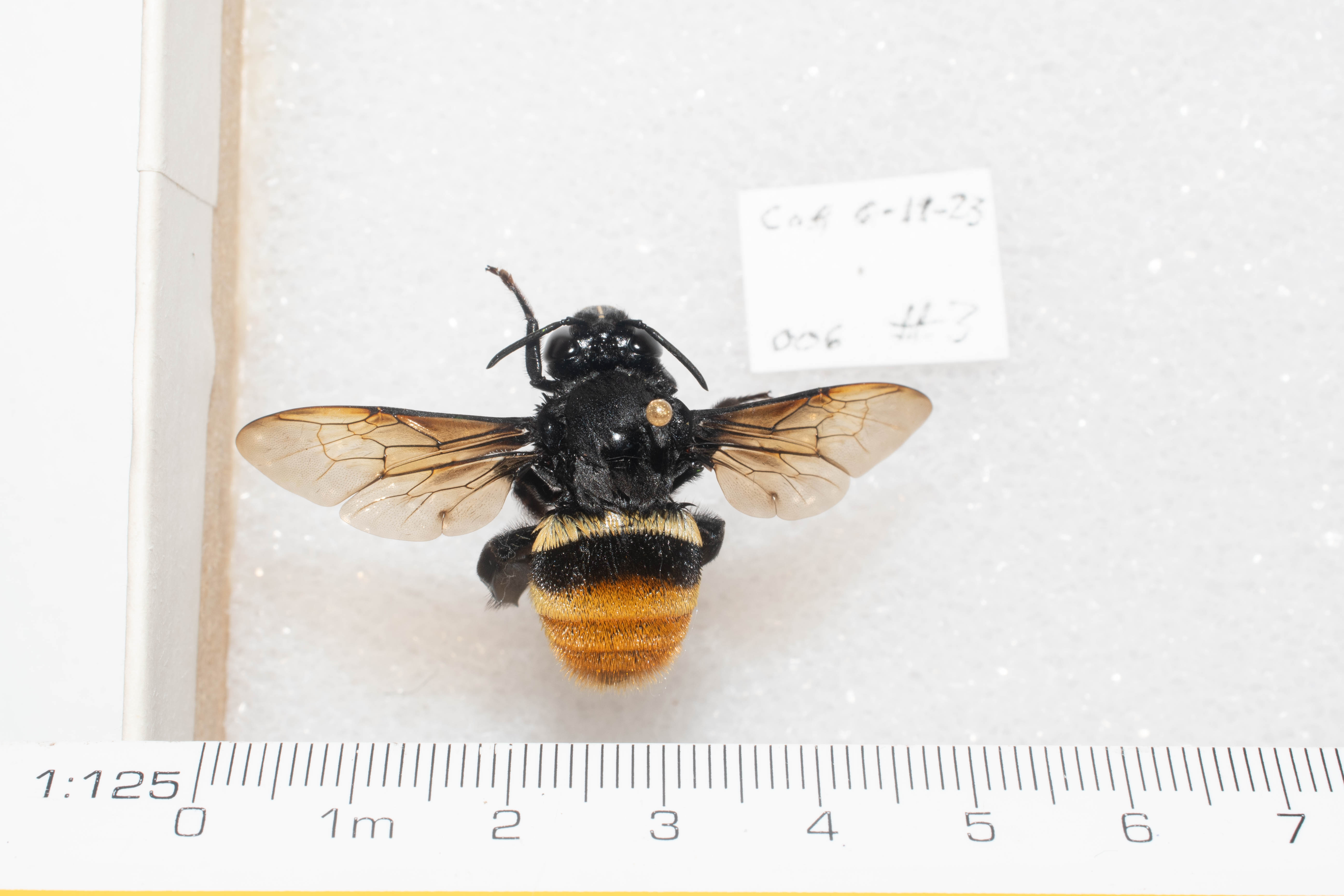
A top down view of E. cingulata demonstrating the colorful bands on the metastoma and general size of the bee.

E. cingulata can be found in the neotropics, extending its range from Mexico to Brazil. They can occur at elevations as high as 2500 m and persist in anthropogenically disturbed habitats.
