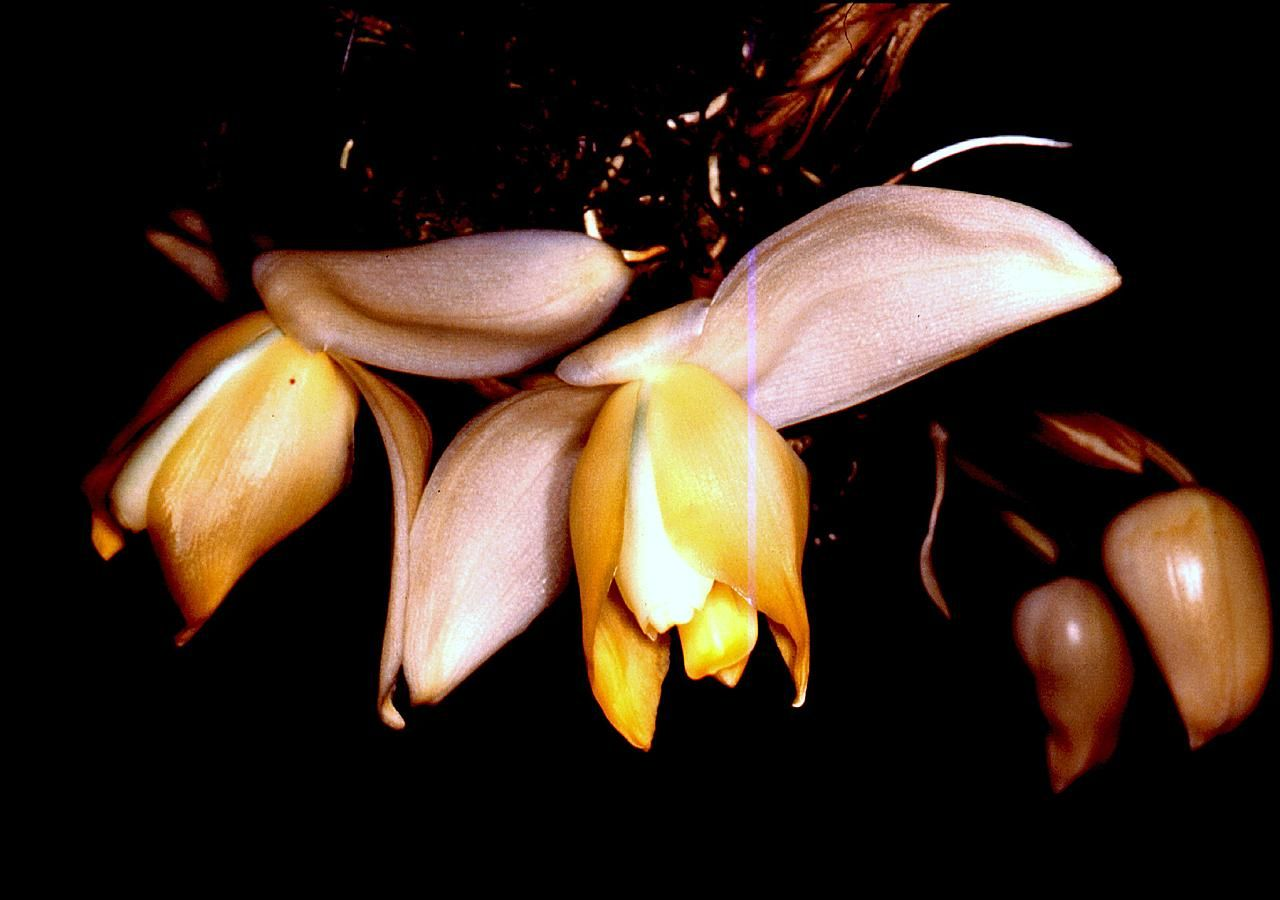
- Stanhopea tricornis flower

Scientific classification
- Kingdom: Plantae
- Clade: Tracheophytes
- Clade: Angiosperms
- Clade: Monocots
- Order: Asparagales
- Family: Orchidaceae
- Subfamily: Epidendroideae
- Genus: Stanhopea
- Species: S. tricornis

Binomial name
- Stanhopea tricornis Lindl.

Synonyms
- Stanhopea wallisii Rchb.f.; Stanhopea stenochila F.Lehm. & Kraenzl.; Stanhopea langlasseana Cogn.; Stanhopea convoluta Rolfe; Stanhopea tricornis ssp. stenochila (F.Lehm. & Kraenzl.) Dodson

= Stanhopea tricornis =

Species of orchid

Stanhopea tricornis is a species of orchid endemic to western South America (Colombia, Ecuador, Peru).
