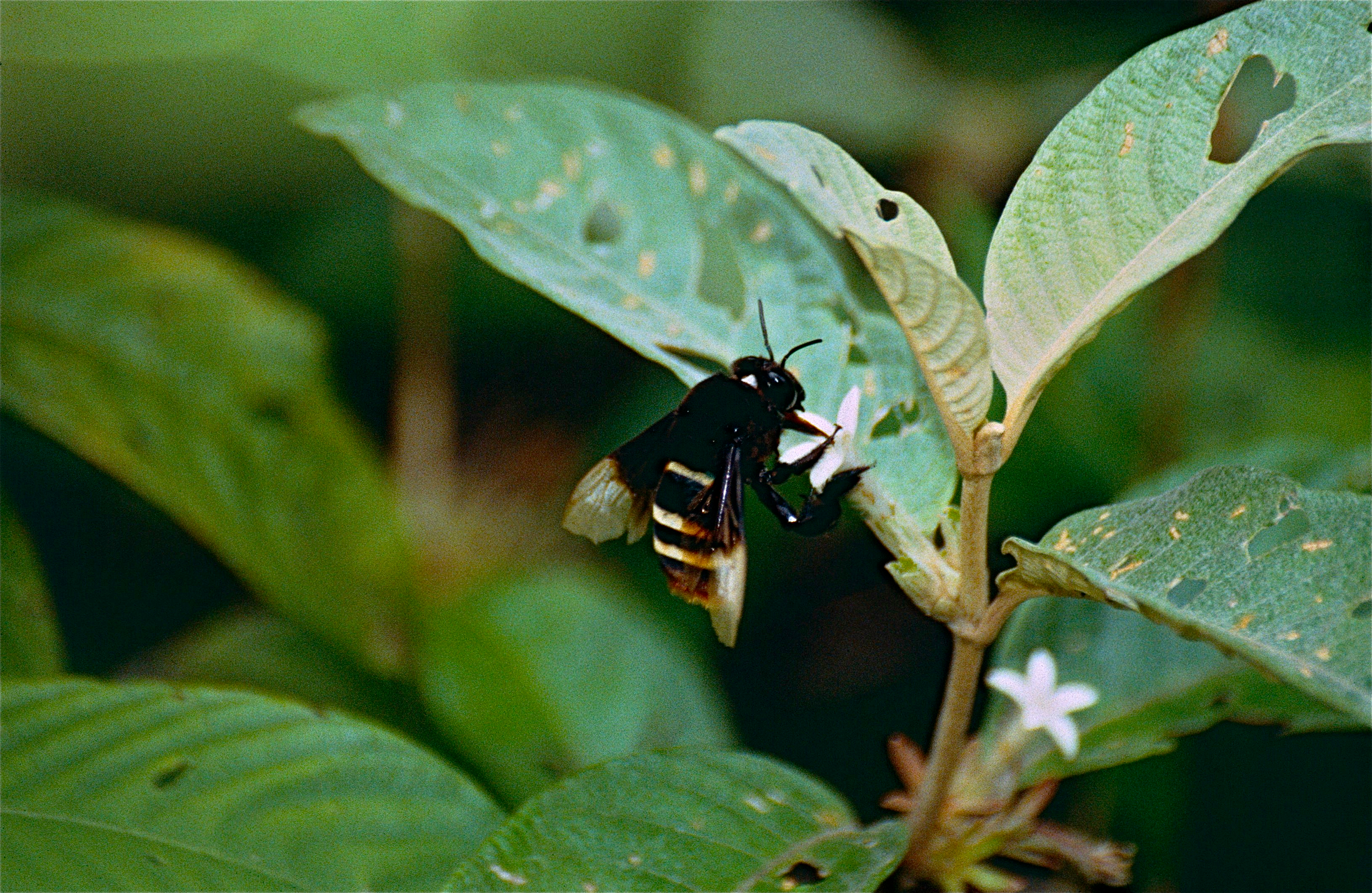

Scientific classification
- Kingdom: Animalia
- Phylum: Arthropoda
- Class: Insecta
- Order: Hymenoptera
- Family: Apidae
- Genus: Eulaema
- Species: E. bombiformis

Binomial name
- Eulaema bombiformis (Packard, 1869)

= Eulaema bombiformis =

Species of bee

Eulaema bombiformis is a large-bodied bee species in the tribe Euglossini, otherwise known as orchid bees. This species is primarily found in the neotropics, occurring throughout a range from Mexico to Brazil.
