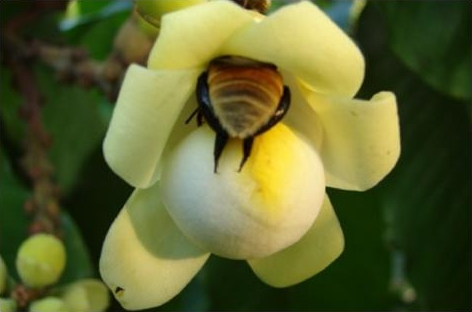
- Male Eulaema mocsaryi in Brazil nut flower

Scientific classification
- Domain: Eukaryota
- Kingdom: Animalia
- Phylum: Arthropoda
- Class: Insecta
- Order: Hymenoptera
- Family: Apidae
- Genus: Eulaema
- Species: E. mocsaryi

Binomial name
- Eulaema mocsaryi Friese, 1899

Synonyms
- Euglossa fallax Smith, 1854; Eulema fallax Smith, 1874

= Eulaema mocsaryi =

Species of bee

Eulaema mocsaryi is a species of large-bodied bee in the tribe Euglossini, the orchid bees. It was named in honour of the Hungarian entomologist Alexander Mocsáry, curator of the Hungarian Natural History Museum. It is native to forests in parts of tropical South America.

== Description ==
The head of Eulaema mocsaryi has a central raised ridge and both the head and thorax are clad in short velvety black hairs. The colour of the head and thorax is mainly black. The legs are black and hairy and the tibial joints of the hind legs are wide and compressed. The dark-coloured abdomen is densely covered with short tawny-yellowish hairs, becoming paler towards the tip of the abdomen.

== Distribution ==
Eulaema mocsaryi is native to the forests of Colombia, Surinam and the Amazon basin in Brazil.

== Ecology ==
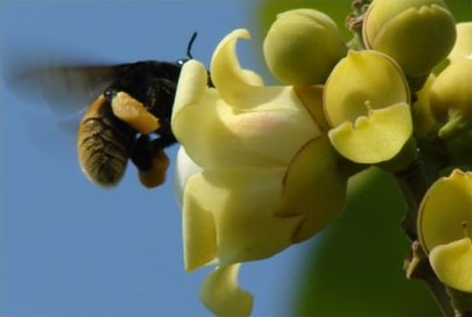
Female Eulaema mocsaryi with laden pollen baskets approaching flower of Brazil nut

Eulaema mocsaryi has been seen visiting the flowers of Solanum toxicarium and Polygala spectabilis. The male has a mutualistic relationship with the orchid Cattleya eldorado, from which it obtains fragrances which it stores in cavities in its hind legs.

Research was undertaken to identify which insects pollinated the flowers of the Brazil nut tree (Bertholletia excelsa). It was found that a number of species of bee did so and that Eulaema mocsaryi was one of the most frequent visitors and played an important role in pollination, visiting several flowers on each tree and moving from tree to tree. The researchers concluded that for successful pollination to take place in commercial Brazil nut plantations, the plantations needed to be surrounded by intact primary forest with its epiphytic orchid population to supply the other needs of these orchid bees.
