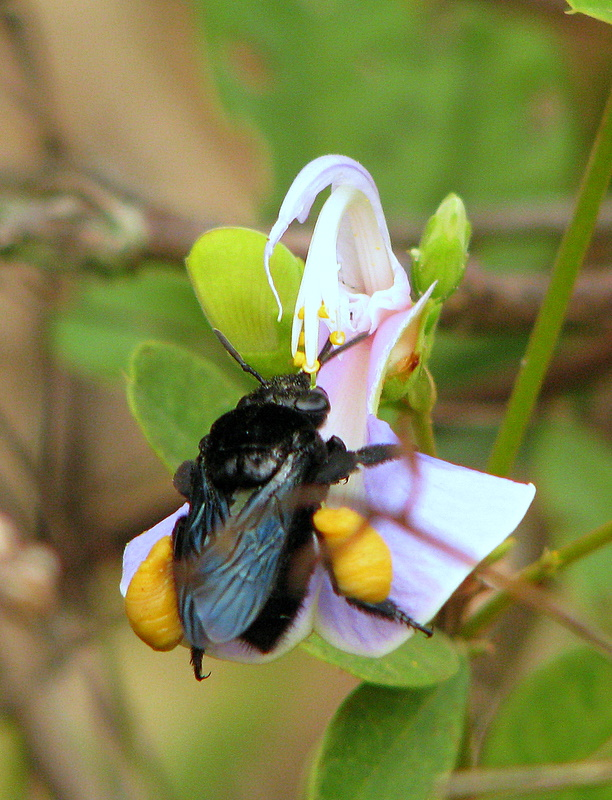
- Eulaema nigrita on a Periandra mediterranea flower

Scientific classification
- Kingdom: Animalia
- Phylum: Arthropoda
- Class: Insecta
- Order: Hymenoptera
- Family: Apidae
- Genus: Eulaema
- Species: E. nigrita

Binomial name
- Eulaema nigrita Lepeletier, 1841

Synonyms
- Centris nigrita raymondii Schrottky, 1907; Euglossa nigrita nigriceps Friese, 1923; Eulaema analis Lepeletier, 1841; Eulaema willei Moure, 1963

= Eulaema nigrita =

Species of bee

Eulaema nigrita is a species of large-bodied bee in the tribe Euglossini, the orchid bees. It is commonly known as the black orchid bee. It is found from Costa Rica through northern Argentina. The species nests in pre-existing cavities.
