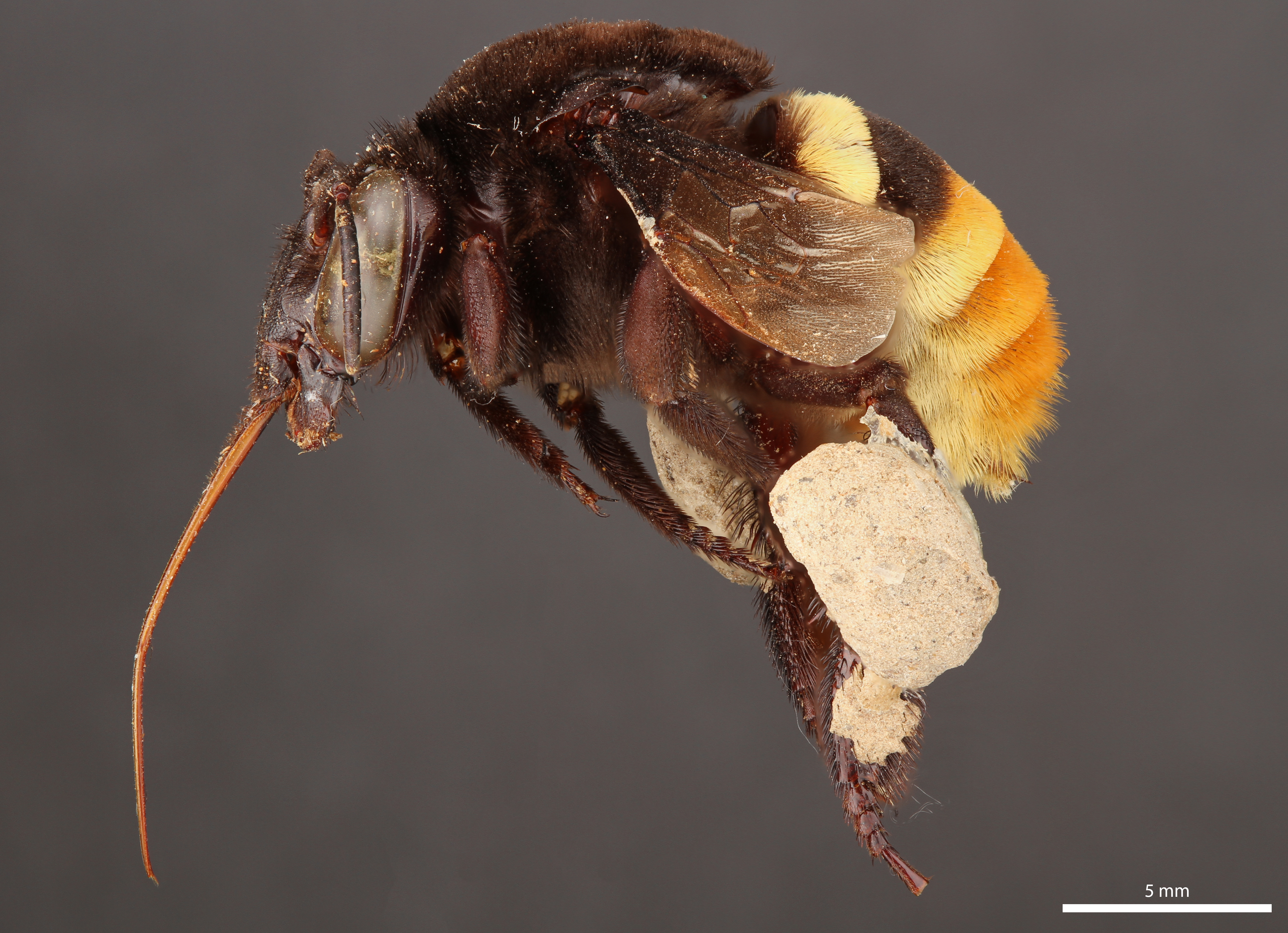
- Eulaema cingulata specimen

Scientific classification
- Kingdom: Animalia
- Phylum: Arthropoda
- Clade: Pancrustacea
- Class: Insecta
- Order: Hymenoptera
- Family: Apidae
- Tribe: Euglossini
- Genus: Eulaema; Lepeletier, 1841

Diversity
- c. 25 species

= Eulaema =

Genus of bees

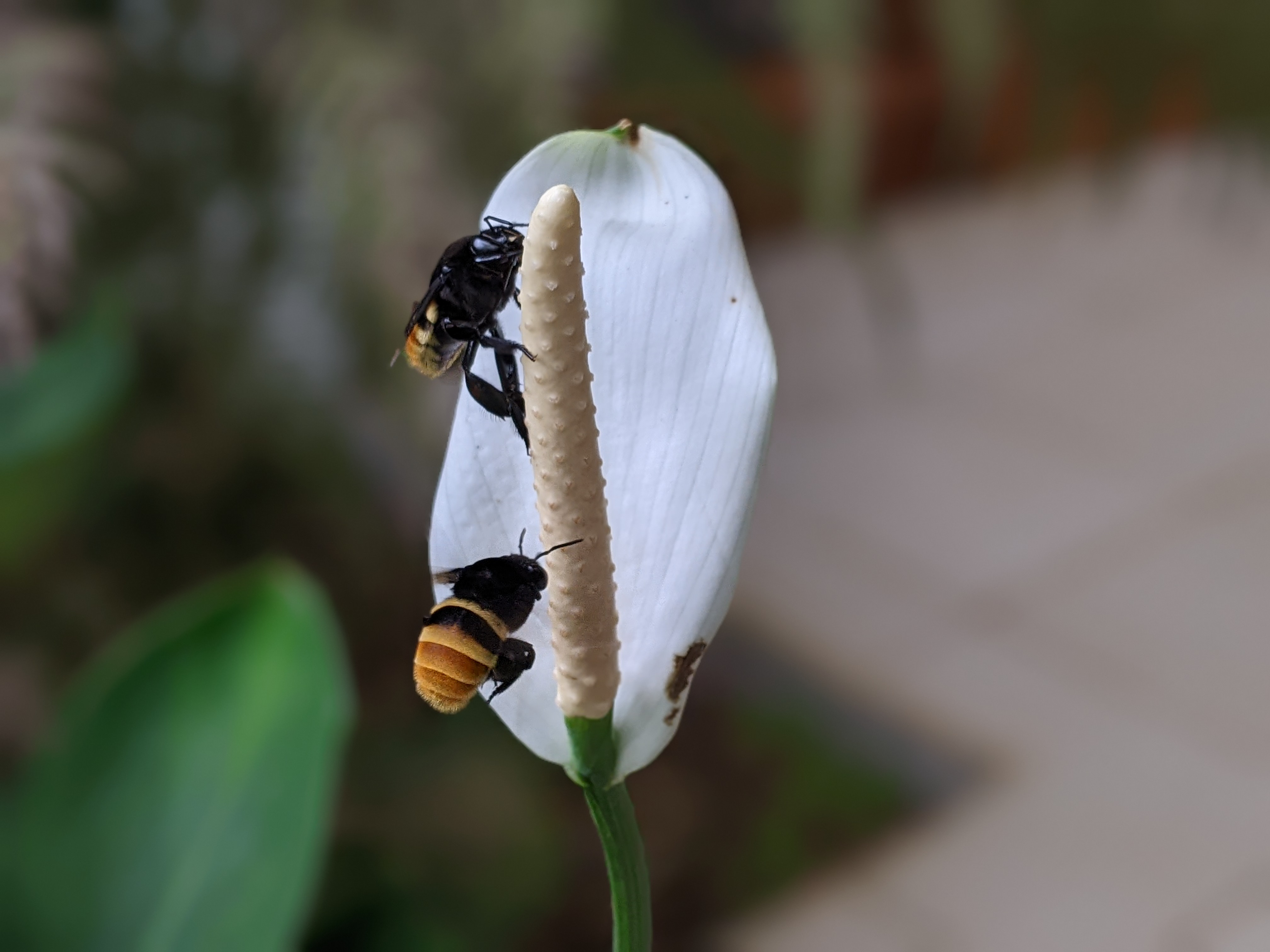
Two Eulaema sp. visiting Spathiphyllum sp. plant.

Eulaema is a genus of large-bodied euglossine bees that occur primarily in the Neotropics. They are robust brown or black bees, hairy or velvety, and often striped with yellow or orange, typically resembling bumblebees. They lack metallic coloration as occurs in the related genus Eufriesea.

== Distribution ==
Eulaema is found from Rio Grande do Sul (Brazil), Misiones (Argentina) and Paraguay to northern Mexico with occasional strays into the United States.

== Behavior ==
Like other euglossine bees, male Eulaema gather and store scents to attract females. Scientists use different mixes of scents to study these bees, including eugenol, cineole, vanillin, skatole and methyl salicylate. However, this list is not exhaustive. After collecting scents, males choose a branch or tree trunk in an area with more open canopy to make their displays. These displays consist of bouts of movement and buzzing before returning to their perch or mating. When they are not foraging and collecting scents, males may reuse refugia, like flowers, for sleeping. Females nest in tree hollows, buildings, or soil banks, with some reports of cooperative nesting. They collect nectar, pollen, and nest building materials such as mud, resin, and fecal matter to provision their young and build nests. Interestingly, scientists report a wide range of social habits in reproductive females. Some live in solitary nests while others live in large groups. One study reported a nest including two different species. There is not current evidence that generations overlap. So, it is unlikely that daughters stay in the nest to help rear more sisters or their own daughters. Despite their behavioral plasticity, Eulaema females are not eusocial. Daughters and sons leave the nest and reproduce separately, starting the cycle anew. While Eulaema generally reproduce year-round, local fluctuations in climate affect abundance and activity. For those interested in learning more, Eulaema meriana is a good species to start with.

== Species ==
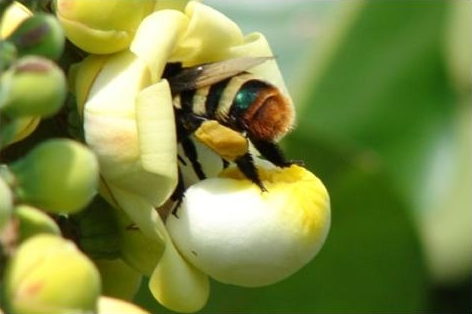
Eulaema meriana

- Eulaema atleticana Nemésio, 2009
- Eulaema basicincta Moure, 2000
- Eulaema bennetti Moure, 1967
- Eulaema boliviensis (Friese, 1898)
- Eulaema bombiformis (Packard, 1869)
- Eulaema bomboides (Friese, 1923)
- Eulaema chocoana Ospina-Torres & Sandino-Franco, 1997
- Eulaema cingulata (Fabricius, 1804)
- Eulaema felipei Nemésio, 2010
- Eulaema flavescens (Friese, 1899)
- Eulaema helvola Moure, 2000
- Eulaema leucopyga (Friese, 1898)
- Eulaema luteola Moure, 1967
- Eulaema meriana (Olivier, 1789)
- Eulaema mimetica Moure, 1967
- Eulaema mocsaryi (Friese, 1899)
- Eulaema napensis Oliveira, 2006
- Eulaema nigrita Lepeletier, 1841
- Eulaema parapolyzona Oliveira, 2006
- Eulaema peruviana (Friese, 1903)
- Eulaema polychroma (Mocsáry, 1899)
- Eulaema polyzona (Mocsáry, 1897)
- Eulaema pseudocingulata Oliveira, 2006
- Eulaema quadragintanovem (Nemésio, 2012)
- Eulaema seabrai Moure, 1960
- Eulaema sororia Dressler & Ospina-Torres, 1997
- Eulaema speciosa (Mocsáry, 1897)
- Eulaema tenuifasciata (Friese, 1925)
- Eulaema terminata (Smith, 1874)
