= Helmet-flower =

Helmet-flower is a common name for several plants and may refer to:

- Aconitum napellus, in the family Ranunculaceae and endemic to Europe
- Coryanthes spp., in the family Orchidaceae
- Scutellaria spp., in the family Lamiaceae
