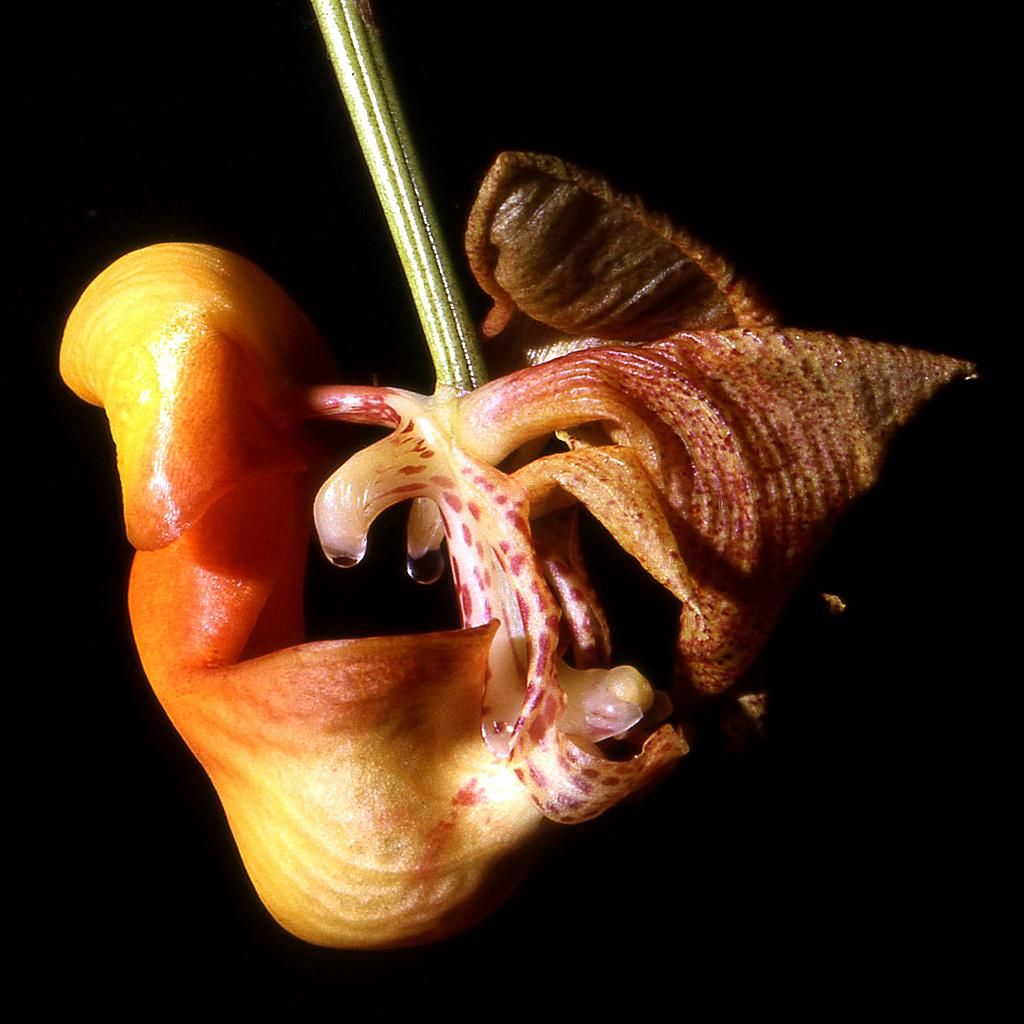

Scientific classification
- Kingdom: Plantae
- Clade: Tracheophytes
- Clade: Angiosperms
- Clade: Monocots
- Order: Asparagales
- Family: Orchidaceae
- Subfamily: Epidendroideae
- Genus: Coryanthes
- Species: C. maculata

Binomial name
- Coryanthes maculata Hook. (1831)

Synonyms
- Corysanthes maculata (Hook.) Heynh. (1840); Coryanthes maculata var. parkeri Hook. (1839); Coryanthes parkeri (Hook.) Endl. (1845); Coryanthes barkeri Beer (1854), in error

= Coryanthes maculata =

Species of orchid

Coryanthes maculata is a species of orchid found in Brazil, Venezuela, Guyana and French Guiana. It is the type species of the genus Coryanthes.
