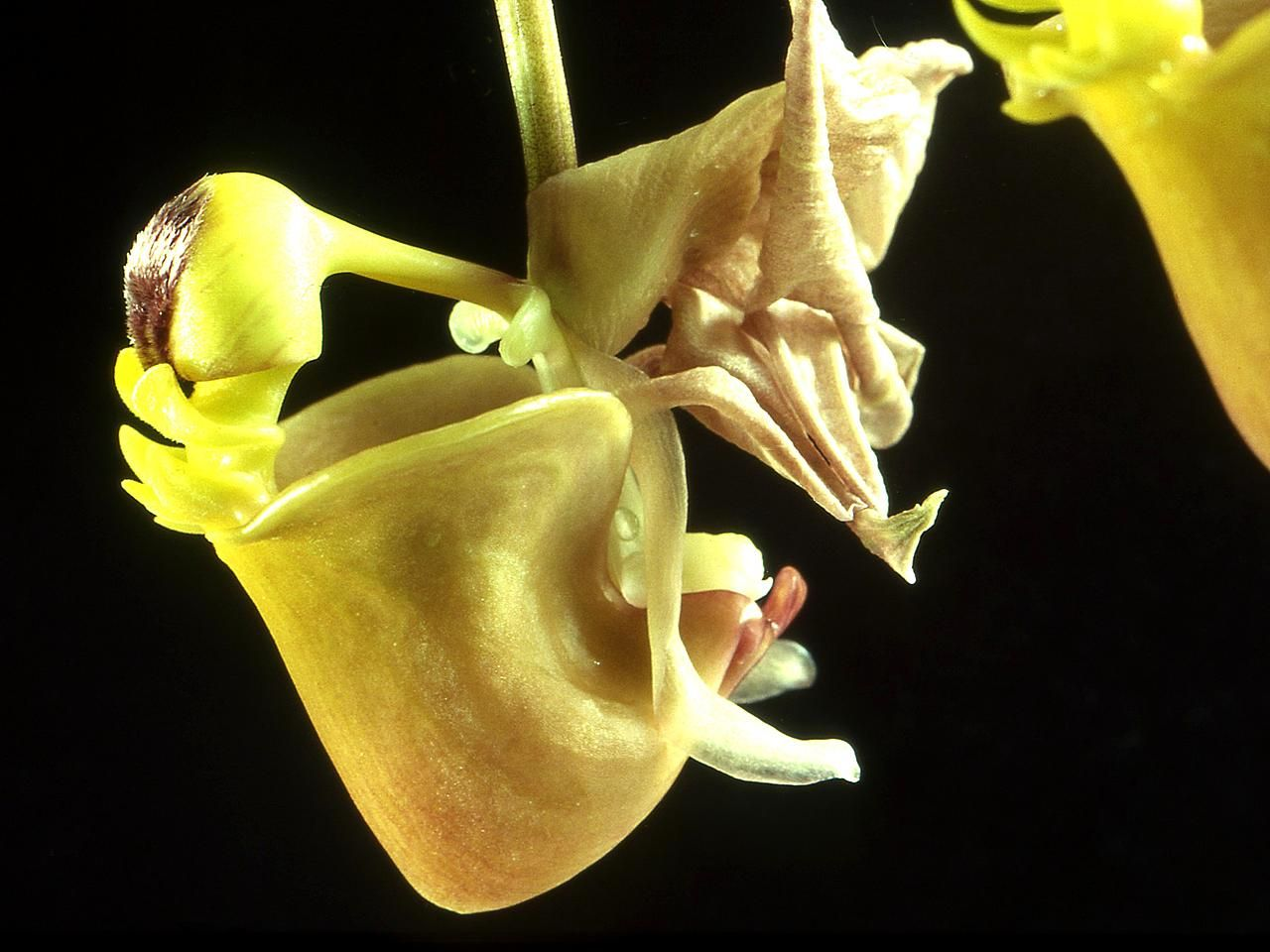

Scientific classification
- Kingdom: Plantae
- Clade: Tracheophytes
- Clade: Angiosperms
- Clade: Monocots
- Order: Asparagales
- Family: Orchidaceae
- Subfamily: Epidendroideae
- Genus: Coryanthes
- Species: C. trifoliata

Binomial name
- Coryanthes trifoliata C. Schweinf. (1944)

= Coryanthes trifoliata =

Species of orchid in peru

Coryanthes trifoliata is a species of orchid found in Peru.
