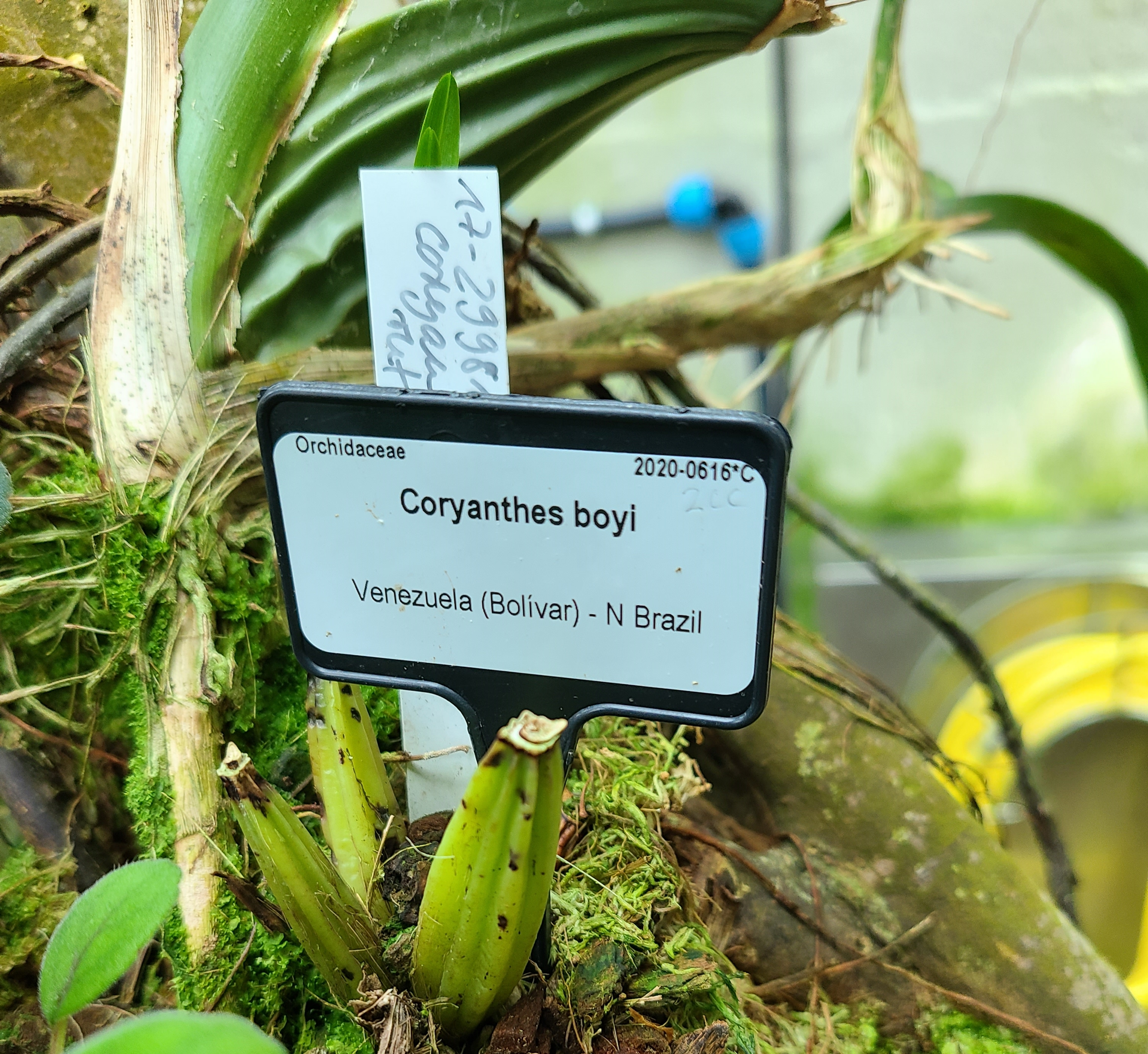

Scientific classification
- Kingdom: Plantae
- Clade: Tracheophytes
- Clade: Angiosperms
- Clade: Monocots
- Order: Asparagales
- Family: Orchidaceae
- Subfamily: Epidendroideae
- Genus: Coryanthes
- Species: C. boyi

Binomial name
- Coryanthes boyi Mansf. (1928)

Synonyms
- Coryanthes rutkisii Foldats (1969)

= Coryanthes boyi =

Species of orchid

Coryanthes boyi, also known by the common name Boy's coryanthese, is a species of epiphytic bucket orchid boasting green flowers dotted with tight purple-brown blotches. It is native to Venezuela and northern Brazil growing at an elevations of 1000 to 1500 meters. No subspecies are listed in the Catalogue of Life.
