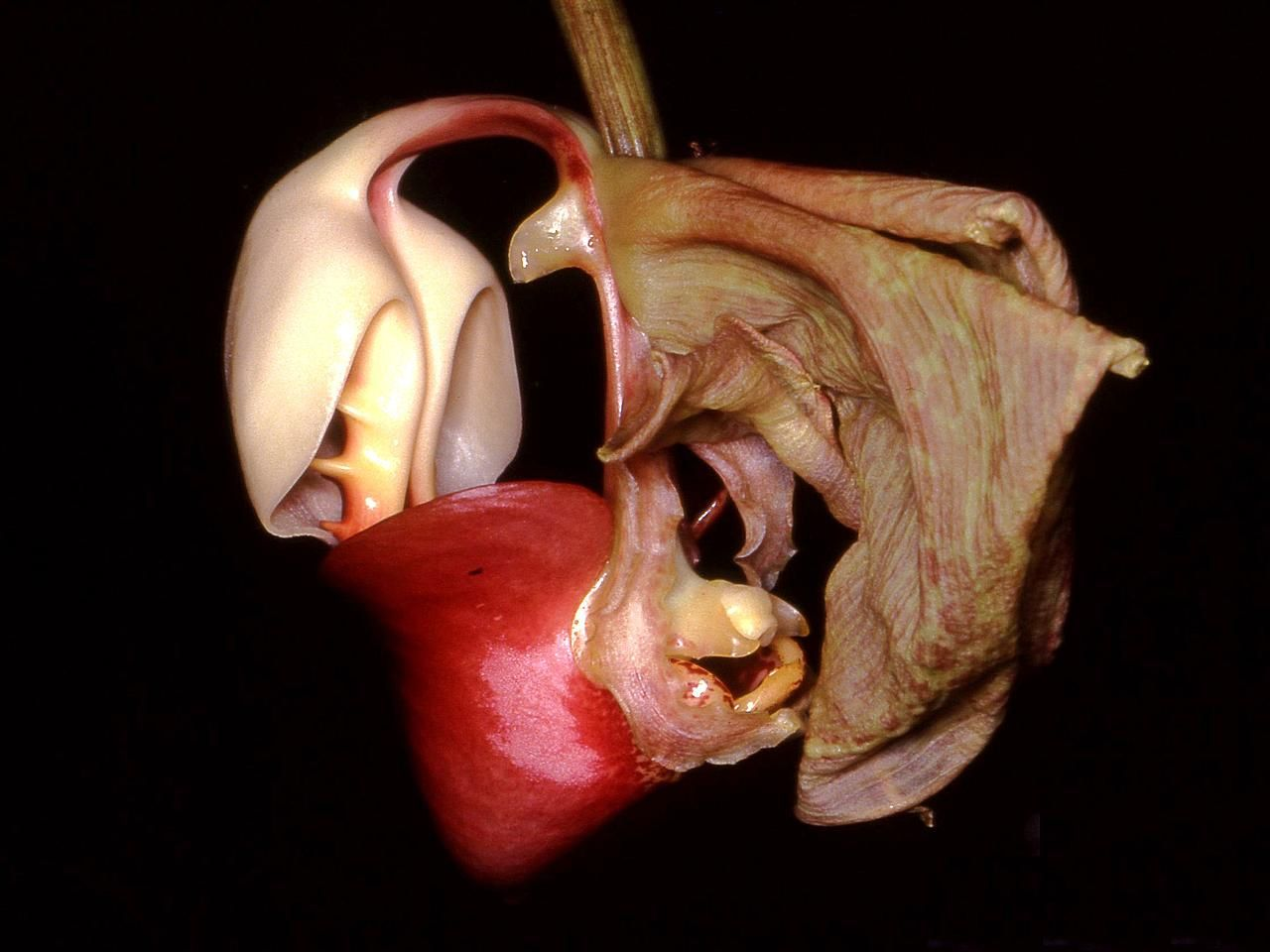

Scientific classification
- Kingdom: Plantae
- Clade: Tracheophytes
- Clade: Angiosperms
- Clade: Monocots
- Order: Asparagales
- Family: Orchidaceae
- Subfamily: Epidendroideae
- Genus: Coryanthes
- Species: C. leucocorys

Binomial name
- Coryanthes leucocorys Rolfe 1891

= Coryanthes leucocorys =

Species of orchid

Coryanthes leucocorys is a species of orchid found in Colombia, Ecuador and Peru.
