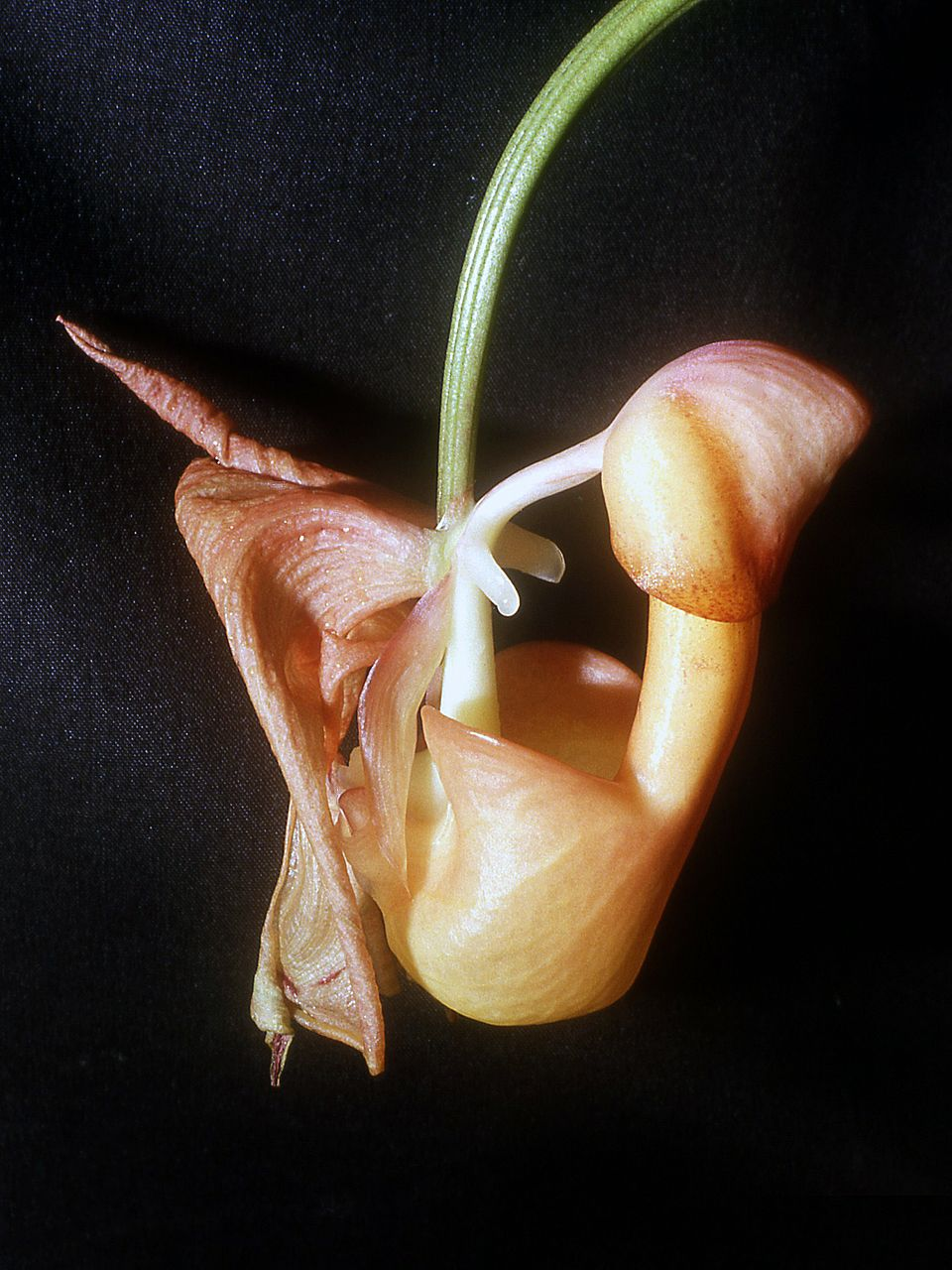

Scientific classification
- Kingdom: Plantae
- Clade: Tracheophytes
- Clade: Angiosperms
- Clade: Monocots
- Order: Asparagales
- Family: Orchidaceae
- Subfamily: Epidendroideae
- Genus: Coryanthes
- Species: C. mastersiana

Binomial name
- Coryanthes mastersiana F. Lehm. (1891)

= Coryanthes mastersiana =

Species of orchid

Coryanthes mastersiana is a species of orchid found in Colombia and Ecuador.
