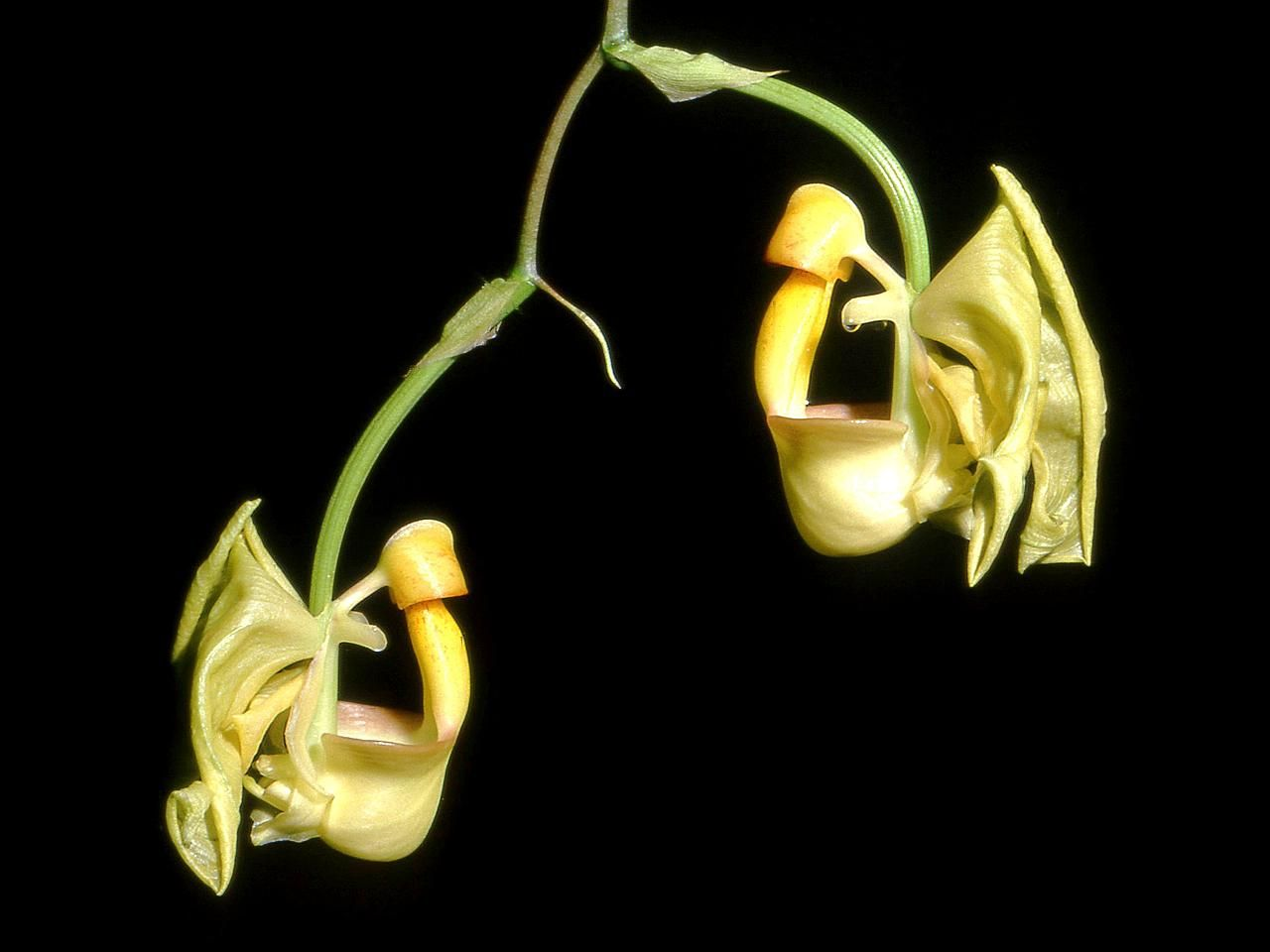

Scientific classification
- Kingdom: Plantae
- Clade: Tracheophytes
- Clade: Angiosperms
- Clade: Monocots
- Order: Asparagales
- Family: Orchidaceae
- Subfamily: Epidendroideae
- Genus: Coryanthes
- Species: C. speciosa

Binomial name
- Coryanthes speciosa Hook. (1831)

Synonyms
- Gongora speciosa (Hook.) Hook. (1827); Meliclis speciosa (Hook.) Raf. (1837); Coryanthes maculata var. splendens (Barb.Rodr.) Cogn. (1902)

= Coryanthes speciosa =

Species of orchid

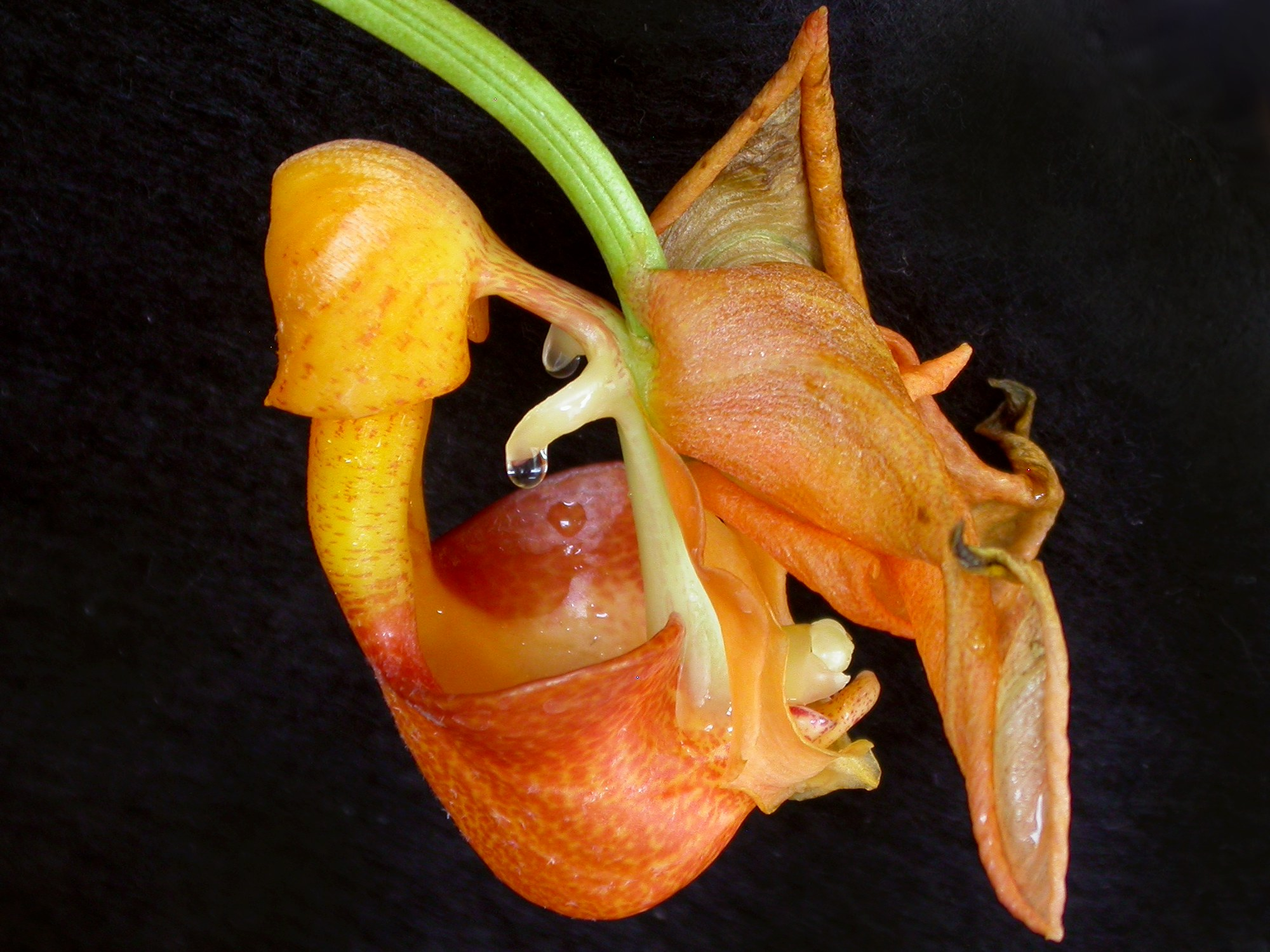
Coryanthes speciosa

Coryanthes speciosa, the bat orchid, is a species of orchid found in Brazil, Colombia, Costa Rica, French Guiana, Guatemala, Guyana, Honduras, Mexico, Nicaragua, Panama, Peru, Suriname, Venezuela, the Caribbean and Belize.

As noted by the position of the "bucket", liquid drops in from above by a special stem gland. The bucket fills, nectar drinking organisms such as bees are attracted to the sweet drops forming above the bucket. As the bees jostle for position, some bees inadvertently fall into the bucket. The bucket's fluid levels are regulated by a spout that allows overflowing liquid to be released. This is the only escape for the drowning bees. Whilst traveling through the spout, the anther's of the plant produce pollen that then sticks to the escaping bee. Positioned perfectly at the end of the spout lies the stigma that must be crossed by the frantic bee. Pollination is then assured, the bee is free to try its luck on other plants nearby. Thus, even cross pollination is virtually inevitable.
