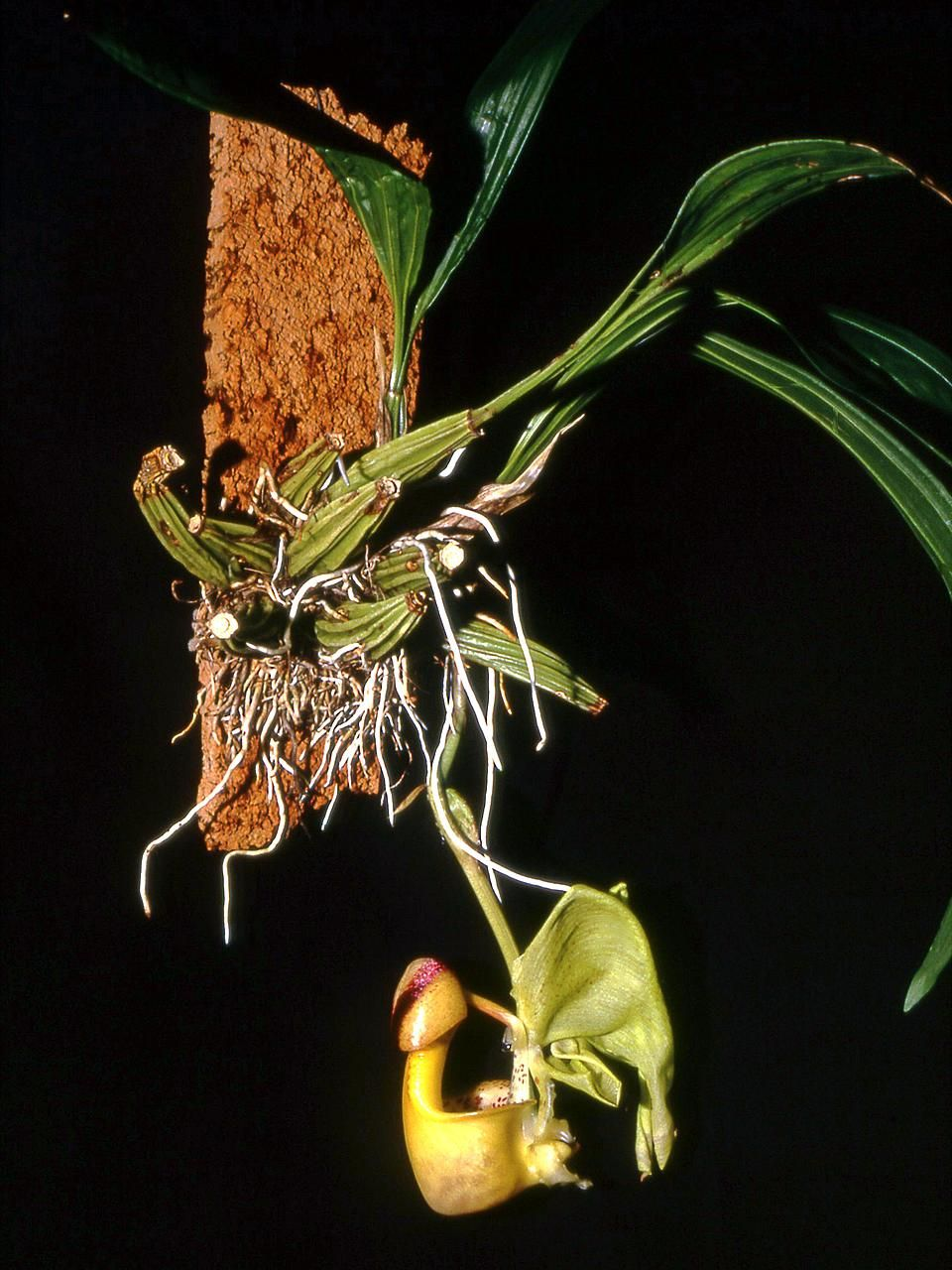

Scientific classification
- Kingdom: Plantae
- Clade: Tracheophytes
- Clade: Angiosperms
- Clade: Monocots
- Order: Asparagales
- Family: Orchidaceae
- Subfamily: Epidendroideae
- Genus: Coryanthes
- Species: C. verrucolineata

Binomial name
- Coryanthes verrucolineata G.Gerlach (1989)

= Coryanthes verrucolineata =

Species of orchid

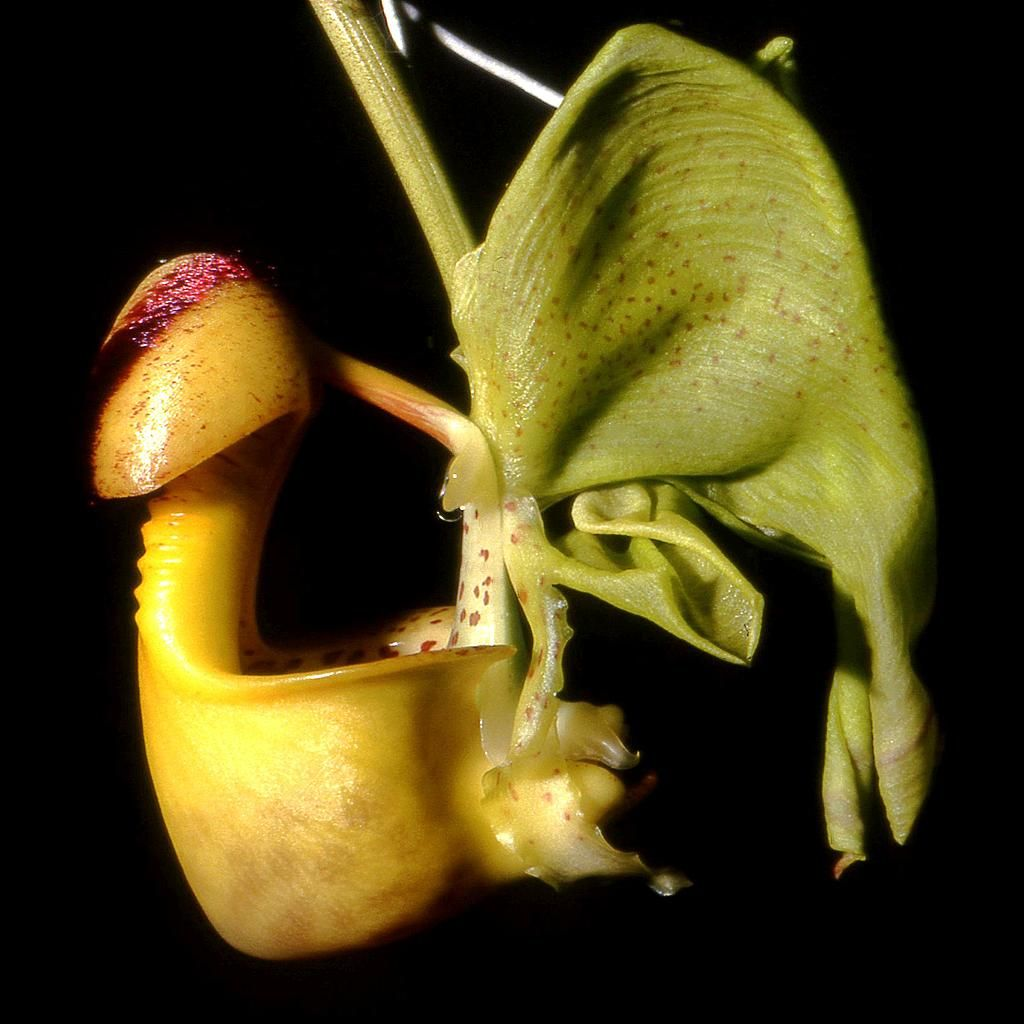
Coryanthes verrucolineata flower

Coryanthes verrucolineata is a species of bucket orchid discovered in Peru, and first described in 1989. This orchid is known to occur as an epiphyte at lower altitudes within tropical rainforests. It blooms between summer and early autumn and has a pendant inflorescence, bearing between one and four large flowers, each some 8 centimetres (3.1 in) in size.

Like all other orchids in the genus Coryanthes that have been investigated, it is known to be pollinated by male euglossine bees (also known as orchid bees), which are attracted to its large, fragrant flowers.
