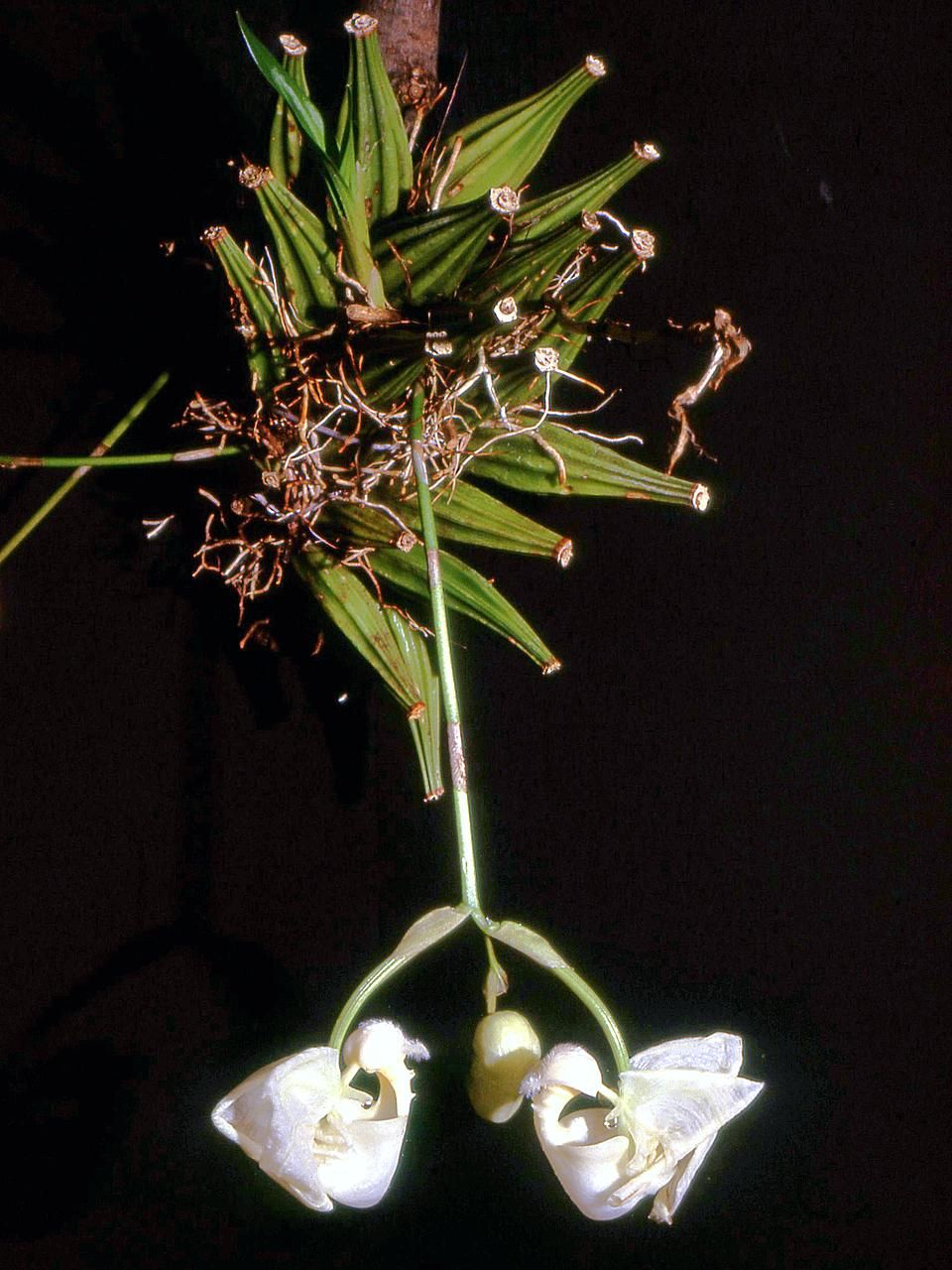

Scientific classification
- Kingdom: Plantae
- Clade: Tracheophytes
- Clade: Angiosperms
- Clade: Monocots
- Order: Asparagales
- Family: Orchidaceae
- Subfamily: Epidendroideae
- Genus: Coryanthes
- Species: C. alborosea

Binomial name
- Coryanthes alborosea C. Schweinf. (1943)

= Coryanthes alborosea =

Species of orchid

Coryanthes alborosea is a species of Coryanthes (bucket orchids) found in Peru.
