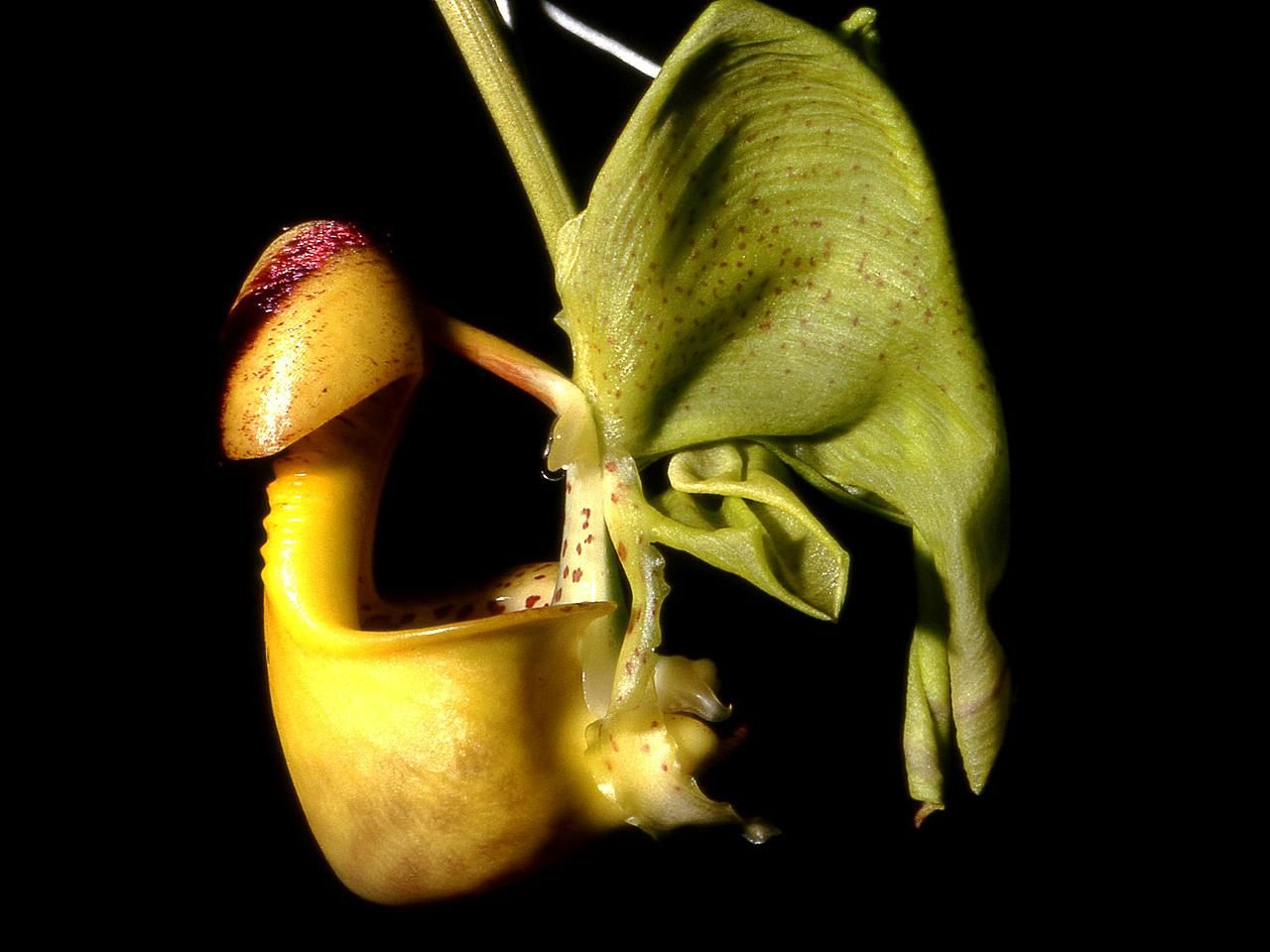

Scientific classification
- Kingdom: Plantae
- Clade: Tracheophytes
- Clade: Angiosperms
- Clade: Monocots
- Order: Asparagales
- Family: Orchidaceae
- Subfamily: Epidendroideae
- Genus: Coryanthes
- Species: C. macrantha

Binomial name
- Coryanthes macrantha (Hook.) Hook.

Synonyms
- Gongora macrantha Hook.; Panstrepis paradoxa Raf.

= Coryanthes macrantha =

Species of orchid

Coryanthes macrantha commonly called the Bucket Orchid, or Monkey's Throat Orchid is an epiphytic orchid from the genus Coryanthes. It is native to Trinidad and to South America (Brazil, Venezuela, Colombia, Peru, Suriname, Guyana, French Guiana). The fragrant plant is pollinated by the typical Euglossini bees (an Eulaema species) These bees are part of what is probably the most complicated pollination scheme presently known in nature. and has one of the largest orchid blooms, sometimes weighing up to 100 grams (3.5 ounces) and measuring up to five inches (12.5 centimeters) in width and height. In Trinidad and Tobago the flower has reached a width and height of six Inches (fifteen centimeters) The color is usually yellow to orange with small freckles along some parts of the flower, mainly inside the "bucket". But of course there are many different forms so it is not a rule.
