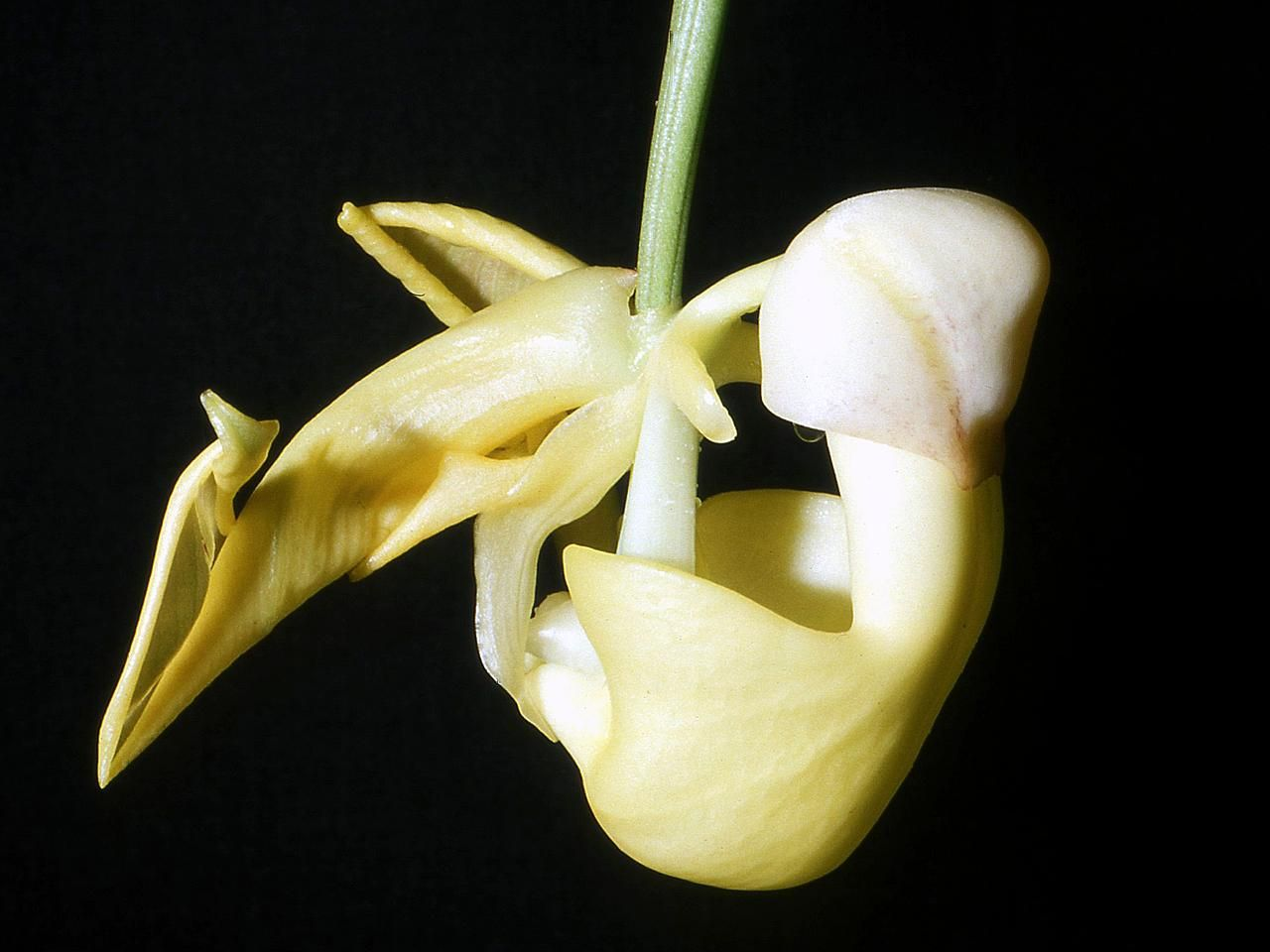

Scientific classification
- Kingdom: Plantae
- Clade: Tracheophytes
- Clade: Angiosperms
- Clade: Monocots
- Order: Asparagales
- Family: Orchidaceae
- Subfamily: Epidendroideae
- Genus: Coryanthes
- Species: C. hunteriana

Binomial name
- Coryanthes hunteriana Schltr. (1922)

= Coryanthes hunteriana =

Species of orchid

Coryanthes hunteriana is a species of orchid. This plant can be found in Costa Rica and Panama.
