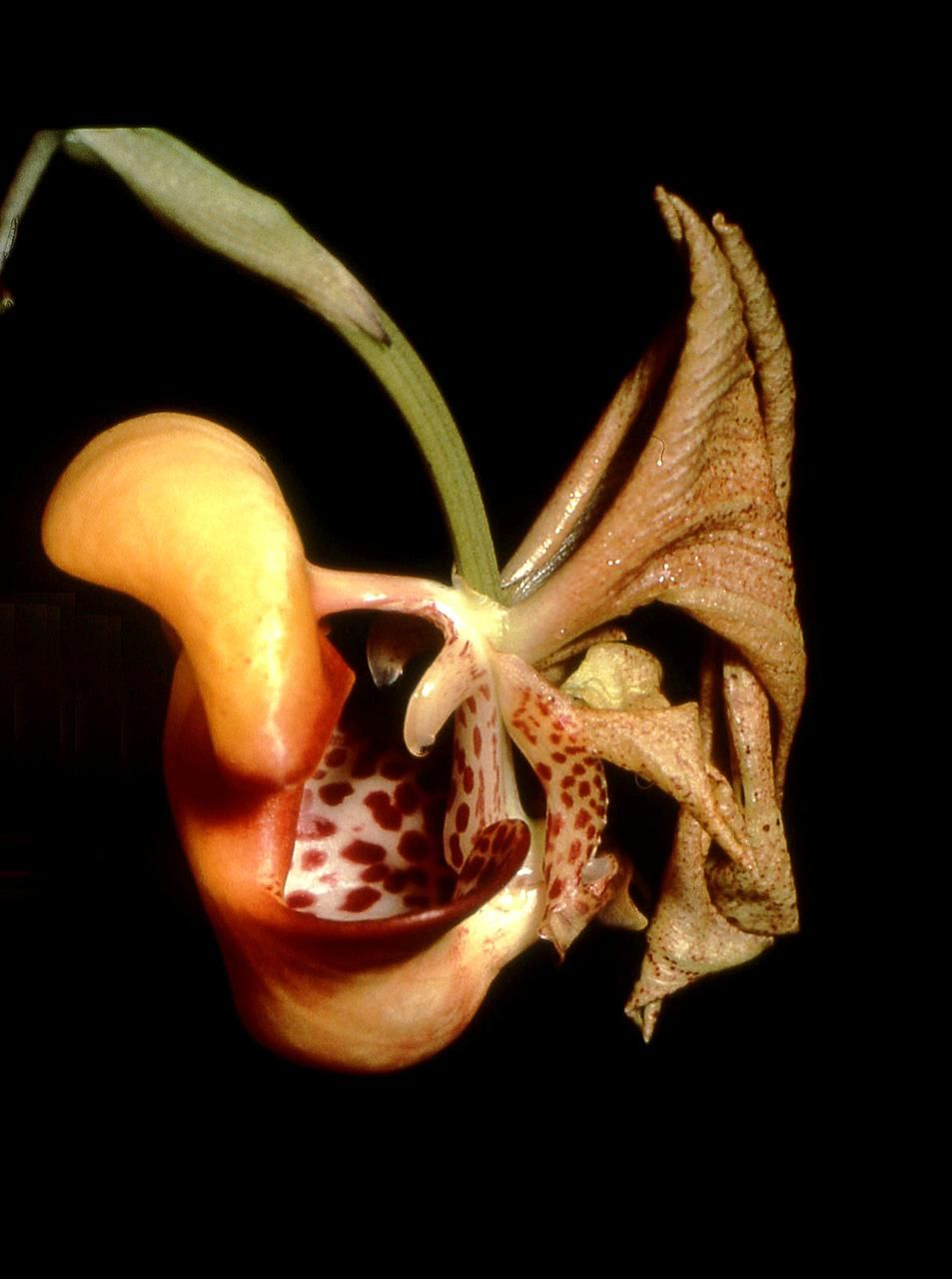

Scientific classification
- Kingdom: Plantae
- Clade: Tracheophytes
- Clade: Angiosperms
- Clade: Monocots
- Order: Asparagales
- Family: Orchidaceae
- Subfamily: Epidendroideae
- Genus: Coryanthes
- Species: C. picturata

Binomial name
- Coryanthes picturata Rchb.f. (1864)

= Coryanthes picturata =

Species of orchid

Coryanthes picturata is a species of orchid found in Belize, Costa Rica, Guatemala, Honduras, Mexico, Nicaragua and Panama.
