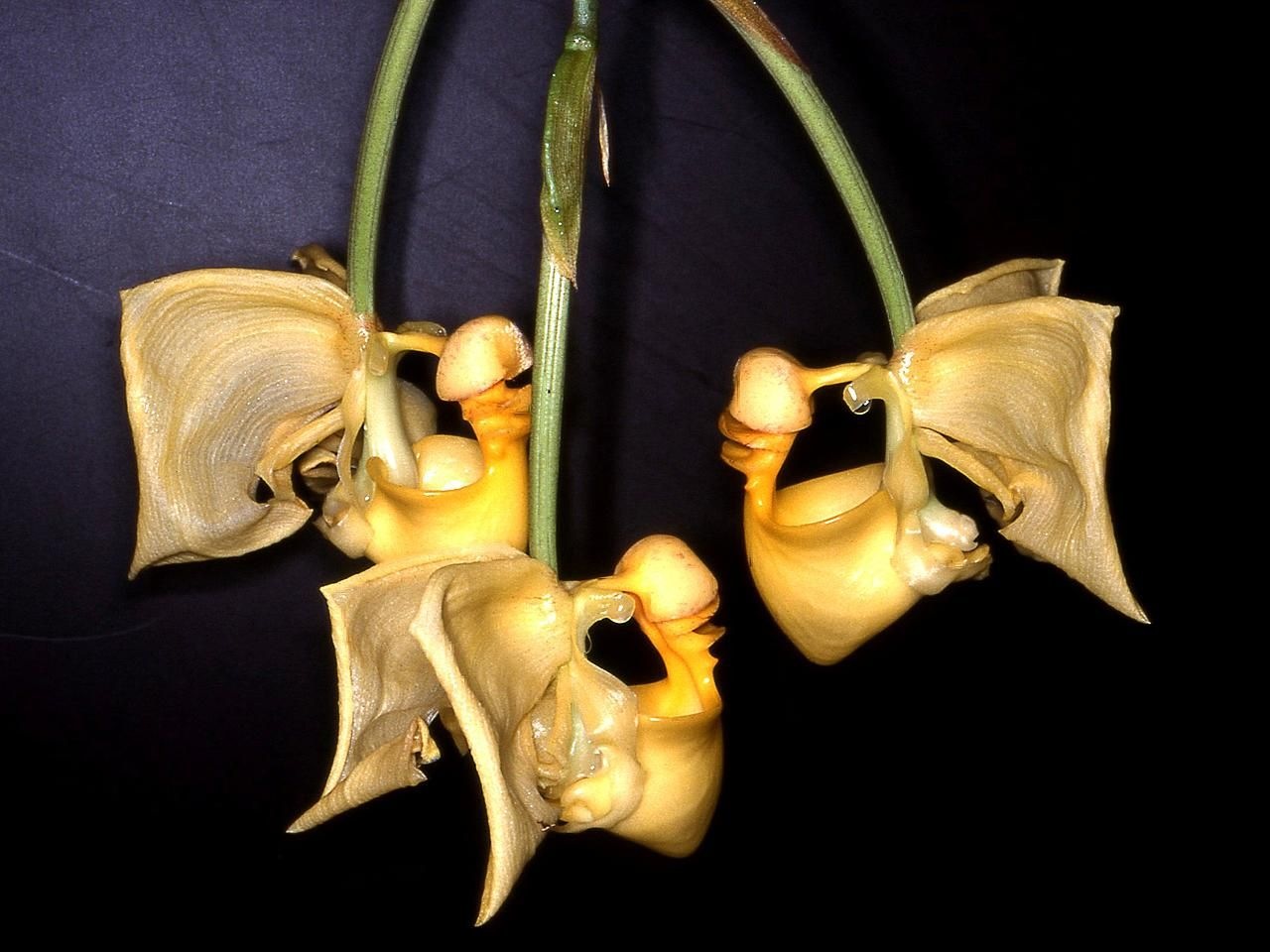

Scientific classification
- Kingdom: Plantae
- Clade: Tracheophytes
- Clade: Angiosperms
- Clade: Monocots
- Order: Asparagales
- Family: Orchidaceae
- Subfamily: Epidendroideae
- Genus: Coryanthes
- Species: C. gerlachiana

Binomial name
- Coryanthes gerlachiana Senghas & Seeger (1993)

= Coryanthes gerlachiana =

Species of orchid

Coryanthes gerlachiana is a species of orchid endemic to Bolivia.
