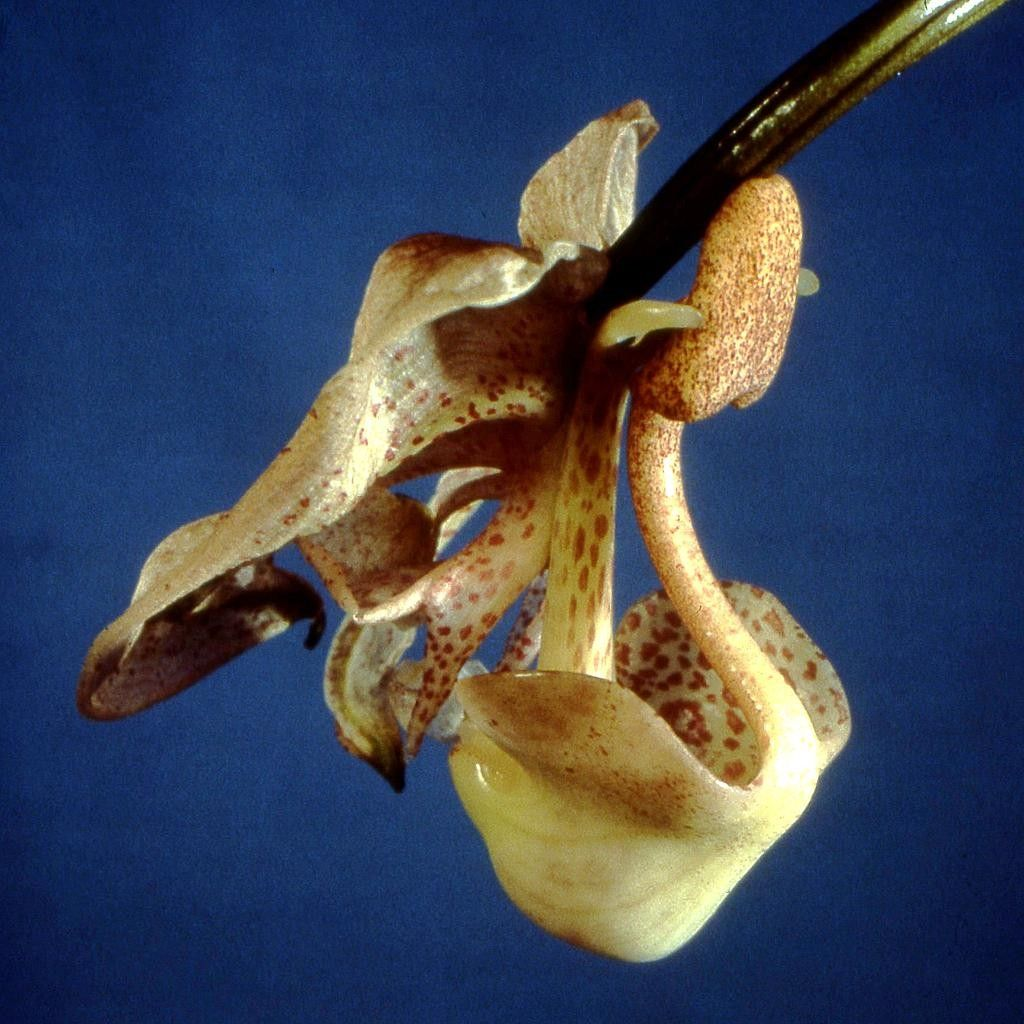

Scientific classification
- Kingdom: Plantae
- Clade: Tracheophytes
- Clade: Angiosperms
- Clade: Monocots
- Order: Asparagales
- Family: Orchidaceae
- Subfamily: Epidendroideae
- Genus: Coryanthes
- Species: C. macrocorys

Binomial name
- Coryanthes macrocorys Rolfe (1892)

= Coryanthes macrocorys =

Species of orchid

Coryanthes macrocorys is a species of orchid found in Peru.
