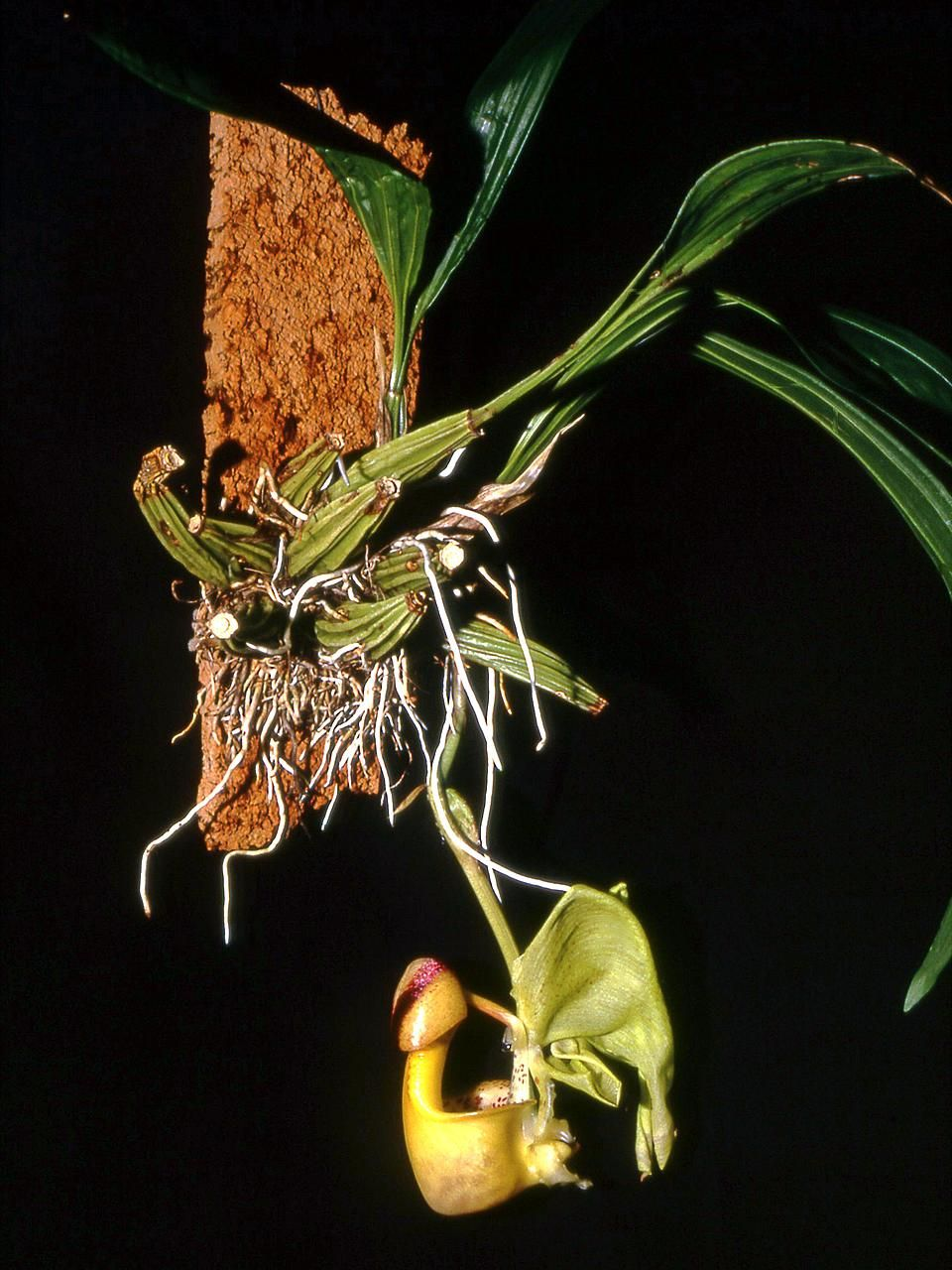
- Coryanthes verrucolineata

Scientific classification
- Kingdom: Plantae
- Clade: Tracheophytes
- Clade: Angiosperms
- Clade: Monocots
- Order: Asparagales
- Family: Orchidaceae
- Subfamily: Epidendroideae
- Tribe: Cymbidieae
- Subtribe: Stanhopeinae
- Genus: Coryanthes; Hook.

Species
- Coryanthes albertinae; Coryanthes alborosea; Coryanthes balfouriana; Coryanthes barkeri; Coryanthes bergoldii; Coryanthes bicolorata; Coryanthes biflora; Coryanthes bruchmuelleri; Coryanthes boyi; Coryanthes colinata; Coryanthes elegantium; Coryanthes eximia; Coryanthes gerlachiana; Coryanthes gernotii; Coryanthes hunteriana; Coryanthes leucocorys; Coryanthes macrantha; Coryanthes macrocorys; Coryanthes maculata; Coryanthes mastersiana; Coryanthes misasii; Coryanthes parkeri; Coryanthes picturata; Coryanthes punctata; Coryanthes powellii; Coryanthes sanderi; Coryanthes speciosa; Coryanthes splendens; Coryanthes sumnerana; Coryanthes trifoliata; Coryanthes vasquezii; Coryanthes verrucolineata; Coryanthes wolfii

Synonyms
- Meciclis Raf.; Panstrepis Raf.

= Coryanthes =

Bucket orchids

Genus of orchids

Coryanthes, commonly known as bucket orchids, is a genus of neotropical epiphytic orchids (family Orchidaceae). This genus is abbreviated as Crths in horticultural trade. They are native to South America, Central America, Mexico and Trinidad.

Bucket orchids are an excellent example of coevolution and mutualism, as the orchids have evolved along with orchid bees (the tribe Euglossini of the family Apidae) and both depend on each other for reproduction. One to three flowers are borne on a pendant stem that comes from the base of the pseudobulbs. The flower secretes a fluid (see Coryanthes alborosea picture) into the flower lip, which is shaped like a bucket. The male orchid bees (not the females) are attracted to the flower by a strong scent from aromatic oils, which they store in specialized spongy pouches inside their swollen hind legs, as they appear to use the scent in their courtship dances in order to attract females. The bees, trying to get the waxy substance containing the scent, sometimes fall to the fluid-filled bucket. As they are trying to escape, they find that there are some small knobs on which they can climb on, while the rest of the lip is lined with smooth, downward-pointing hairs, upon which their claws cannot find a grip. The knobs lead to a spout (see the Coryanthes leucocorys picture), but as the bee is trying to escape, the spout constricts. At that same moment, the small packets containing the pollen of the orchid are pressed against the thorax of the bee. However, the glue on the pollen packets does not set immediately, so the orchid keeps the bee trapped until the glue has set. Once the glue has set, the bee is let free and he can now dry his wings and fly off. This may have taken as long as 45 minutes. Pollination is completed if the bee goes to another Coryanthes flower, where, if the orchid is to be successful at reproducing, the bee again falls into the bucket of another flower of the same species. This time the pollen packets get stuck to the stigma as the bee is escaping, and after a while the orchid will produce a seed pod. According to Anthony Huxley, the fluid produced by the two glands which fill the bucket contain an intoxicating substance. These flowers are among the largest in the Orchid Family. According to Kupper and Linsenmaier some species can be up to 30 cm (12 in) wide and 16 cm (6 in) top to bottom. C. bruchmuelleri is generally regarded as the largest species, as even the unopened buds can be 11.7 cm (5 in) long by 8 centimetres (3 in) in width.

The bee, having stored the aromatic oils in his back legs, can then fly off to mate with a female bee.

== History ==
Some of the first investigations on Coryanthes were published by Cruger in 1865. Charles Darwin describes his observations and experiments on some species of Coryanthes in his book The Various Contrivances by which Orchids are Fertilized by Insects. However, Darwin thought it was the female bees that were doing the fertilizing, and it was almost 100 years before the role of the male euglossine bees were revealed in 1961.

== Intergeneric hybrids ==
- Coryhopea (Coryanthes × Stanhopea)

== Gallery ==
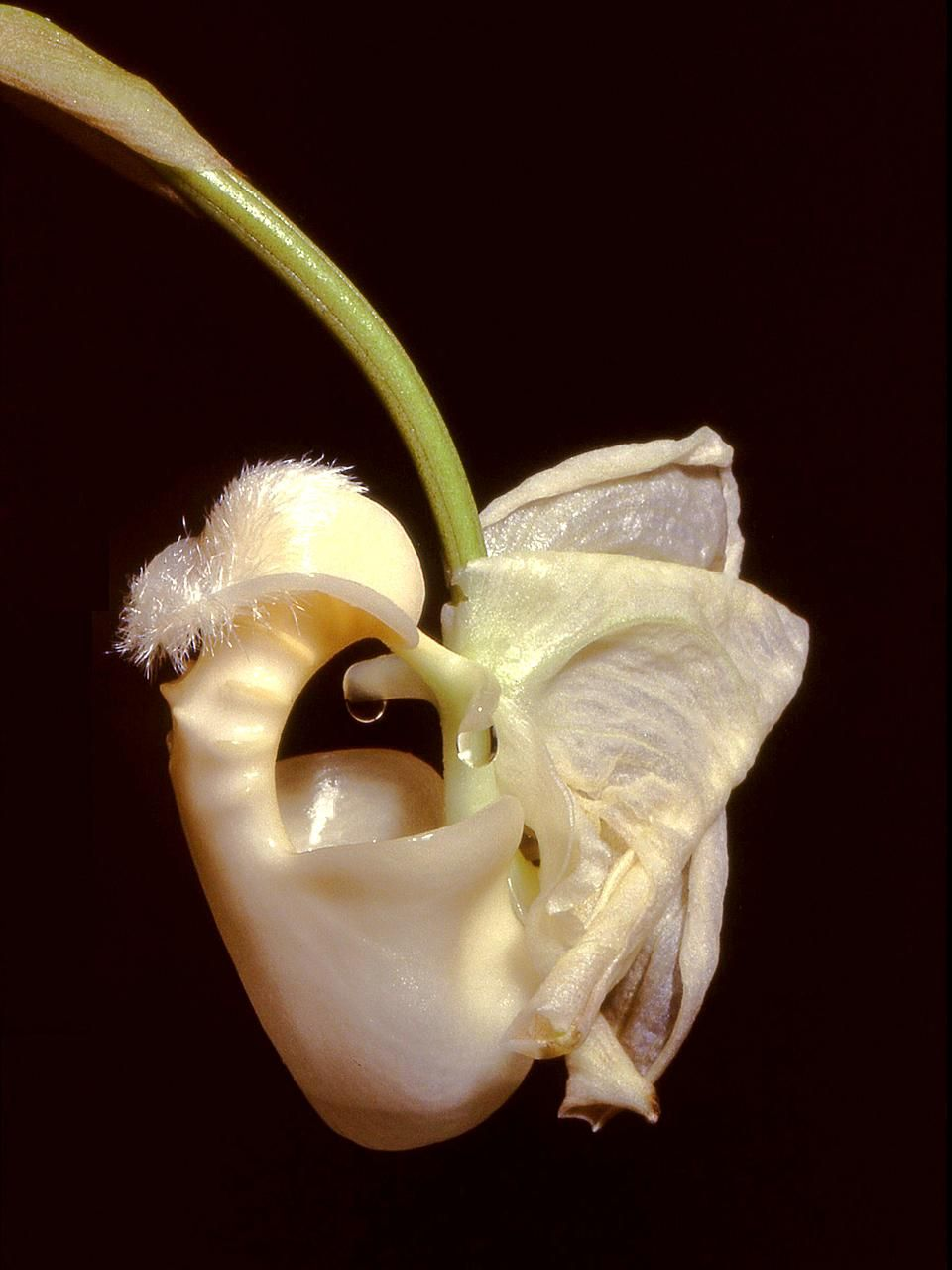
Coryanthes
alborosea

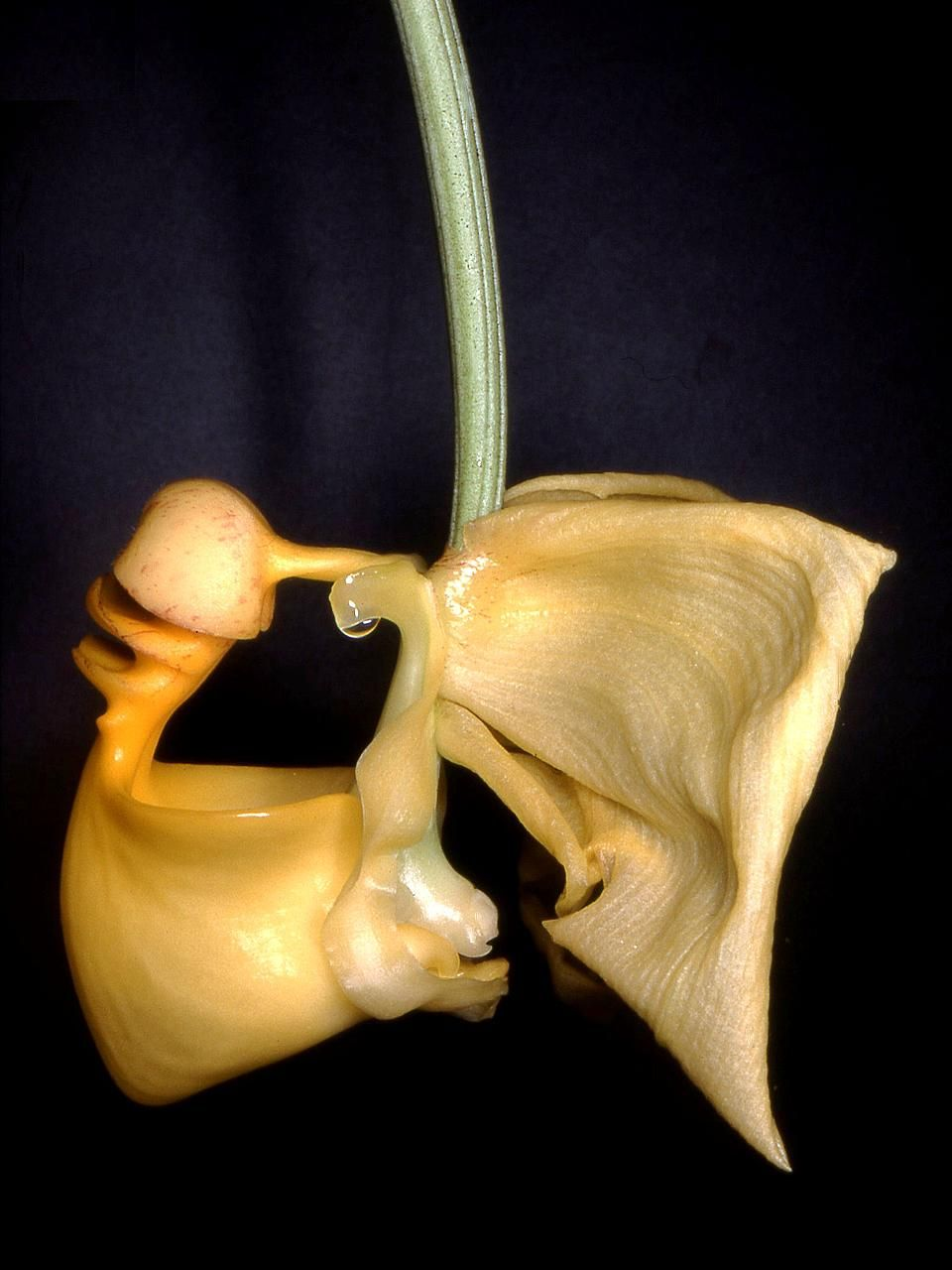
Coryanthes
gerlachiana

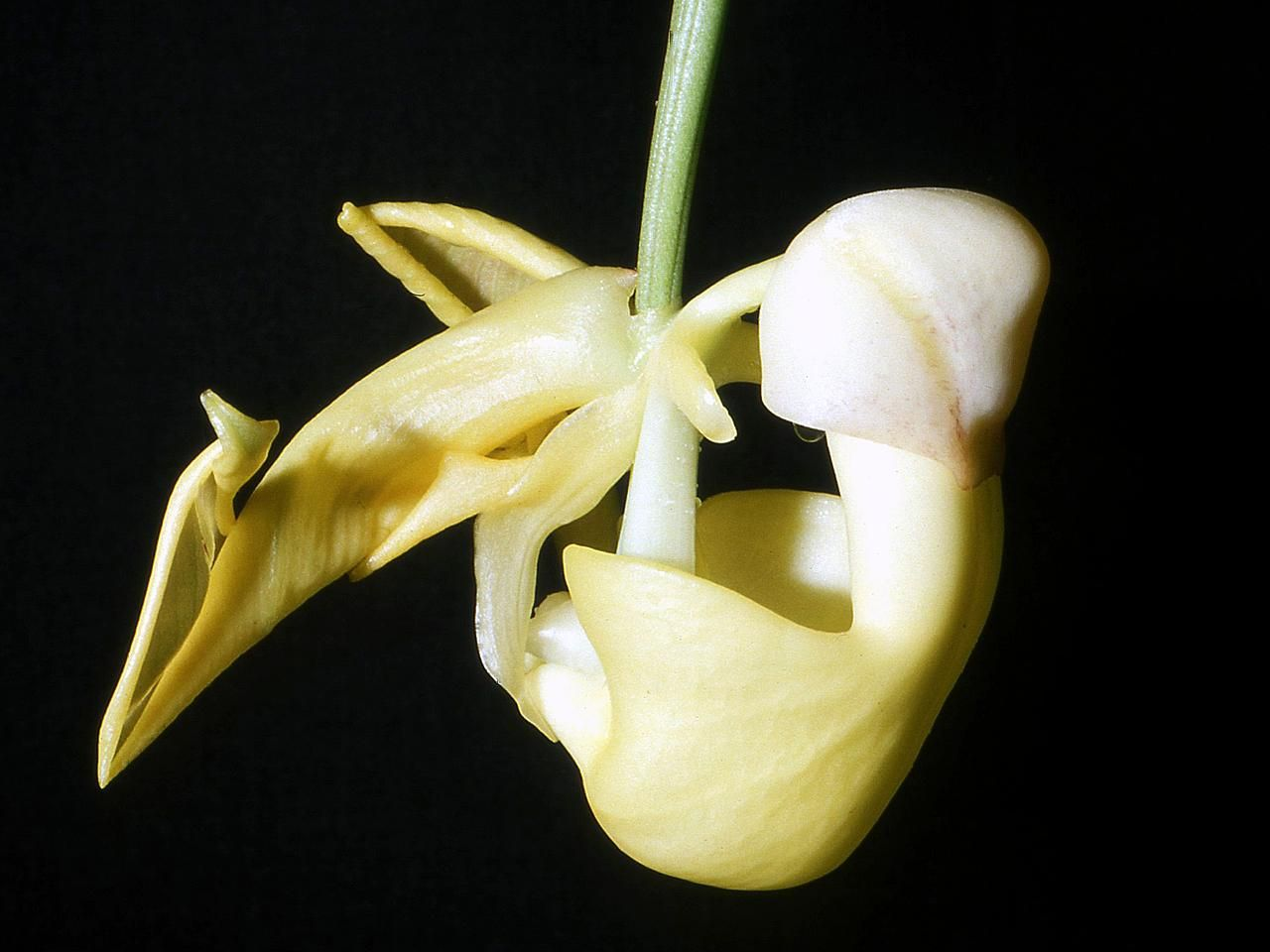
Coryanthes
hunteriana

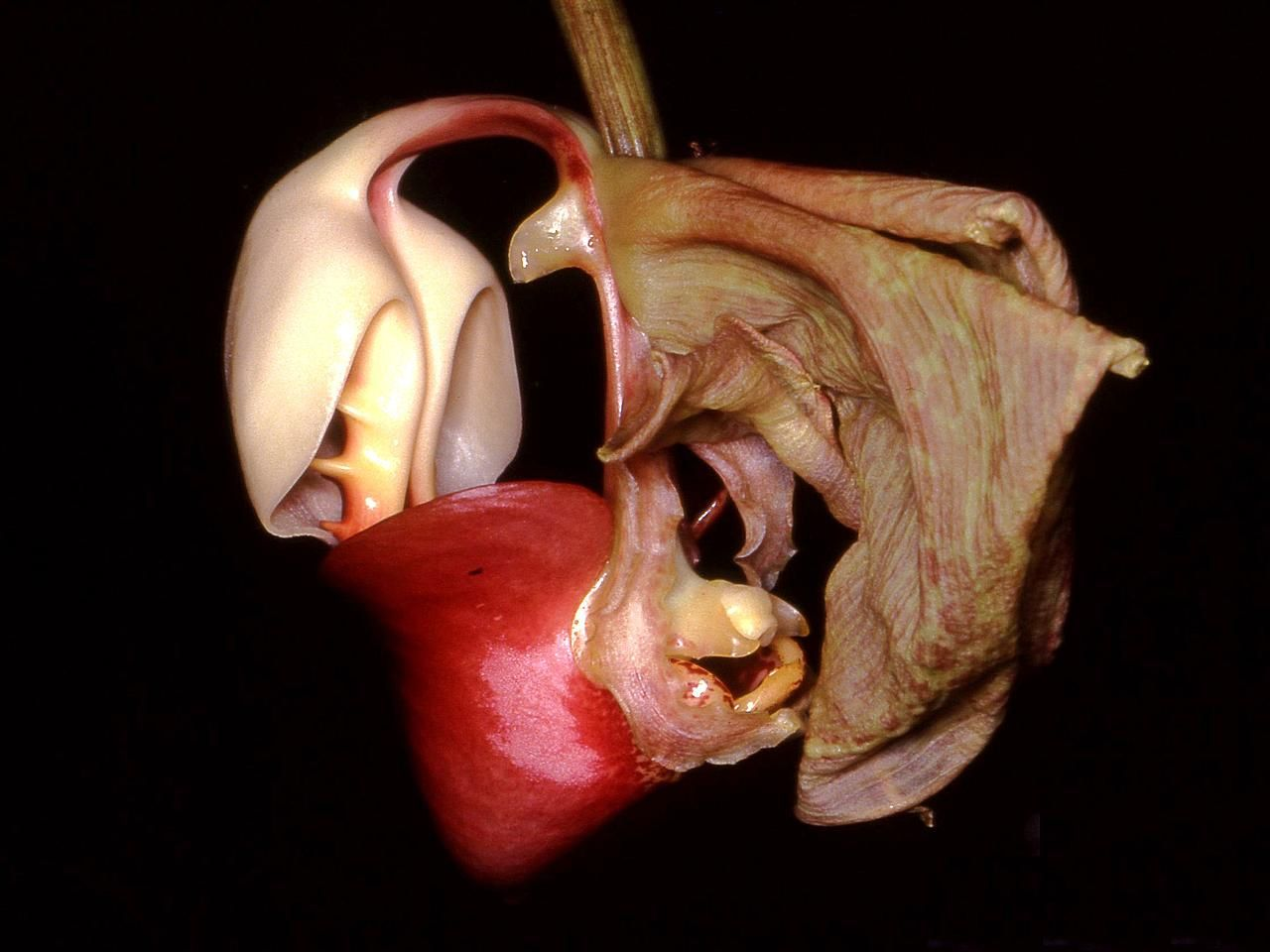
Coryanthes
leucocorys

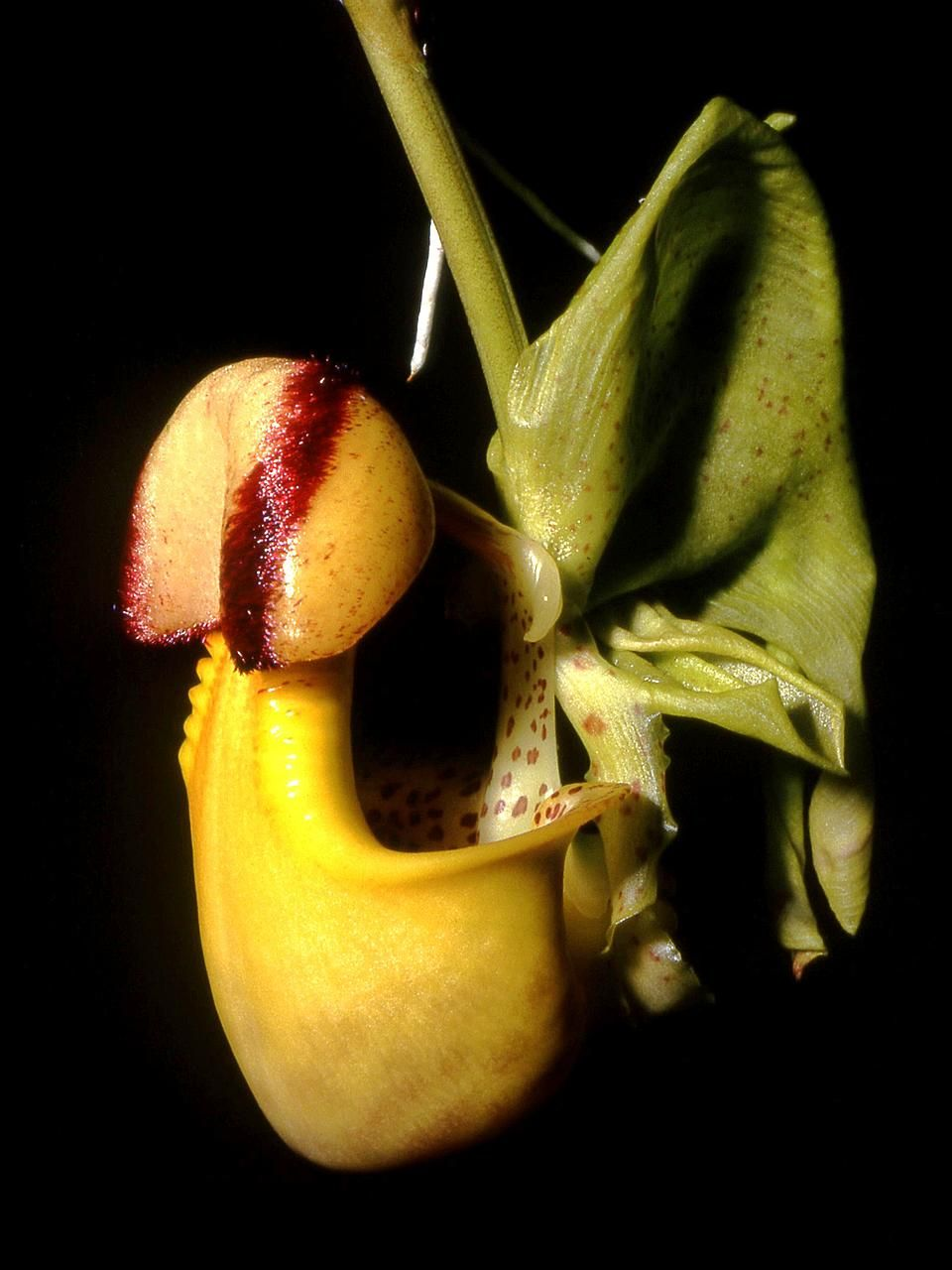
Coryanthes
verrucolineata

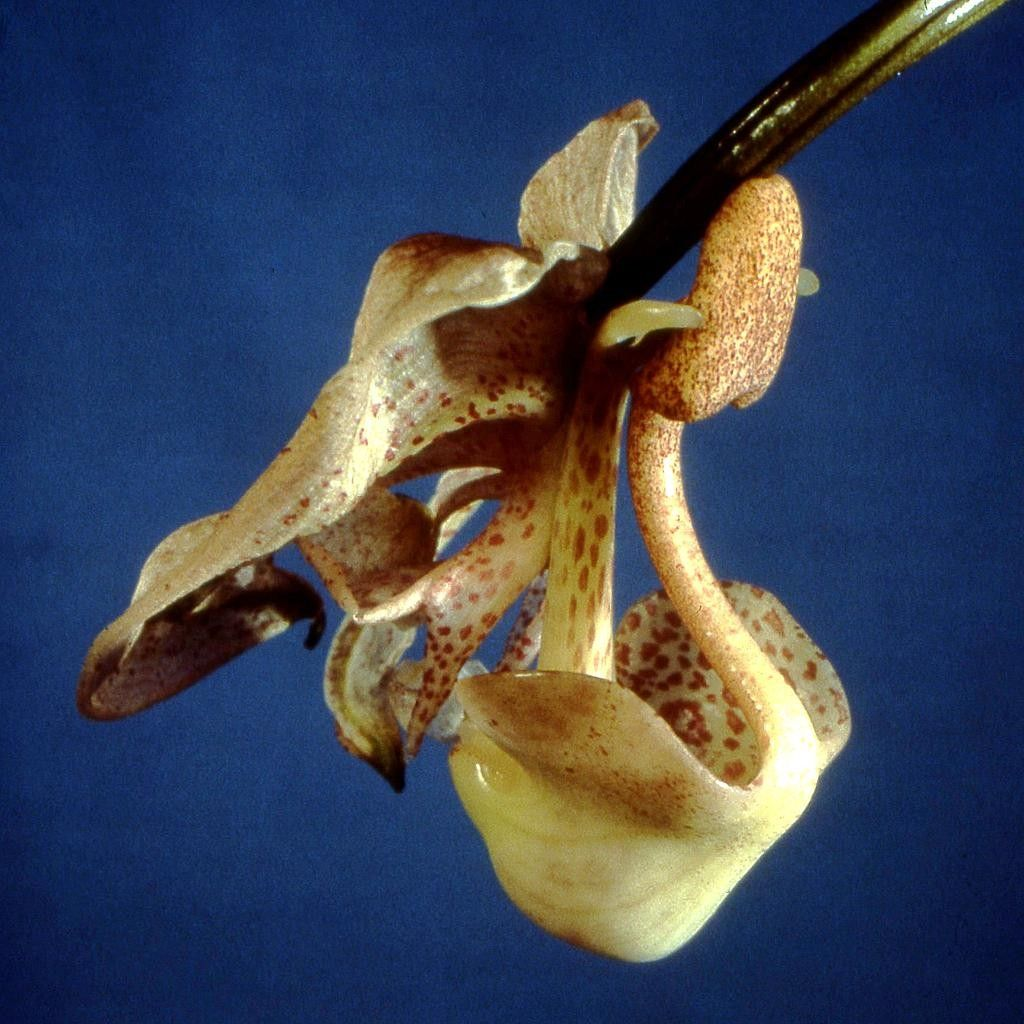
Coryanthes
macrocorys

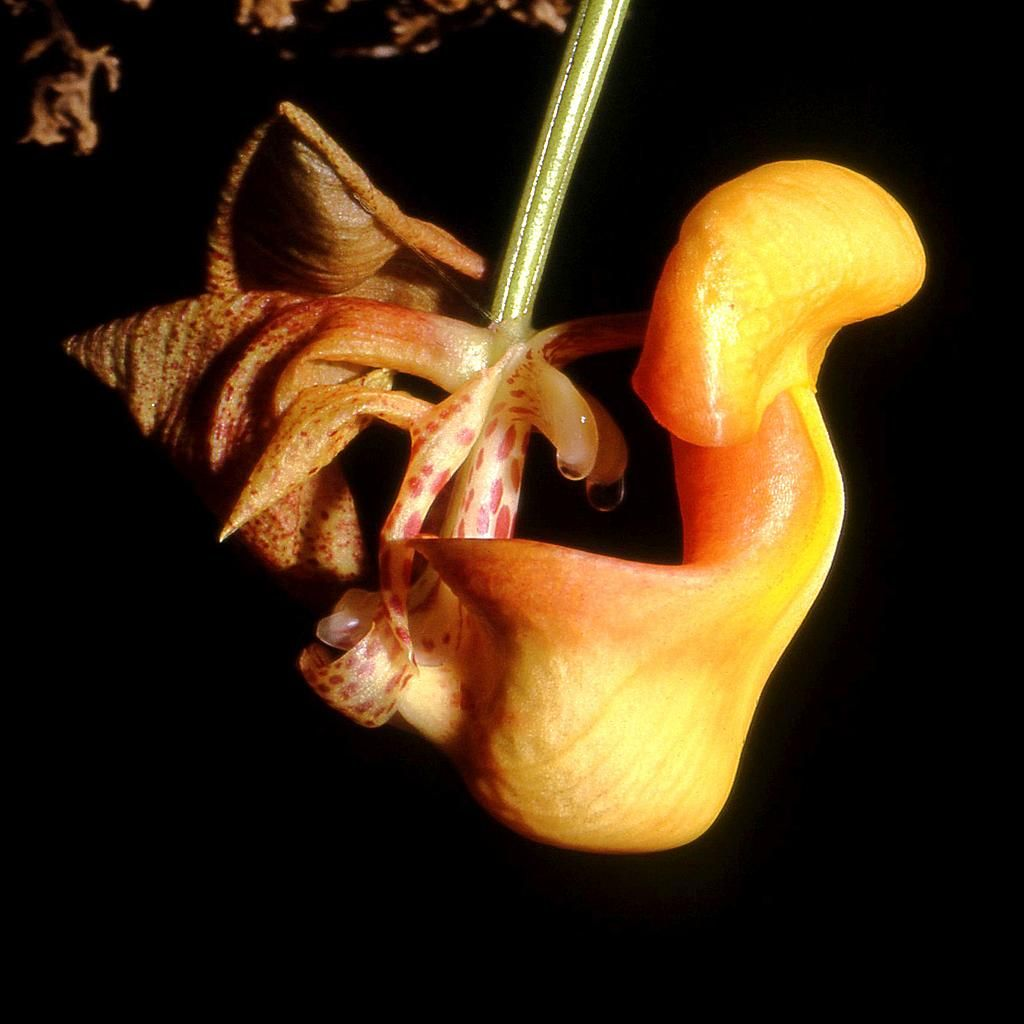
Coryanthes
maculata

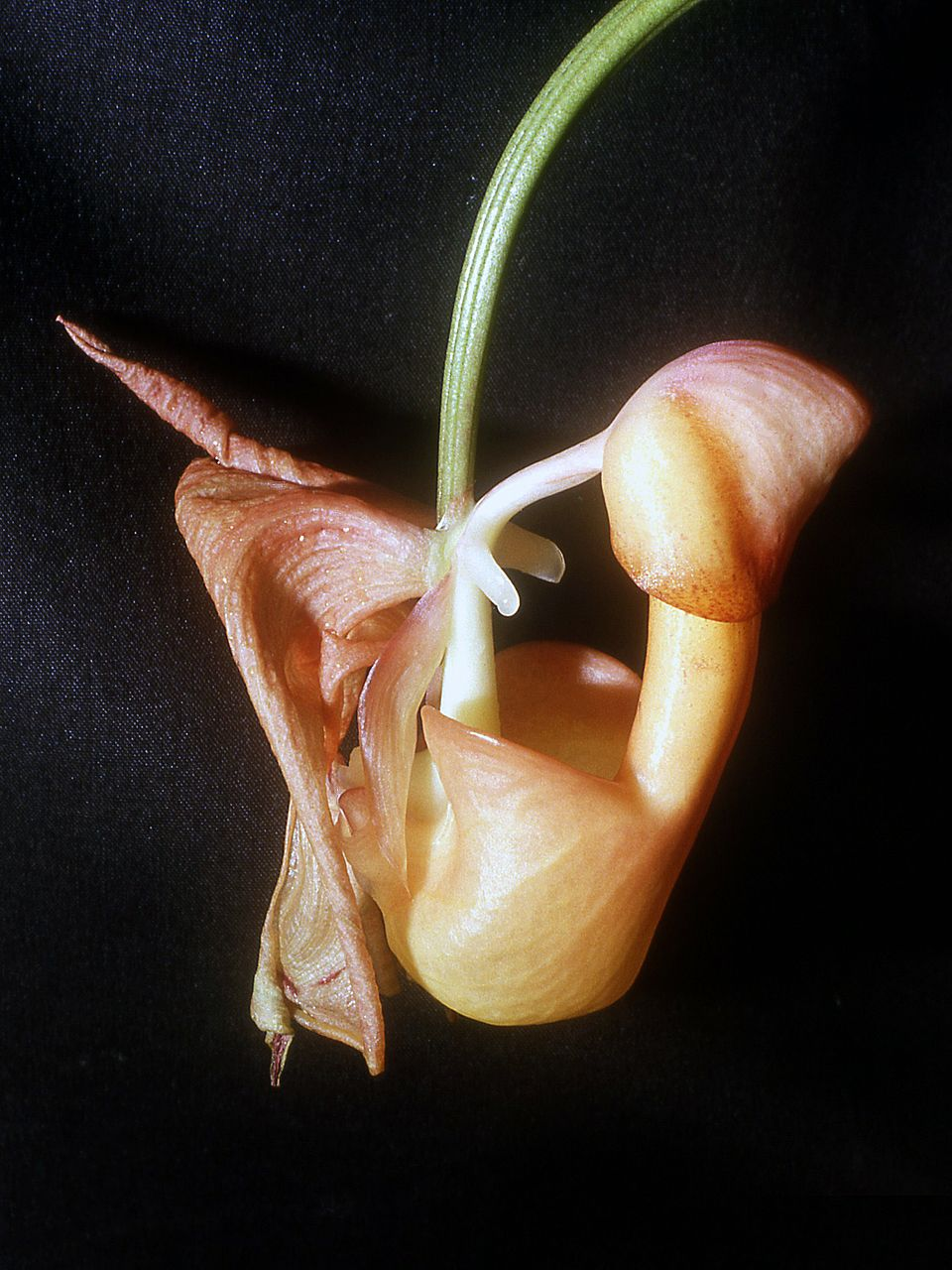
Coryanthes
mastersiana

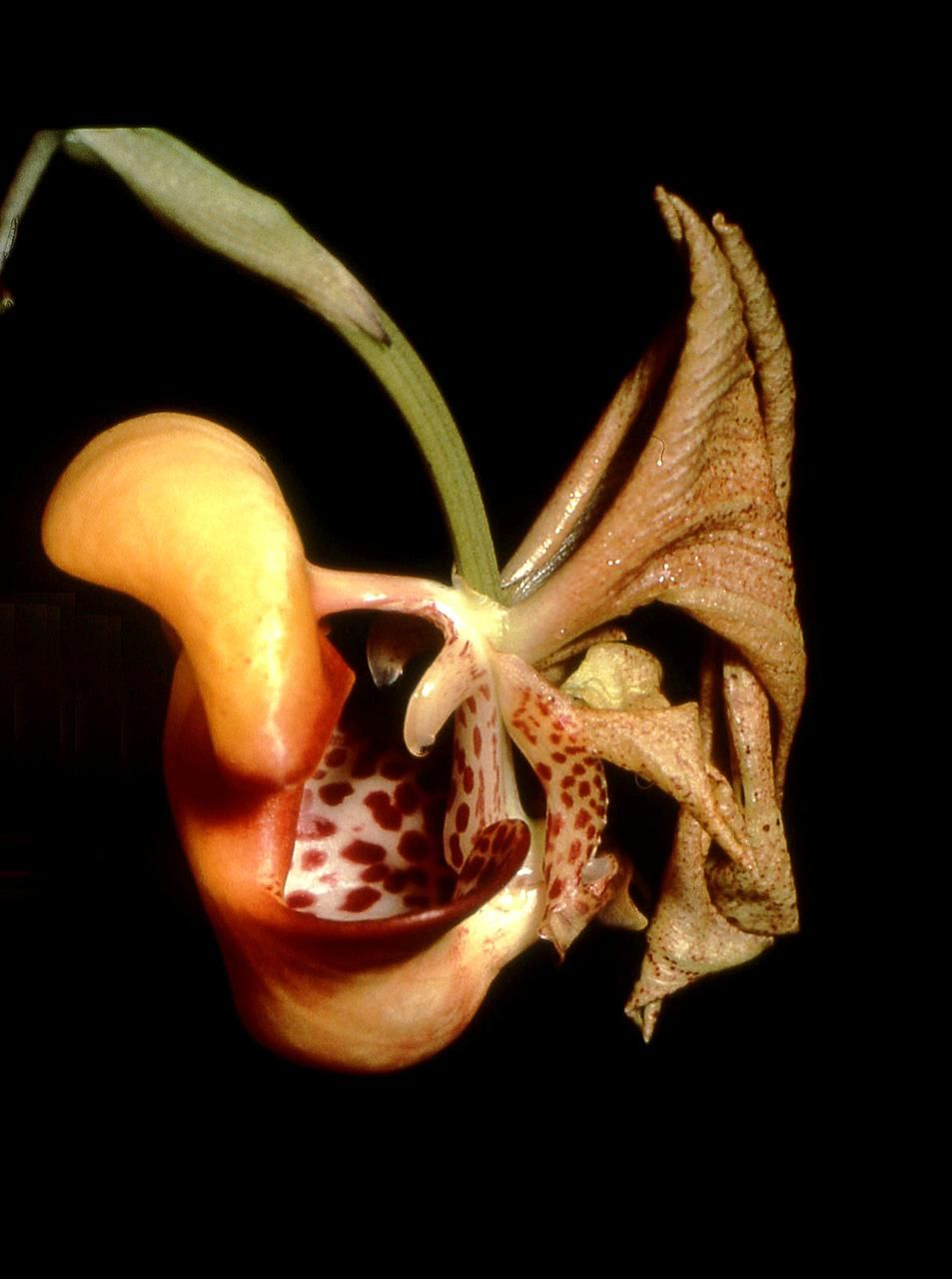
Coryanthes
picturata

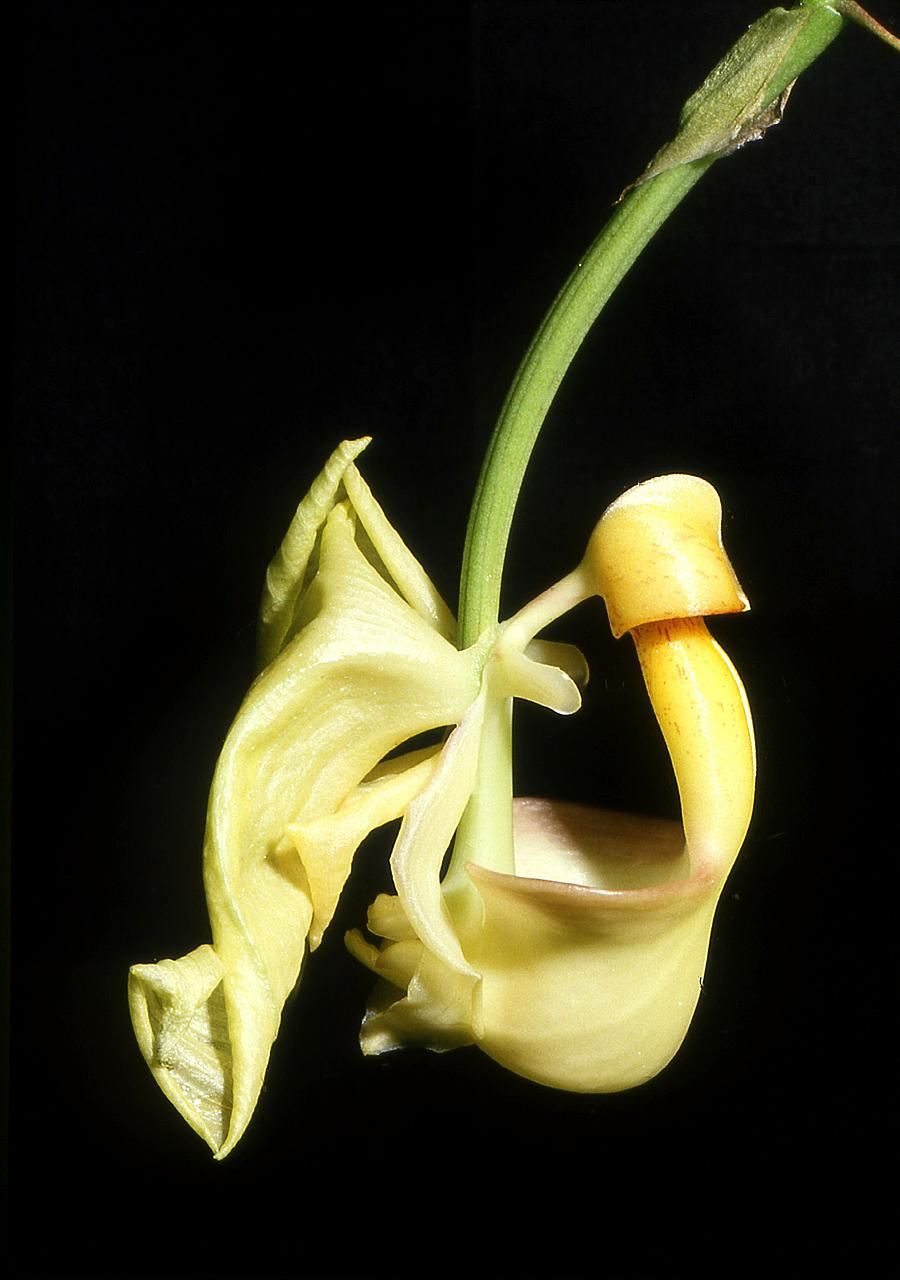
Coryanthes
speciosa

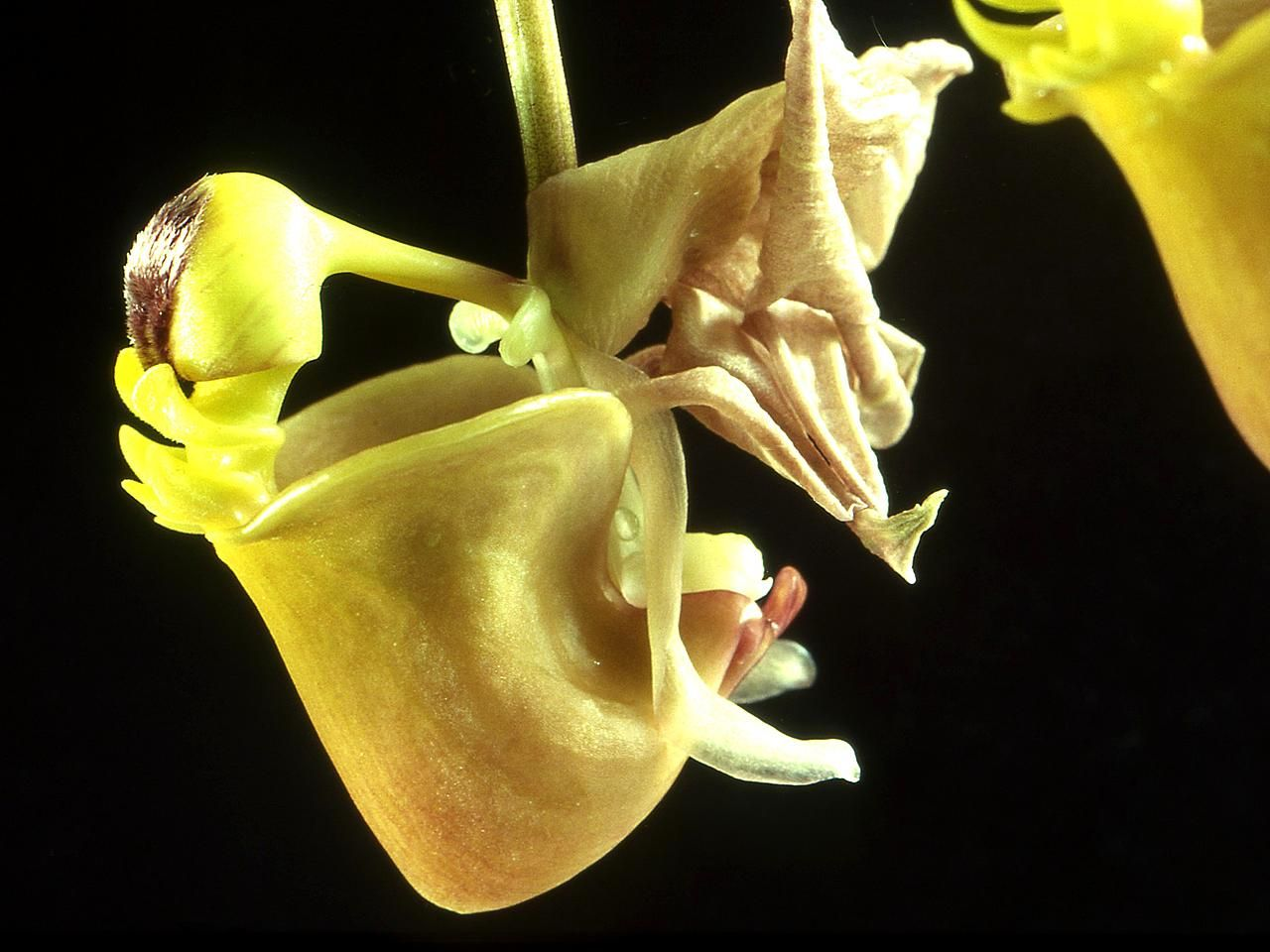
Coryanthes
trifoliata

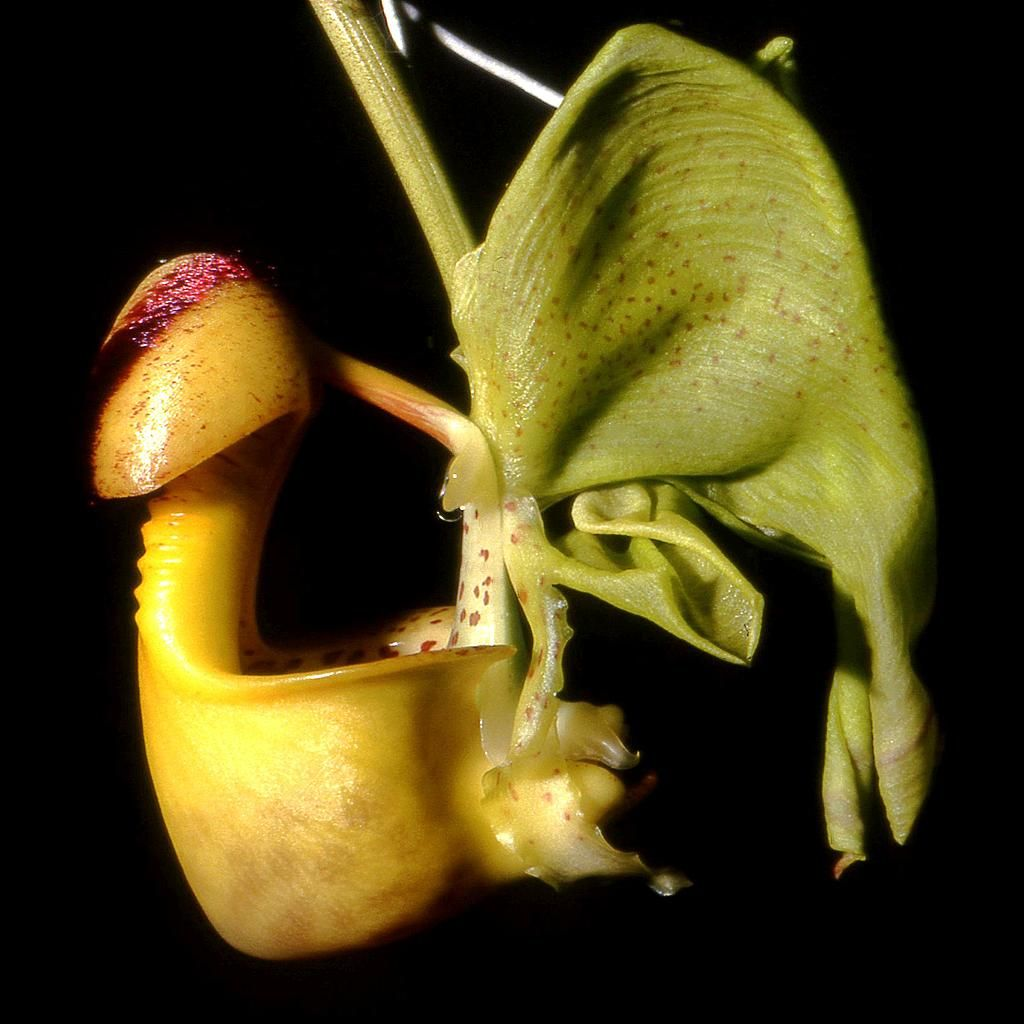
Coryanthes
verrucolineata

== See also ==
- Pollination of orchids
