= Rock pigeon (disambiguation) =

Rock pigeon may refer to:

- Petrophassa, an Australian genus of terrestrial pigeons
  - Chestnut-quilled rock pigeon (Petrophassa rufipennis)
  - White-quilled rock pigeon (Petrophassa albipennis)
- Rock dove (Columba livia), commonly called a rock pigeon, a Eurasian species introduced worldwide
- Speckled pigeon (Columba guinea), an African species
