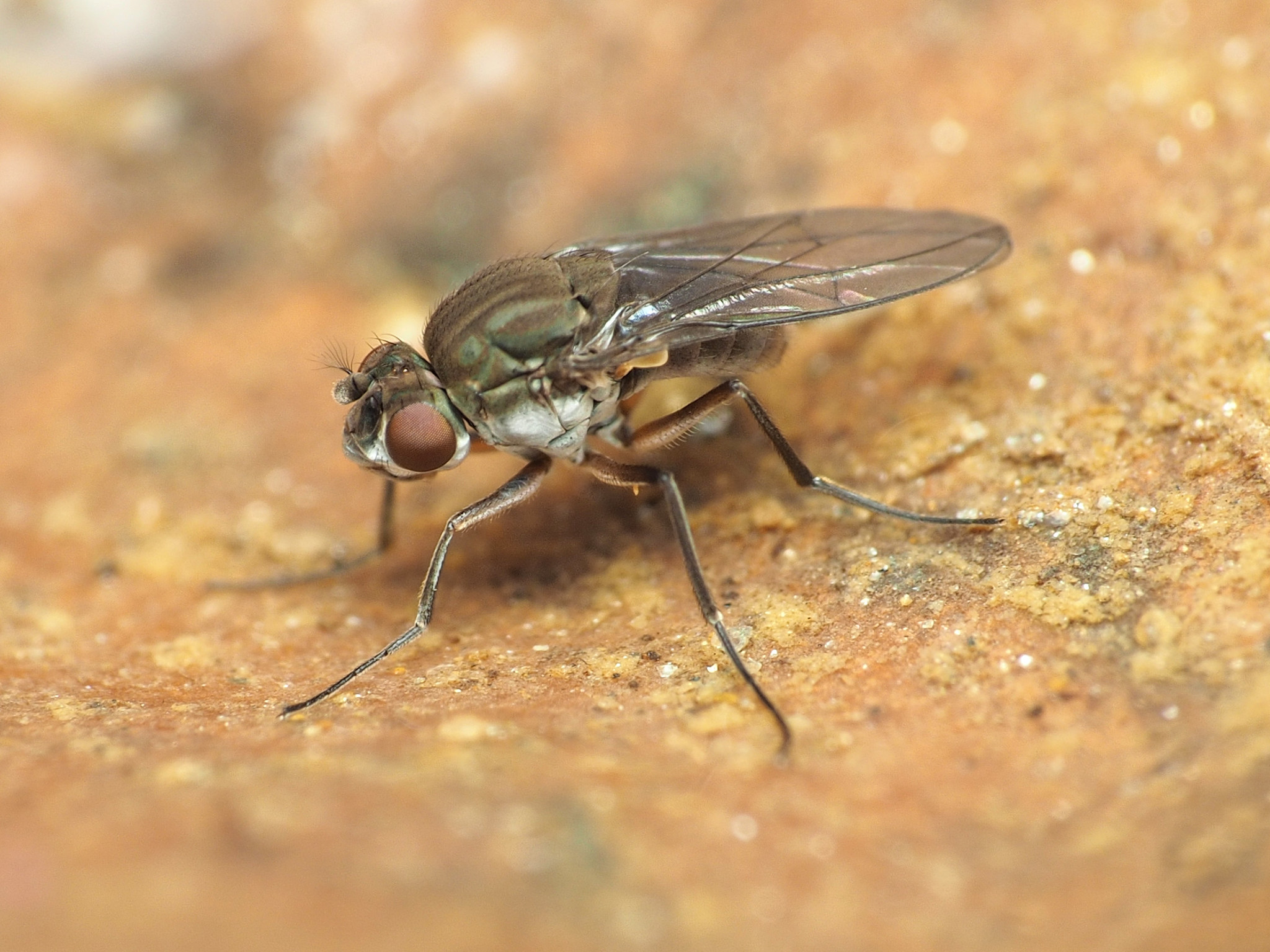

Scientific classification
- Kingdom: Animalia
- Phylum: Arthropoda
- Class: Insecta
- Order: Diptera
- Family: Ephydridae
- Subfamily: Ephydrinae
- Tribe: Scatellini
- Genus: Brachydeutera
- Species: B. argentata

Binomial name
- Brachydeutera argentata (Walker, 1852)

Synonyms
- Brachydeutera dimidiata Loew, 1862; Notiphila argentata Walker, 1852

= Brachydeutera argentata =

Species of fly

Brachydeutera argentata is a species of shore flies in the family Ephydridae found in the United States.
