= Cirrula gigantea =

Scientific classification
- Kingdom: Animalia
- Phylum: Arthropoda
- Class: Insecta
- Order: Diptera
- Family: Ephydridae
- Subfamily: Ephydrinae
- Tribe: Ephydrini
- Genus: Cirrula
- Species: C. gigantea

Binomial name
- Cirrula gigantea Cresson, 1915

Synonyms
- Pogonephydra chalybea Hendel, 1917

Species of fly

Cirrula gigantea is a species of shore flies in the family Ephydridae.

== Distribution ==
United States, Canada.
