= Coenia curvicauda =

Scientific classification
- Kingdom: Animalia
- Phylum: Arthropoda
- Class: Insecta
- Order: Diptera
- Family: Ephydridae
- Subfamily: Ephydrinae
- Tribe: Scatellini
- Genus: Coenia
- Species: C. curvicauda

Binomial name
- Coenia curvicauda (Meigen, 1830)

Synonyms
- Ephydra curvicauda Meigen, 1830

Species of fly

Coenia curvicauda is a species of shore fly in the family Ephydridae.

== Distribution ==
Canada, United States, Europe.
