= Cirrula austrina =

Scientific classification
- Kingdom: Animalia
- Phylum: Arthropoda
- Class: Insecta
- Order: Diptera
- Family: Ephydridae
- Subfamily: Ephydrinae
- Tribe: Ephydrini
- Genus: Cirrula
- Species: C. austrina

Binomial name
- Cirrula austrina (Coquillett, 1900)

Synonyms
- Coenia virida Hine, 1904; Ephydra austrina Coquillett, 1900

Species of fly

Cirrula austrina is a species of shore flies in the family Ephydridae.

== Distribution ==
United States, Mexico, Bermuda.
