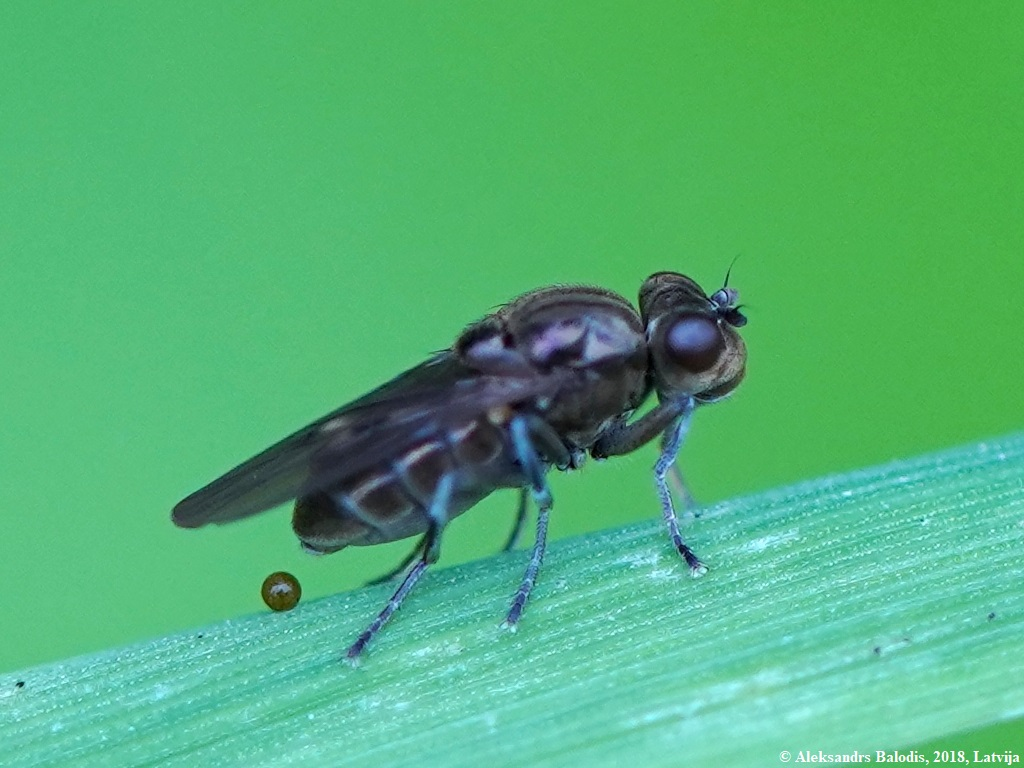

Scientific classification
- Kingdom: Animalia
- Phylum: Arthropoda
- Class: Insecta
- Order: Diptera
- Family: Ephydridae
- Genus: Parydra
- Species: P. aquila

Binomial name
- Parydra aquila (Fallen, 1813)

= Parydra aquila =

Species of fly

Parydra aquila is a species of fly in the family Ephydridae. It is found in the Palearctic. Jizz Face brilliant green-black. Tarsi red brown, never black. Long. : 3,5–5 mm. May to December. By ponds.
