= List of Scatella species =

This is a list of 144 species in the genus Scatella, shore flies in the family Ephydridae.

== Scatella species ==
- S. abbreviata Harrison, 1976^{c g}
- S. acutipennis Harrison, 1964^{c g}
- S. aeneiventris (Macquart, 1835)^{c g}
- S. albilutea Mathis & Wirth, 1981^{c g}
- S. alticeps Malloch, 1925^{c g}
- S. amnica (Tenorio, 1980)^{c g}
- S. angustipennis Wirth, 1955^{c g}
- S. apicalis Wirth, 1957^{c g}
- S. argentea Hendel, 1930^{c g}
- S. argentifacies Wirth, 1955^{c g}
- S. arizonensis Cresson, 1935^{i c g}
- S. atra (Malloch, 1933)^{c g}
- S. aurulenta Giordani Soika, 1956^{c g}
- S. australiae Malloch, 1925^{c g}
- S. australis Zatwarnicki & Irwin, 1853^{g}
- S. austrina Mathis & Wirth, 1981^{c g}
- S. balioptera (Mathis & Shewell, 1978)^{c}
- S. bicolor Mathis & Wirth, 1981^{c g}
- S. brachyptera Wirth, 1955^{c g}
- S. brevis Harrison, 1964^{c g}
- S. bronneci (Malloch, 1934)^{c g}
- S. brunnea Wirth, 1957^{c g}
- S. bryani Cresson, 1926^{c g}
- S. bullacosta Cresson, 1934^{c g}
- S. calida Matsumura, 1915^{c g}
- S. callosicosta Bezzi, 1895^{c g}
- S. catalogana Mathis & Zatwarnicki, 1995^{c g}
- S. cauta Cresson, 1931^{c g}
- S. cheesmanae (Malloch, 1934)^{c g}
- S. ciliata Collin, 1930^{c g}
- S. cilipes (Wirth, 1948)^{c g}
- S. cinerea Robineau-Desvoidy, 1830^{c g}
- S. cinereifacies (Tenorio, 1980)^{c g}
- S. clavipes (Wirth, 1948)^{c g}
- S. costalis Hendel, 1932^{c g}
- S. crassicosta Becker, 1896^{i c g}
- S. curtipennis (Becker, 1905)^{c g}
- S. decemguttata Wirth, 1955^{c g}
- S. discalis Wirth, 1955^{c g}
- S. ecuadorensis (Mathis, 1979)^{c g}
- S. edwardsi Cresson, 1931^{c g}
- S. favillacea Loew, 1862^{i c g}
- S. femoralis (Tenorio, 1980)^{c g}
- S. fernandezensis Wirth, 1955^{c g}
- S. fluvialis (Tenorio, 1980)^{c g}
- S. furens Cresson, 1931^{c g}
- S. fusca (Macquart, 1835)^{c g}
- S. fuscivenosa Wirth, 1957^{c g}
- S. galapagensis Curran, 1934^{c g}
- S. gea Canzoneri & Meneghini, 1979^{c g}
- S. gestiens Cresson, 1931^{c g}
- S. glabra (Mathis & Shewell, 1978)^{c g}
- S. gratiellae Canzoneri & Raffone, 1987^{c g}
- S. gregaria Cresson, 1931^{c g}
- S. guttata Zatwarnicki & Irwin, 2018^{g}
- S. guttipennis (Bigot, 1888)^{c g}
- S. hawaiiensis Grimshaw, 1901^{c g}
- S. henanensis Zhang & Yang, 2005^{c g}
- S. hirticrus (Mathis & Shewell, 1978)^{c g}
- S. ignara Cresson, 1931^{c g}
- S. immaculata Malloch, 1925^{c g}
- S. indistincta Becker, 1896^{c g}
- S. insularis Mathis & Wirth, 1981^{c g}
- S. irrorata (Macquart, 1835)^{c g}
- S. kauaiensis (Wirth, 1948)^{c g}
- S. kuscheli Wirth, 1955^{c g}
- S. lacustris Meigen, 1830^{g}
- S. lanicrus (Mathis & Shewell, 1978)^{c g}
- S. laxa Cresson, 1933^{i c g}
- S. lindbergi Dahl, 1959^{c g}
- S. lutea Wirth, 1955^{c g}
- S. lutosa (Haliday, 1833)^{c g}
- S. maculosa Canzoneri & Menghini, 1969^{c g}
- S. major Becker, 1908^{c g}
- S. marginalis Wirth, 1955^{c g}
- S. marinensis (Cresson, 1935)^{i c g}
- S. masatierrensis Wirth, 1955^{c g}
- S. mauiensis (Wirth, 1948)^{c g}
- S. megastoma (Zetterstedt, 1855)^{c g}
- S. melanderi (Cresson, 1935)^{i c g}
- S. minima Wirth, 1955^{c g}
- S. nanoptera Wirth, 1955^{c g}
- S. neglecta (Lamb, 1917)^{c g}
- S. nelsoni Tonnoir & Malloch, 1926^{c g}
- S. nipponica Miyagi, 1977^{c g}
- S. nitidithorax Malloch, 1925^{c g}
- S. norrisi Mathis & Wirth, 1981^{c g}
- S. notabilis Cresson, 1934^{c g}
- S. nubeculosa Tonnoir & Malloch, 1926^{c g}
- S. oahuense Williams, 1938^{c g}
- S. obscura Williston, 1896^{i c g}
- S. obscurella Hendel, 1930^{c g}
- S. obscuriceps Cresson, 1915^{i c g}
- S. obsoleta Loew, 1861^{i c g}
- S. pallida Wirth, 1955^{c g}
- S. paludum (Meigen, 1830)^{i c g}
- S. penai (Mathis & Shewell, 1978)^{c}
- S. pentastigma (Thomson, 1869)^{i c g}
- S. picea (Walker, 1849)^{i c g b}
- S. pilifera Cresson, 1931^{c g}
- S. pilimana Wirth, 1955^{c g}
- S. pruinosa Dahl, 1961^{c g}
- S. pulla Cresson, 1931^{c g}
- S. quadrinotata Cresson, 1933^{i c g}
- S. rivalis Miyagi, 1977^{c g}
- S. rufipes Strobl, 1906^{c g}
- S. sanctipauli Schiner, 1868^{c g}
- S. savegre Mathis & Zumbado, 2005^{c g}
- S. semicinerea (Mathis & Shewell, 1978)^{c g}
- S. semipolita (Mathis & Shewell, 1978)^{c g}
- S. septemfenestrata Lamb, 1912^{c g}
- S. septempunctata Malloch, 1933^{c g}
- S. setosa Coquillett, 1900^{i c g}
- S. sexnotata Cresson, 1926^{c g}
- S. sexpunctata Malloch, 1933^{c g}
- S. shewelli Mathis & Zartwarnicki, 1995^{c g}
- S. silacea Loew, 1860^{c g}
- S. skottsbergi Wirth, 1957^{c g}
- S. spangleri (Mathis, 1979)^{c g}
- S. spinicrus (Mathis & Shewell, 1978)^{c g}
- S. stagnalis (Fallén, 1813)^{i c g}
- S. stenoptera Wirth, 1955^{c g}
- S. stuckenbergi (Wirth, 1956)
- S. sturdeeanus (Lamb, 1917)^{c g}
- S. subguttata (Meigen, 1830)^{c g}
- S. subvittata Tonnoir & Malloch, 1926^{c g}
- S. tasmaniae Mathis & Wirth, 1981^{c g}
- S. tenuicosta Collin, 1930^{c g}
- S. terryi Cresson, 1926^{c g}
- S. thermarum Collin, 1930^{i c g}
- S. tonnoiri Hendel, 1931^{c g}
- S. triseta Coquillett, 1902^{i c g}
- S. troi Cresson, 1933^{i c g}
- S. unguiculata Tonnoir & Malloch, 1926^{c g}
- S. unguiculosa (Mathis, 1934)^{c g}
- S. variofemorata Becker, 1903^{c g}
- S. varipennis Malloch, 1933^{c g}
- S. victoria (Cresson, 1935)^{c}
- S. vittata Wirth, 1955^{c g}
- S. vittithorax Malloch, 1925^{c g}
- S. vulgata Cresson, 1931^{c g}
- S. warreni Cresson, 1926^{c g}
- S. williamsi (Wirth, 1948)^{c g}
- S. wirthi Hardy, 1965^{i c g}

Data sources: i = ITIS, c = Catalogue of Life, g = GBIF, b = Bugguide.net
