= Setacera atrovirens =

Scientific classification
- Kingdom: Animalia
- Phylum: Arthropoda
- Class: Insecta
- Order: Diptera
- Family: Ephydridae
- Subfamily: Ephydrinae
- Tribe: Ephydrini
- Genus: Setacera
- Species: S. atrovirens

Binomial name
- Setacera atrovirens (Loew, 1862)

Synonyms
- Ephydra atrovirens Loew, 1862

Species of fly

Setacera atrovirens is a species of shore flies in the family Ephydridae.

== Distribution ==
Canada, United States.
