= Limnellia quadrata =

- Video

Scientific classification
- Kingdom: Animalia
- Phylum: Arthropoda
- Class: Insecta
- Order: Diptera
- Family: Ephydridae
- Subfamily: Ephydrinae
- Tribe: Scatellini
- Genus: Limnellia
- Species: L. quadrata

Binomial name
- Limnellia quadrata (Fallen, 1813)

Synonyms
- Ephydra graminum Haliday, 1833; Notiphila quadrata Fallen, 1813

Species of fly

Limnellia quadrata is a species of fly in the family Ephydridae. It is found in the Palearctic. It is 2 or 3 mm long and has distinctively patterned wings. It is found in meadows.
