= Setacera pilicornis =

Scientific classification
- Kingdom: Animalia
- Phylum: Arthropoda
- Class: Insecta
- Order: Diptera
- Family: Ephydridae
- Subfamily: Ephydrinae
- Tribe: Ephydrini
- Genus: Setacera
- Species: S. pilicornis

Binomial name
- Setacera pilicornis Coquillett, 1902

Synonyms
- Ephydra pilicornis Coquillett, 1902; Setacera knabi Cresson, 1935

Species of fly

Setacera pilicornis is a species of shore flies in the family Ephydridae.

== Distribution ==
United States, Mexico.
