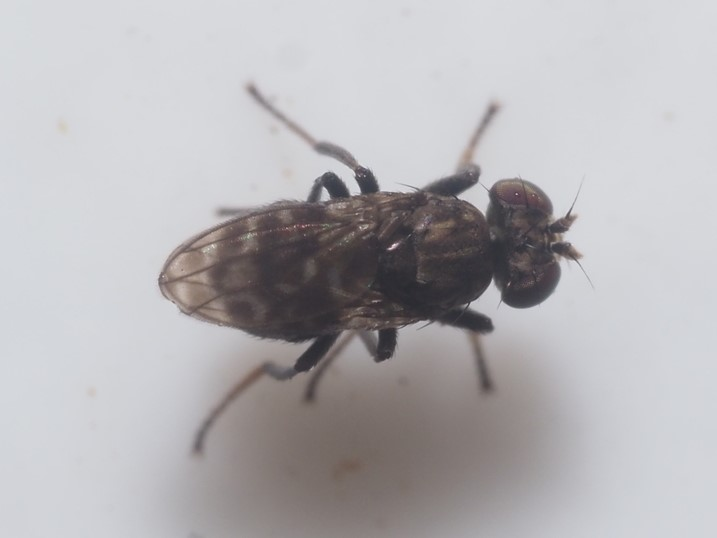

Scientific classification
- Kingdom: Animalia
- Phylum: Arthropoda
- Class: Insecta
- Order: Diptera
- Family: Ephydridae
- Subfamily: Ephydrinae
- Tribe: Scatellini
- Genus: Limnellia
- Species: L. fallax

Binomial name
- Limnellia fallax (Czerny, 1903)

Synonyms
- Scatella fallax Czerny, 1903

= Limnellia fallax =

Species of fly

Limnellia fallax is a species of fly in the family Ephydridae. It is found in the Palearctic.

== Distribution ==
Austria, Czech Republic, Finland, Germany, Hungary, Poland.
