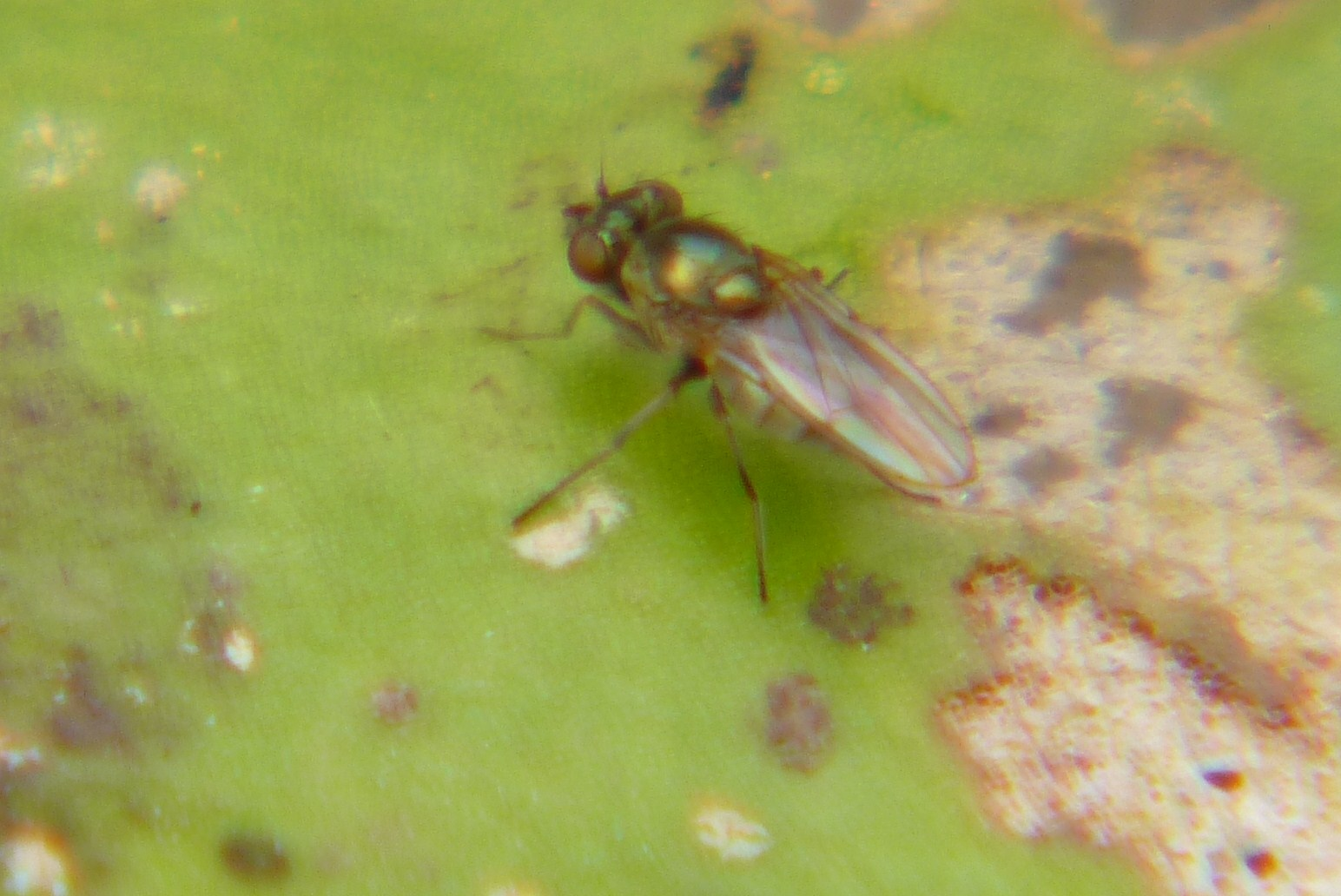
- Setacera breviventris

Scientific classification
- Kingdom: Animalia
- Phylum: Arthropoda
- Class: Insecta
- Order: Diptera
- Family: Ephydridae
- Subfamily: Ephydrinae
- Tribe: Ephydrini
- Genus: Setacera
- Species: S. breviventris

Binomial name
- Setacera breviventris (Loew, 1860)

Synonyms
- Ephydra breviventris Loew, 1860; Ephydra laeta Hendel, 1913; Ephydra glabra Meijere, 1916; Setacera pedalis Cresson, 1930; Setacera fluxa Miyagi, 1966

= Setacera breviventris =

Species of fly

Setacera breviventris is a species of shore flies in the family Ephydridae.

== Distribution ==
Angola, Kenya, Nigeria, Australia, Guam, Solomon Islands, Bangladesh.
