= Brachydeutera longipes =

Scientific classification
- Kingdom: Animalia
- Phylum: Arthropoda
- Class: Insecta
- Order: Diptera
- Family: Ephydridae
- Subfamily: Ephydrinae
- Tribe: Scatellini
- Genus: Brachydeutera
- Species: B. longipes

Binomial name
- Brachydeutera longipes Hendel, 1913

Species of fly

Brachydeutera longipes is a species of shore flies in the family Ephydridae.

== Distribution ==
It is found in Canada, the United States, and Asia.
