= Limnellia surtsuri =

Scientific classification
- Kingdom: Animalia
- Phylum: Arthropoda
- Class: Insecta
- Order: Diptera
- Family: Ephydridae
- Subfamily: Ephydrinae
- Tribe: Scatellini
- Genus: Limnellia
- Species: L. surtsuri

Binomial name
- Limnellia surtsuri Andersson, 1971

Species of fly

Limnellia surtsuri is a species of fly in the family Ephydridae.

== Distribution ==
Great Britain, Iceland.
