= Limnellia anna =

Scientific classification
- Kingdom: Animalia
- Phylum: Arthropoda
- Class: Insecta
- Order: Diptera
- Family: Ephydridae
- Subfamily: Ephydrinae
- Tribe: Scatellini
- Genus: Limnellia
- Species: L. anna

Binomial name
- Limnellia anna Cresson, 1935

Species of fly

Limnellia anna is a species of shore flies in the family Ephydridae.

== Distribution ==
Canada, United States.
