= Scatella picea =

Scientific classification
- Kingdom: Animalia
- Phylum: Arthropoda
- Class: Insecta
- Order: Diptera
- Family: Ephydridae
- Genus: Scatella
- Species: S. picea

Binomial name
- Scatella picea (Walker, 1849)

Synonyms
- Ephydra picea Walker, 1849; Scatella lugens Loew, 1862

Species of fly

Scatella picea is a species of shore flies (insects in the family Ephydridae).
