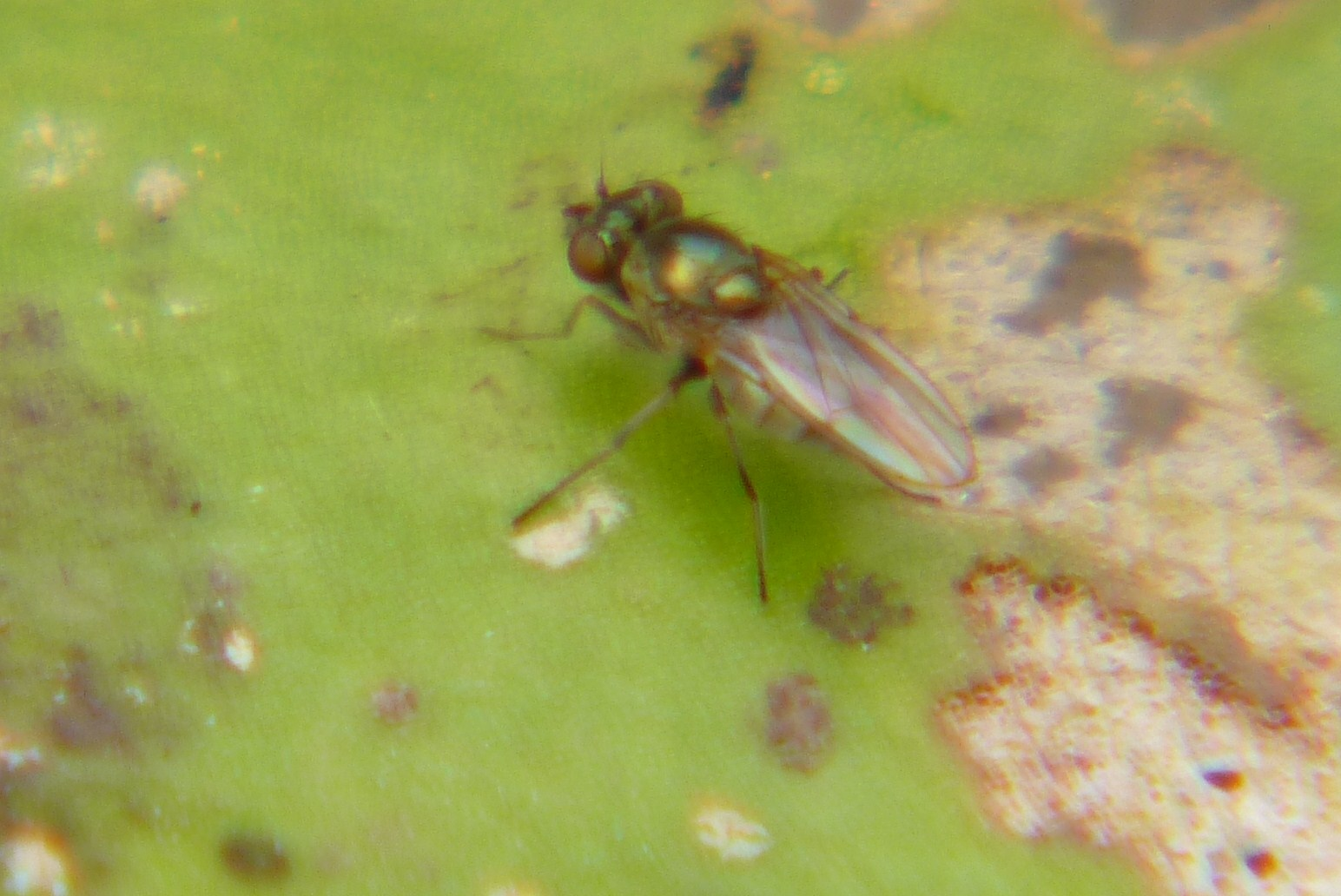
- Setacera breviventris

Scientific classification
- Kingdom: Animalia
- Phylum: Arthropoda
- Class: Insecta
- Order: Diptera
- Family: Ephydridae
- Subfamily: Ephydrinae
- Tribe: Ephydrini
- Genus: Setacera; Cresson, 1930

Type species
- Setacera pacifica Cresson, 1925

= Setacera =

Genus of flies

Setacera is a genus of shore flies in the family Ephydridae.

== Species ==
- S. aldrichi Cresson, 1935
- S. atrovirens (Loew, 1862)
- S. aurata (Stenhammar, 1844)
- S. breviventris (Loew, 1860)
- S. durani Cresson, 1935
- S. freidbergi Mathis, 1982
- S. jamesi Mathis, 1982
- S. micans (Haliday, 1833)
- S. multicolor (Giordani Soika, 1956)
- S. needhami Johannsen, 1935
- S. pacifica (Cresson, 1925)
- S. pilicornis Coquillett, 1902
- S. trichoscelis Mathis, 1982
- S. trina Collin, 1963
- S. viridis Miyagi, 1966
