= Parydra quadrituberculata =

Scientific classification
- Domain: Eukaryota
- Kingdom: Animalia
- Phylum: Arthropoda
- Class: Insecta
- Order: Diptera
- Family: Ephydridae
- Genus: Parydra
- Species: P. quadrituberculata

Binomial name
- Parydra quadrituberculata Loew, 1862

Species of fly

Parydra quadrituberculata is a species of shore flies in the family Ephydridae.
