= Parydra =

Scientific classification
- Domain: Eukaryota
- Kingdom: Animalia
- Phylum: Arthropoda
- Class: Insecta
- Order: Diptera
- Family: Ephydridae
- Subfamily: Ephydrinae
- Tribe: Parydrini
- Genus: Parydra; Stenhammar, 1844

Genus of flies

Parydra is a genus of shore flies in the family Ephydridae. There are at least 70 described species in Parydra.

== Species ==
These 76 species belong to the genus Parydra:

- P. abbreviata Loew, 1861^{i c g}
- P. acuta Clausen and Cook, 1971^{i c g}
- P. alajensis Krivosheina, 1989^{c g}
- P. albipulvis Miyagi, 1977^{c g}
- P. alpina (Cresson, 1924)^{i c g}
- P. appendiculata Loew, 1878^{i c g}
- P. aquila (Fallén, 1813)^{i c g b}
- P. arctica Clausen and Cook, 1971^{i c g}
- P. articulata Canzoneri & Meneghini, 1981^{c g}
- P. aurata Jones, 1906^{i c g}
- P. aureola Cresson, 1931^{c g}
- P. borealis (Cresson, 1949)^{i c g}
- P. breviceps Loew, 1862^{i c g}
- P. buccata Becker, 1914^{c g}
- P. bucculenta Loew, 1862^{c g}
- P. cishumilis Clausen, 1985^{c g}
- P. coarctata (Fallén, 1813)^{c g}
- P. cognata Loew, 1860^{c g}
- P. copis Clausen and Cook, 1971^{i c g}
- P. flavitarsis (Dahl, 1964)^{c g}
- P. formosana Cresson, 1937^{c g}
- P. fossarum (Haliday, 1833)^{c g}
- P. halteralis (Cresson, 1930)^{i c g}
- P. hamata Clausen and Cook, 1971^{i c g}
- P. hecate (Haliday, 1833)^{c g}
- P. humilis Williston, 1897^{i c g}
- P. imitans Loew, 1878^{i c g}
- P. incommoda Cresson, 1930^{i c g}
- P. inornata Becker, 1924^{c g}
- P. japonica Miyagi, 1977^{c g}
- P. joaquinensis Clausen & Cook, 1971^{c g}
- P. lingulata Clausen and Cook, 1971^{i c g}
- P. littoralis (Meigen, 1830)^{c g}
- P. lutumilis Miyagi, 1977^{c g}
- P. lynetteae Clausen & Cook, 1971^{c g}
- P. mitis (Cresson, 1930)^{c g}
- P. neozelandica Tonnoir & Malloch, 1926^{c g}
- P. nigripes (Cresson, 1918)^{c g}
- P. nigritarsis Strobl, 1893^{c g}
- P. nubecula Becker, 1896^{c g}
- P. ochropus (Thomson, 1869)^{c g}
- P. ozerovi Krivosheina, 1989^{c g}
- P. pacifica Miyagi, 1977^{c g}
- P. parasocia Clausen and Cook, 1971^{i c g}
- P. parva Cresson, 1949^{i c g}
- P. paullula Loew, 1862^{i c g}
- P. pedalis Clausen and Cook, 1971^{i c g}
- P. penabbreviata Clausen and Cook, 1971^{i c g}
- P. penisica Clausen and Cook, 1971^{i c g}
- P. pinguis (Walker, 1852)^{i c g}
- P. pubera Loew, 1860^{c g}
- P. pulvisa Miyagi, 1977^{c g}
- P. pusilla (Meigen, 1830)^{c g}
- P. quadriloba Clausen and Cook, 1971^{i c g}
- P. quadripunctata (Meigen, 1830)^{c g}
- P. quadrituberculata Loew, 1862^{i c g b}
- P. quinquemaculata Becker, 1896^{c g}
- P. raffonei Canzoneri, 1986^{c g}
- P. ralloi Canzoneri & Meneghini, 1978^{c g}
- P. socia (Cresson, 1934)^{i c g}
- P. spiculosa Clausen, 1985^{c g}
- P. spinosa Clausen and Cook, 1971^{i c g}
- P. stagnicola Robineau-Desvoidy, 1830^{c g}
- P. succurva Clausen and Cook, 1971^{i c g}
- P. taurrensis Canzoneri, 1980^{c g}
- P. transversa Cresson, 1940^{i c g}
- P. truncatula Clausen, 1985^{c g}
- P. tuberculifera Lamb, 1912^{c g}
- P. turkmenica Krivosheina, 1989^{c g}
- P. undulata Becker, 1896^{c g}
- P. unicolor (Becker, 1926)^{c g}
- P. unituberculata Loew, 1878^{i c g}
- P. vanduzeei (Cresson, 1933)^{i c g}
- P. varia Loew, 1863^{i c g}
- P. villosissima Giordani Soika, 1956^{c g}
- P. vulgaris (Cresson, 1949)^{i c g}

Data sources: i = ITIS, c = Catalogue of Life, g = GBIF, b = Bugguide.net
