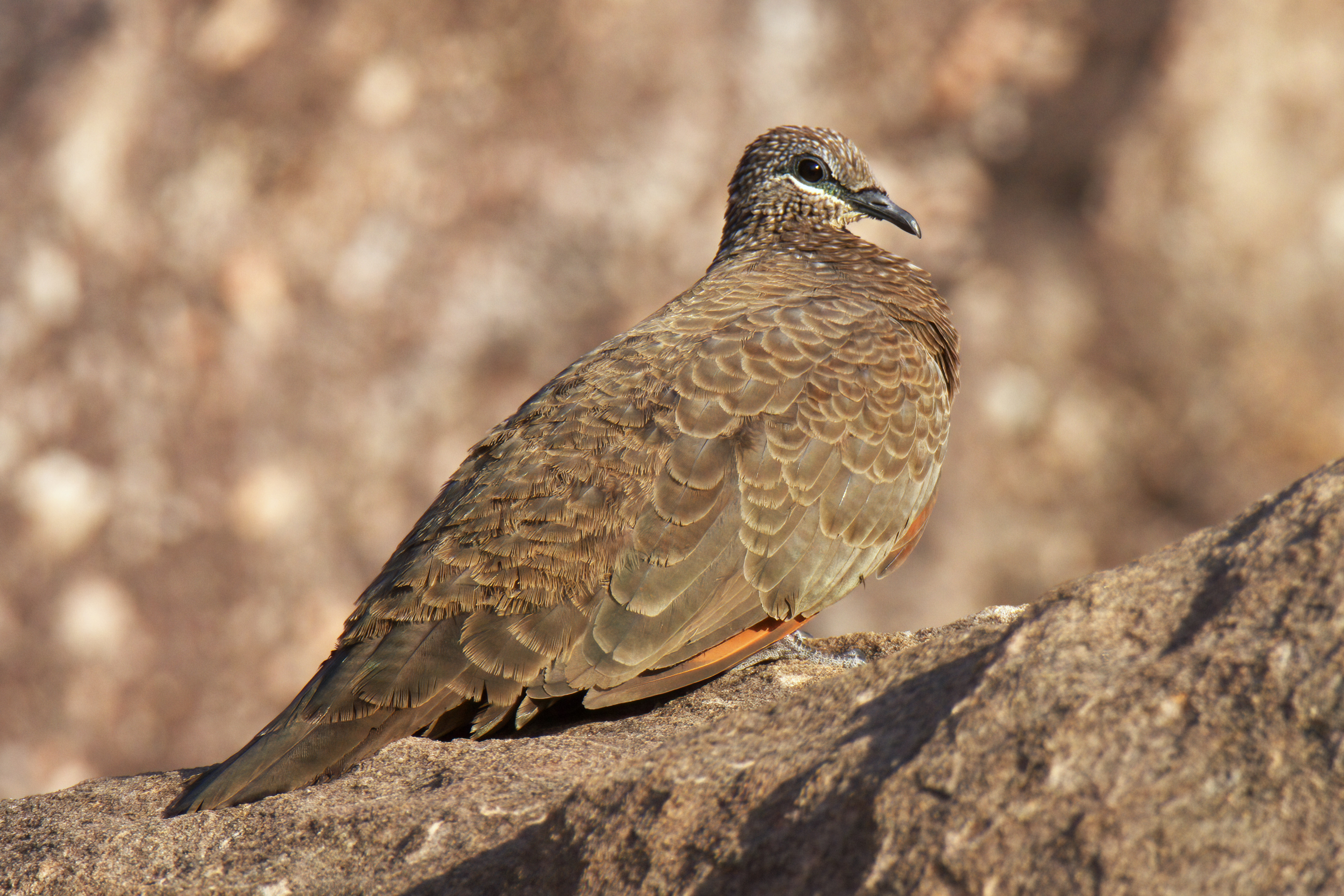

Conservation status
- Least Concern (IUCN 3.1)

Scientific classification
- Kingdom: Animalia
- Phylum: Chordata
- Class: Aves
- Order: Columbiformes
- Family: Columbidae
- Genus: Petrophassa
- Species: P. rufipennis

Binomial name
- Petrophassa rufipennis Collett, 1898

= Chestnut-quilled rock pigeon =

Species of bird

The chestnut-quilled rock pigeon (Petrophassa rufipennis) is a dark sooty brown pigeon with a distinctive bright chestnut patch on its wing visible in flight. It has distinctive pale lines across its face curving above and below its eye. A species of bird in the family Columbidae, it is very similar in behaviour and habitat to the white-quilled rock pigeon but it is only found on rocky escarpments in western Arnhem Land in the Northern Territory of Australia.

== Taxonomy and systematics ==
The chestnut-quilled rock pigeon was observed by the German naturalist Ludwig Leichhardt near the head of the South Alligator River in the Northern Territory of Australia, on 11 November 1845 while on a journey to Port Essington but no specimen was collected. The species was formally described and illustrated in 1898 by the Norwegian naturalist Robert Collett based on a specimen that had been collected from the same locality by the explorer Knut Dahl. Collett coined the binomial name Petrophassa rufipennis.

The common name rock-pigeon is a reference to the association of the genus to tropical sandstone escarpments. The genus name derives from Greek words: petros meaning rock (its preferred habitat) and phassa a wild pigeon giving Petrophassa. The species name comes from the Latin rufus meaning red and penna meaning feather hence pennis meaning winged descriptive of the large chestnut red patch on its wing.

== Description ==
The chestnut-quilled rock pigeon is a dark sooty brown pigeon with a distinctive bright chestnut patch on its wing visible in flight. This patch is often hidden in the folded wing.

The pigeon has a wingspan of 138 to 155 mm (5.4 to 6.1 in), a bill measuring 11.0 to 14.5 mm (0.43 to 0.57 in) and weighs between 130 and 178 grams (4.6 and 6.3 oz).

It has black lores and pale spots on the head and neck, chin and throat is whitish. Fine grey lines extend around the eye "extending from above bill and turning over and behind eye; the other from base of bill passing below eye and beneath ear-coverts."

== Behaviour and ecology ==
The pigeon is most often seen when flushed, in pairs or small groups, from a rocky ledge. They fly with loud clapping wing-beats often straight up from a gorge. This typical behaviour was observed by Leichardt in the first recorded observation of the species:

A new species of rock pigeon (Petrophassa, Gould) with a dark brown body, primaries light brown without any white, and the tail feathers rather worn, lived in pairs and small flocks like Geophaps, and flew out of the shade of overhanging rocks, or from the moist wells which the natives had dug in the bed of the creek, around which they clustered like flies round a drop of syrup.

The pigeon's Northern Territory Conservation Status is listed as Near Threatened (NT) while the IUCN Red List identifies the pigeon's conservation status as Least Concern (LC).

The chestnut-quilled rock pigeon shares a distinctive jizz and habitat type with the white-quilled rock pigeon, but are limited in extent to the sandstone country of Arnhem Land and Kakadu.
