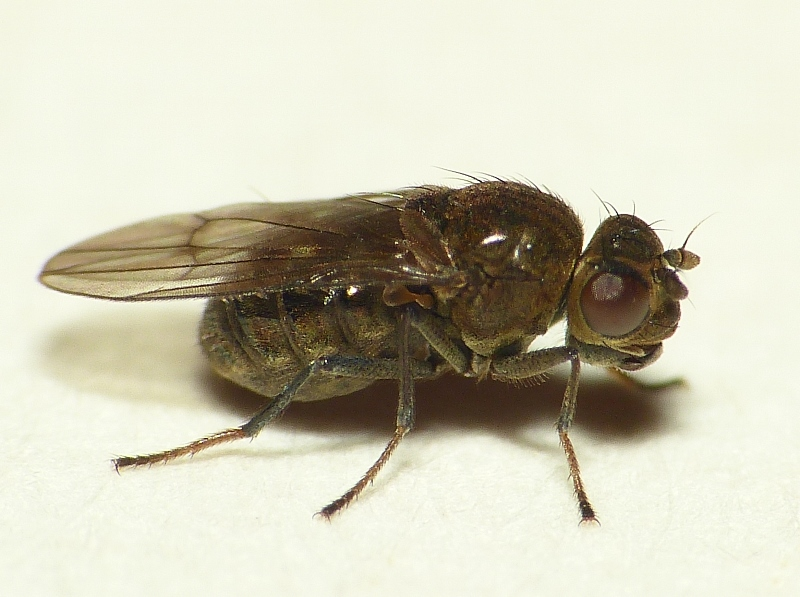
- Parydra fossarum Netherlands

Scientific classification
- Kingdom: Animalia
- Phylum: Arthropoda
- Clade: Pancrustacea
- Class: Insecta
- Order: Diptera
- Family: Ephydridae
- Genus: Parydra
- Species: P. fossarum

Binomial name
- Parydra fossarum (Haliday, 1833)

= Parydra fossarum =

Species of fly

Parydra fossarum is a species of fly in the family Ephydridae. It is found in the Palearctic. May to December. Associated with wetland or coastal habitats.
