= Limnellia =

- Video

Scientific classification
- Kingdom: Animalia
- Phylum: Arthropoda
- Class: Insecta
- Order: Diptera
- Family: Ephydridae
- Subfamily: Ephydrinae
- Tribe: Scatellini
- Genus: Limnellia; Malloch, 1925

Type species
- Limnellia maculipennis Malloch, 1925

Synonyms
- Stictoscatella Collin, 1930; Eustigoptera Cresson, 1930; Stranditella Duda, 1942

Genus of flies

Limnellia is a genus of shore flies in the family Ephydridae.

== Species ==
- L. anderssoni Mathis, 1978
- L. anna Cresson, 1935
- L. balioptera Mathis, 1978
- L. fallax (Czerny, 1903)^{c g}
- L. flavifrontis Costa, Savaris, Marinoni & Mathis, 2016
- L. flavitarsis Zhang & Yang, 2009^{g}
- L. helmuti Hollmann-Schirrmacher & Zatwarnicki, 1995^{c g}
- L. huachuca Mathis, 1978
- L. itatiaia Mathis, 1980
- L. lactea Mathis, 1978
- L. lecocercus Mathis, 1978
- L. luchunensis Zhang & Yang, 2009
- L. maculipennis Malloch, 1925
- L. minima Canzoneri & Meneghini, 1969
- L. picta Canzoneri & Meneghini, 1969
- L. quadrata (Fallén, 1813)
- L. rainier Mathis and Zack, 1980^{i c g}
- L. sejuncta (Loew, 1863)^{i c g}
- L. stenhammari (Zetterstedt, 1846)^{i c g}
- L. sticta Mathis, 1978
- L. surturi Andersson, 1971
- L. turneri Mathis, 1978
- L. vounitis Costa, Savaris, Marinoni & Mathis, 2016

Data sources: i = ITIS, c = Catalogue of Life, g = GBIF, b = Bugguide.net
