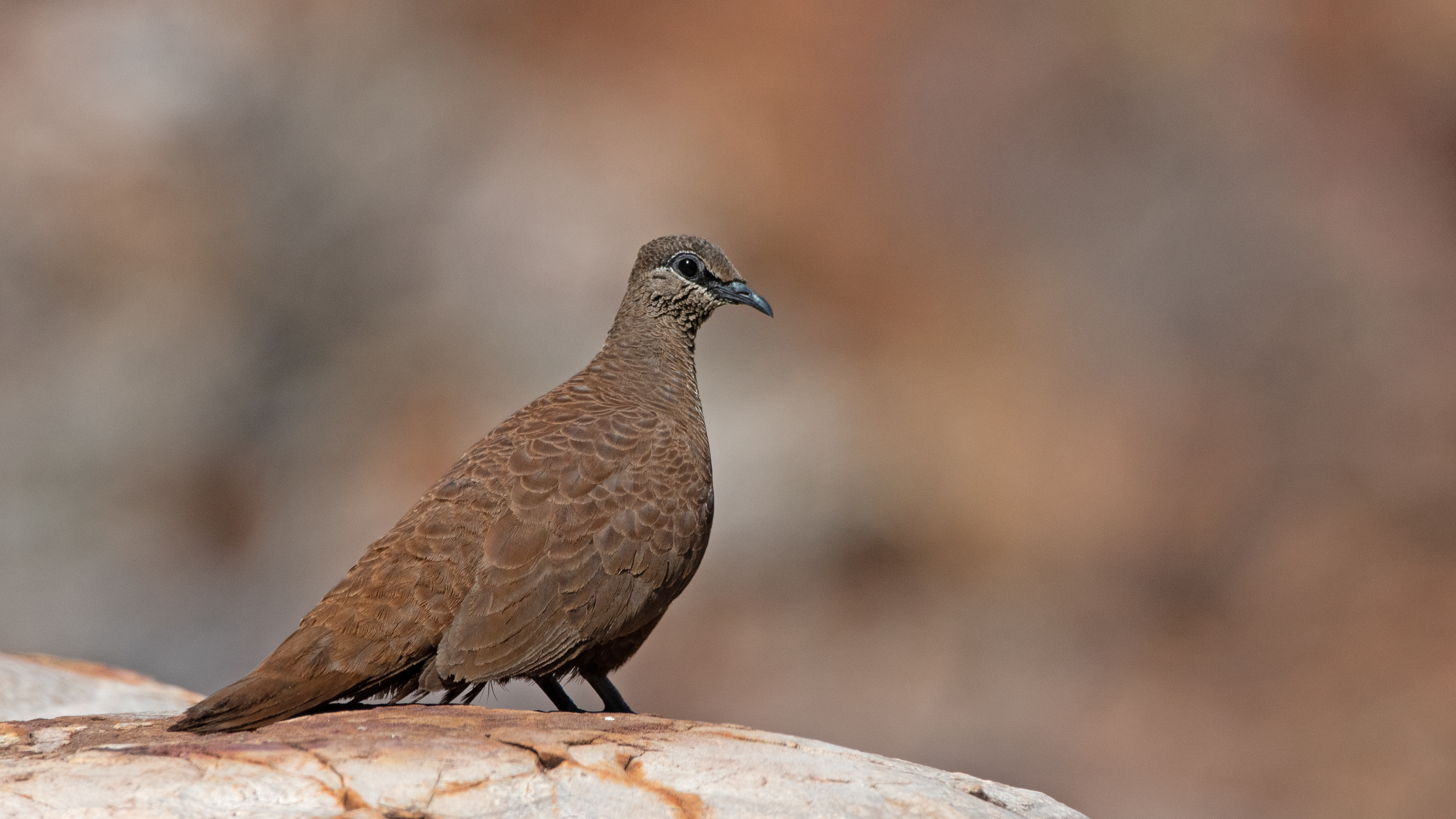
- White-quilled Rock Pigeon at Wyndham, Western Australia

Conservation status
- Least Concern (IUCN 3.1)

Scientific classification
- Kingdom: Animalia
- Phylum: Chordata
- Class: Aves
- Order: Columbiformes
- Family: Columbidae
- Genus: Petrophassa
- Species: P. albipennis

Binomial name
- Petrophassa albipennis Gould, 1841

= White-quilled rock pigeon =

Species of bird

The white-quilled rock pigeon (Petrophassa albipennis) is a dark brown rock pigeon with a white patch on its wing. It has distinctive pale lines across its face curving above and below its eye. It is a species of bird in the family Columbidae. It is a rock dweller found roosting on sandstone cliffs and towers in the Kimberley, WA and east of the Victoria River, NT. It is endemic to Australia.

== Taxonomy and systematics ==
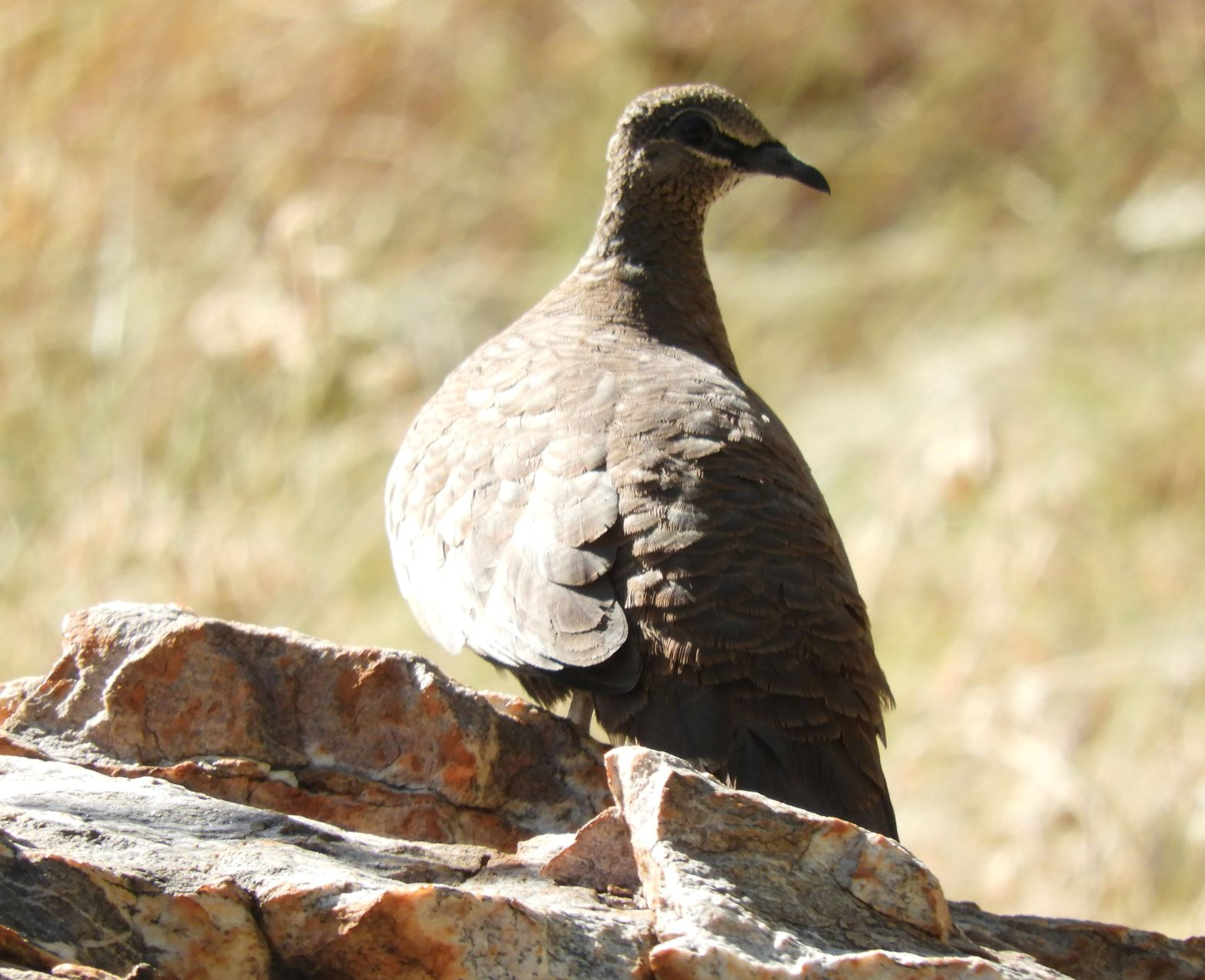
White-quilled rock-pigeon on sandstone escarpment.

There are two species of rock pigeon in Australia, the white-quilled and the chestnut-quilled. Their name reflects their habitat specialisation of sandstone gorges and rocky escarpments.

Petrophassa albipennis was identified and named by John Gould in 1841. It reflects the aptness of the name that no alternatives have ever been recorded. The genus name derives from Greek words: petros meaning rock (its preferred habitat) and phassa a wild pigeon giving Petrophassa, and the species name derives from the Latin albus meaning dull white and penna meaning feather leading to pennis meaning -winged referring to the large white patch on its wing when spread.

Two subspecies are recognised:

- P. a. albipennis - Gould, 1841 which is found in the Kimberley of Western Australia (WA), and in northwest Northern Territory (NT) as far east as the upper Daly River catchment.
- P. a. boothi - Goodwin, 1969 which has a limited distribution around the Victoria River in the Northern Territory.

== Description ==
The white-quilled rock pigeon is a large mid-brown to reddish-brown pigeon. It has wings measuring 122 to 145 mm and a bill 11.0 to 14.5 mm in length. Subspecies albipennis weighs 117 to 156 grams while the smaller subspecies boothi weighs between 103 and 142 grams. It has white spots on its chin and forehead. The orbital skin is grey. Although their common name derives from the white wing panels visible in flight, its facial markings are also distinctive. There are thin, pale lines "across the face, from the base of upper mandible curving above and behind eye, and from lower mandible below eye and curving across sides of head."

Subspecies albipennis, found mostly in WA, has large white patches on its wings while subspecies boothi, found in the NT, has smaller patches.

== Behaviour and ecology ==
The IUCN Red List identifies the pigeon's conservation status as Least Concern (LC) but its Northern Territory Conservation Status is listed as Near Threatened (NT).

The pigeon's habitat is rocky escarpments and gorges where they move easily among the rocks and boulders. They share a distinctive jizz with the chestnut-quilled rock pigeon, often appearing on a prominent rock or ledge with their body held horizontally, their tail held clear of the ground and their wings drooping below their tail.

The white-quilled rock pigeon's defining characteristics were first recorded when the type specimens were collected by officers of HMS Beagle and detailed in an account of his Australian voyages of the Beagle by her commander, John Lort Stokes:

"(Feb. 11) . . . Some rather small pigeons (Petrophila albipennis Gould), of a dark brown colour, marked with a white patch on the wings, were seen, and some specimens shot. They made a whirring sound in flight, like the partridge, and appeared to haunt the rocks; a habit which all subsequent observation confirmed."

— Stokes, 1846: 109-11 quoted in Parker,1968: 57-58

They fly with a characteristic loud clattering of wings, often gliding from one high prominence to another. They feed in adjacent grassy woodlands but return to their escarpments when startled.

== Gallery ==
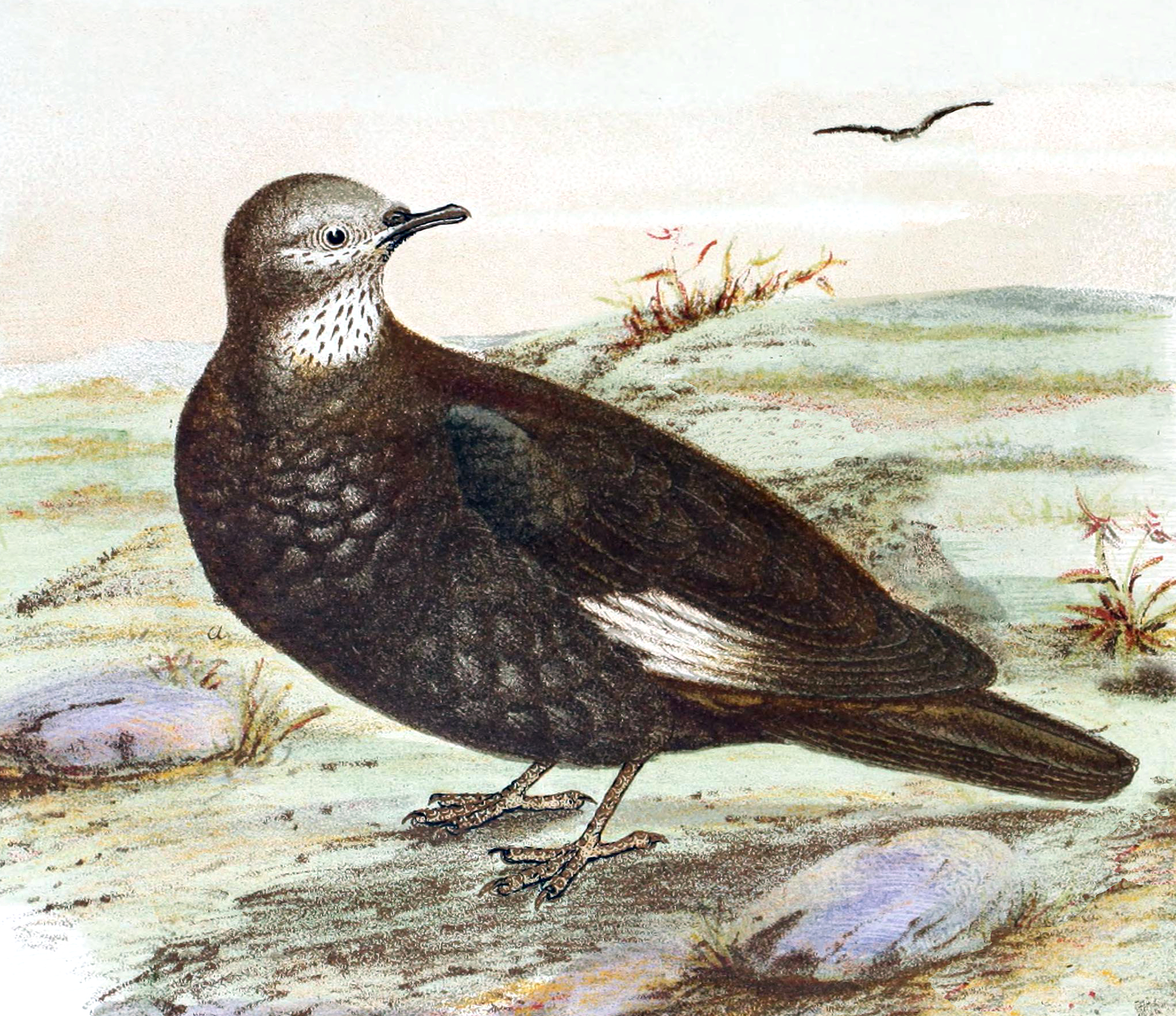
White-quilled rock pigeon (Cropped extract from The Birds of Australia, Gould 1848)

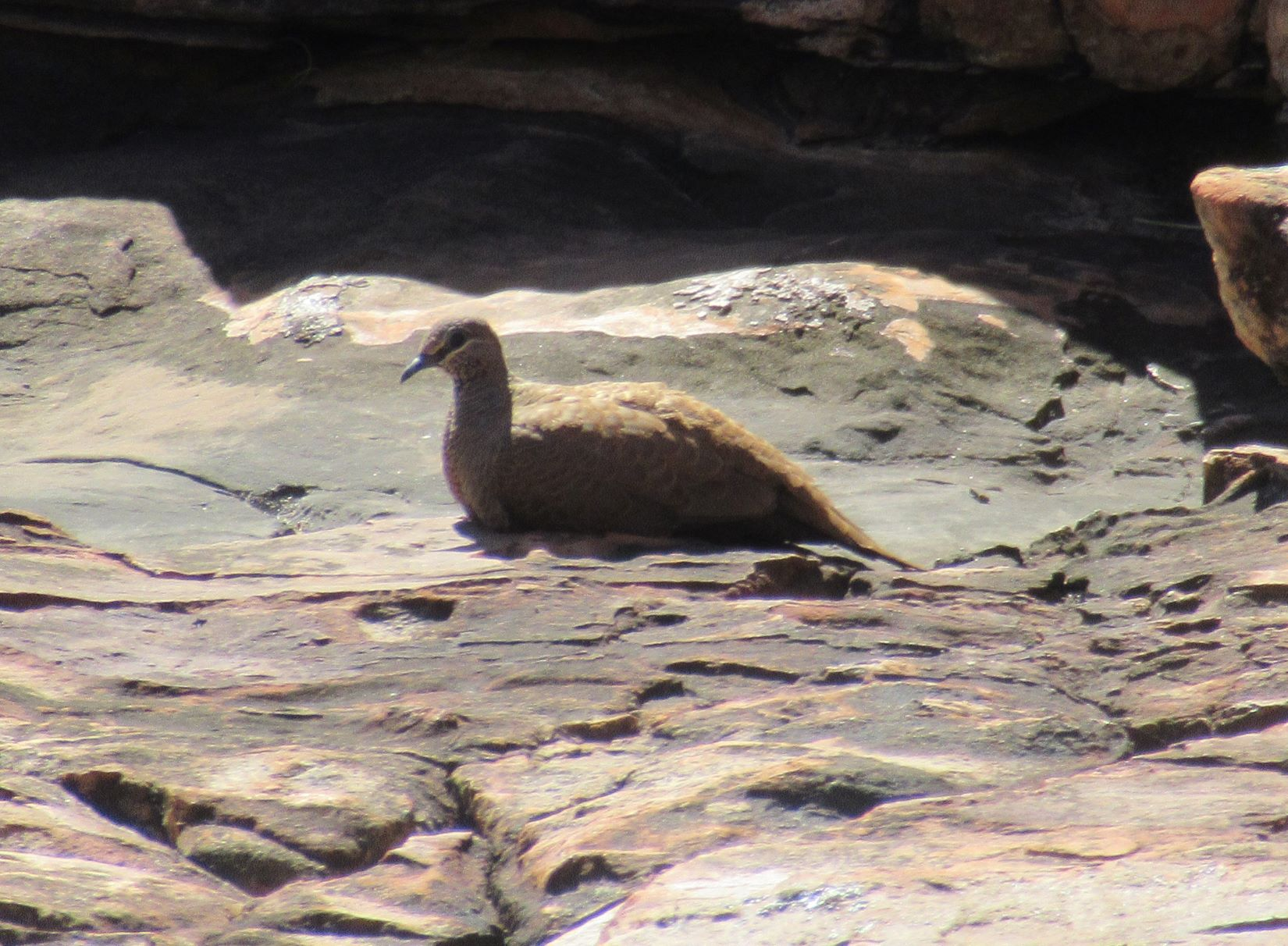
White-quilled rock pigeon, The Grotto, Wyndham, Western Australia

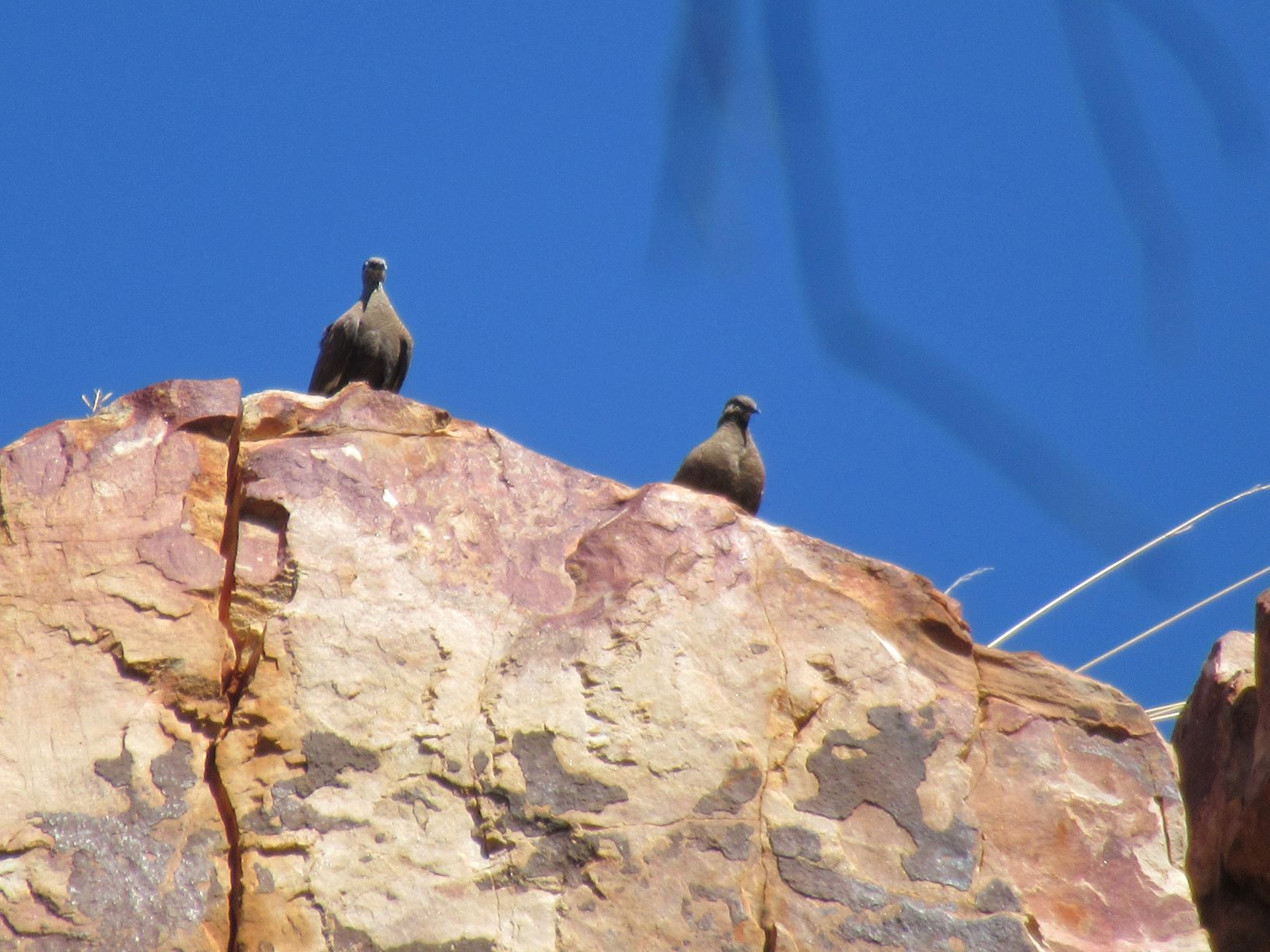
White-quilled rock pigeon perched on an escarpment, The Grotto, Wyndham, Western Australia

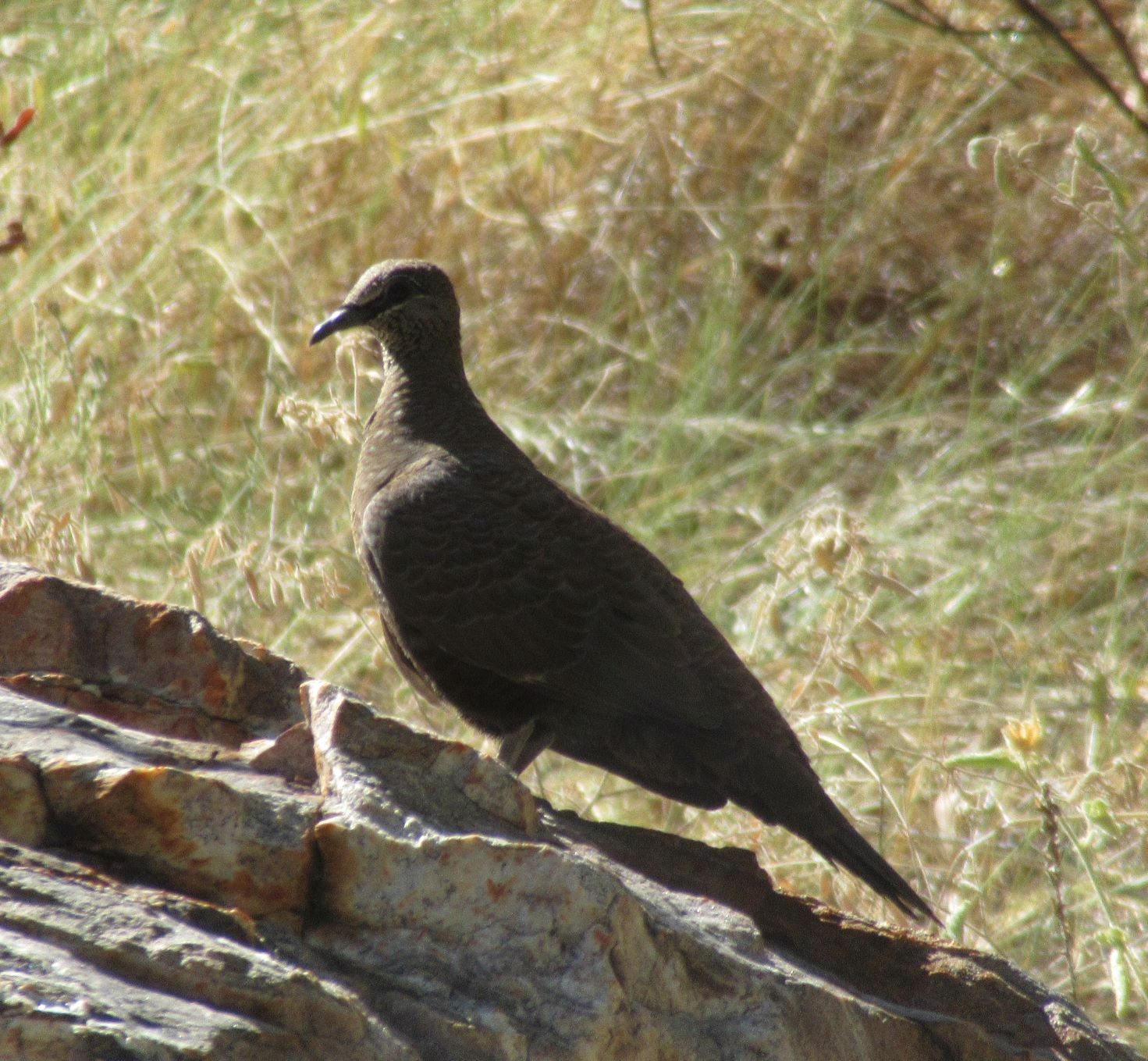
White-quilled rock pigeon showing typical jizz, Moochalabra Dam, near Wyndham, WA
