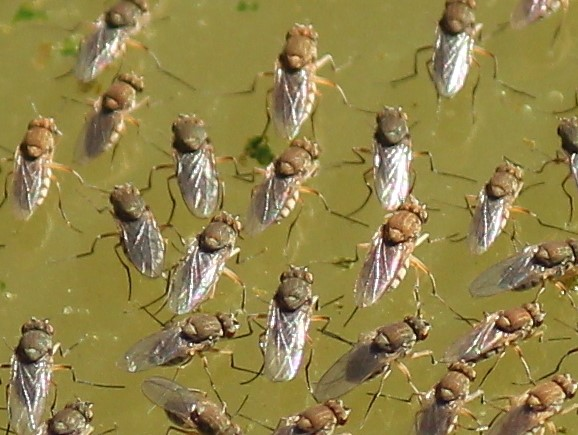
- Brachydeutera sp.

Scientific classification
- Kingdom: Animalia
- Phylum: Arthropoda
- Class: Insecta
- Order: Diptera
- Family: Ephydridae
- Subfamily: Ephydrinae
- Tribe: Scatellini
- Genus: Brachydeutera; Loew, 1862

Type species
- Brachydeutera dimidiata Loew, 1862

= Brachydeutera =

Genus of flies

Brachydeutera is a genus of shore flies in the family Ephydridae. There are about 16 described species in the genus Brachydeutera.

== Species ==
These 16 species belong to the genus Brachydeutera:

- B. adusta Mathis & Ghorpade, 1985
- B. africana Wirth, 1964
- B. argentata (Walker, 1852)
- B. brunnea Wirth, 1964
- B. congolensis Wirth, 1964
- B. dentata Mathis & Winkler, 2003
- B. hardyi Wirth, 1964
- B. hebes (Cresson, 1926)
- B. ibari Ninomyia, 1929
- B. longipes Hendel, 1913
- B. munroi Cresson, 1939
- B. neotropica Wirth, 1964
- B. pleuralis Malloch, 1928
- B. stuckenbergi Wirth, 1964
- B. sturtevanti Wirth, 1964
- B. sydneyensis Malloch, 1924
