= Cirrula =

Scientific classification
- Kingdom: Animalia
- Phylum: Arthropoda
- Clade: Pancrustacea
- Class: Insecta
- Order: Diptera
- Family: Ephydridae
- Subfamily: Ephydrinae
- Tribe: Ephydrini
- Genus: Cirrula; Cresson, 1915

Synonyms
- Pogonephydra Hendel, 1917

Genus of flies

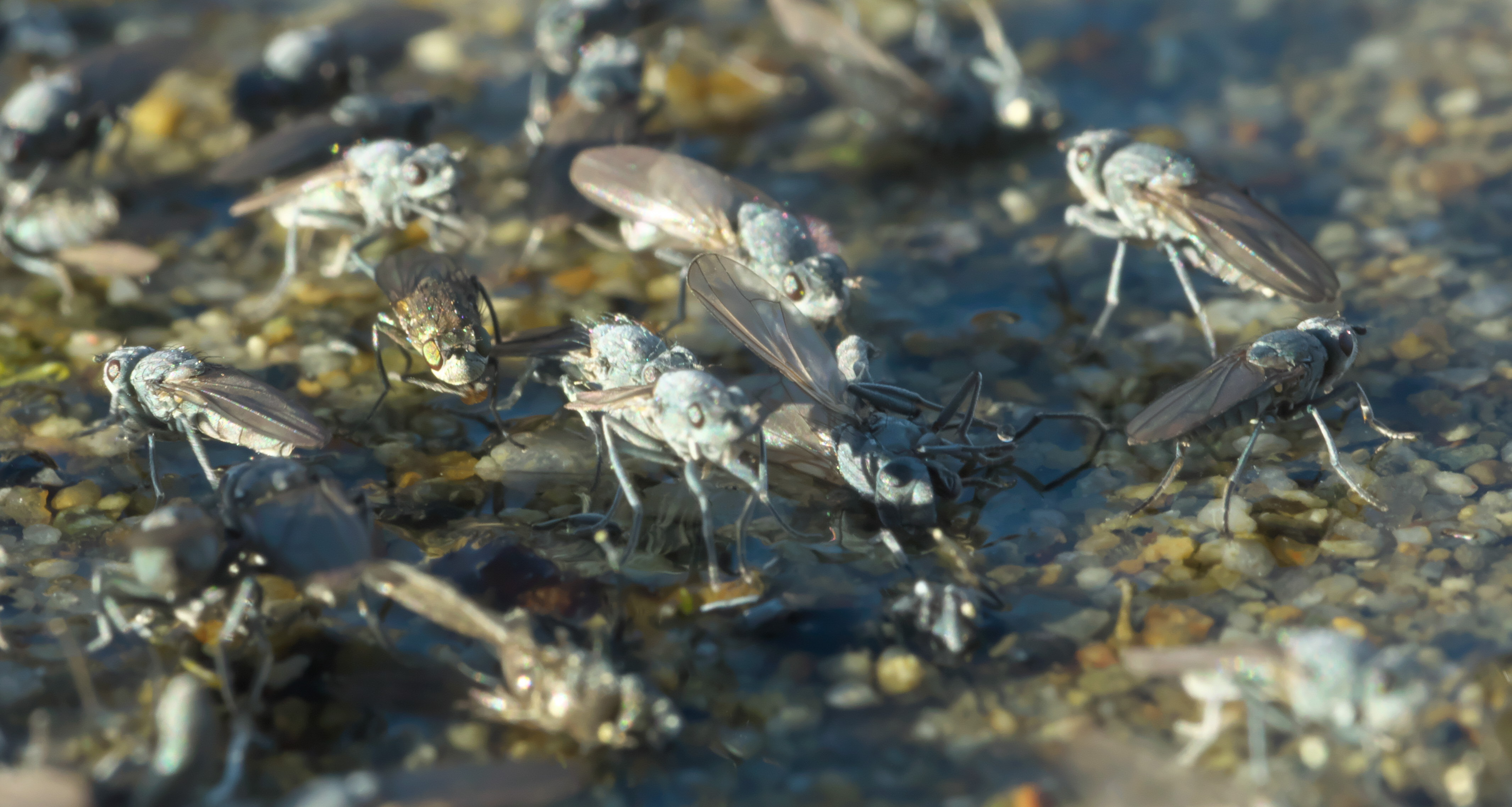
Cirrula hians, shore flies, Ephydridae family

Cirrula is a genus of North American shore flies in the family Ephydridae.

== Species ==
- C. austrina (Coquillett, 1900)
- C. gigantea Cresson, 1915
