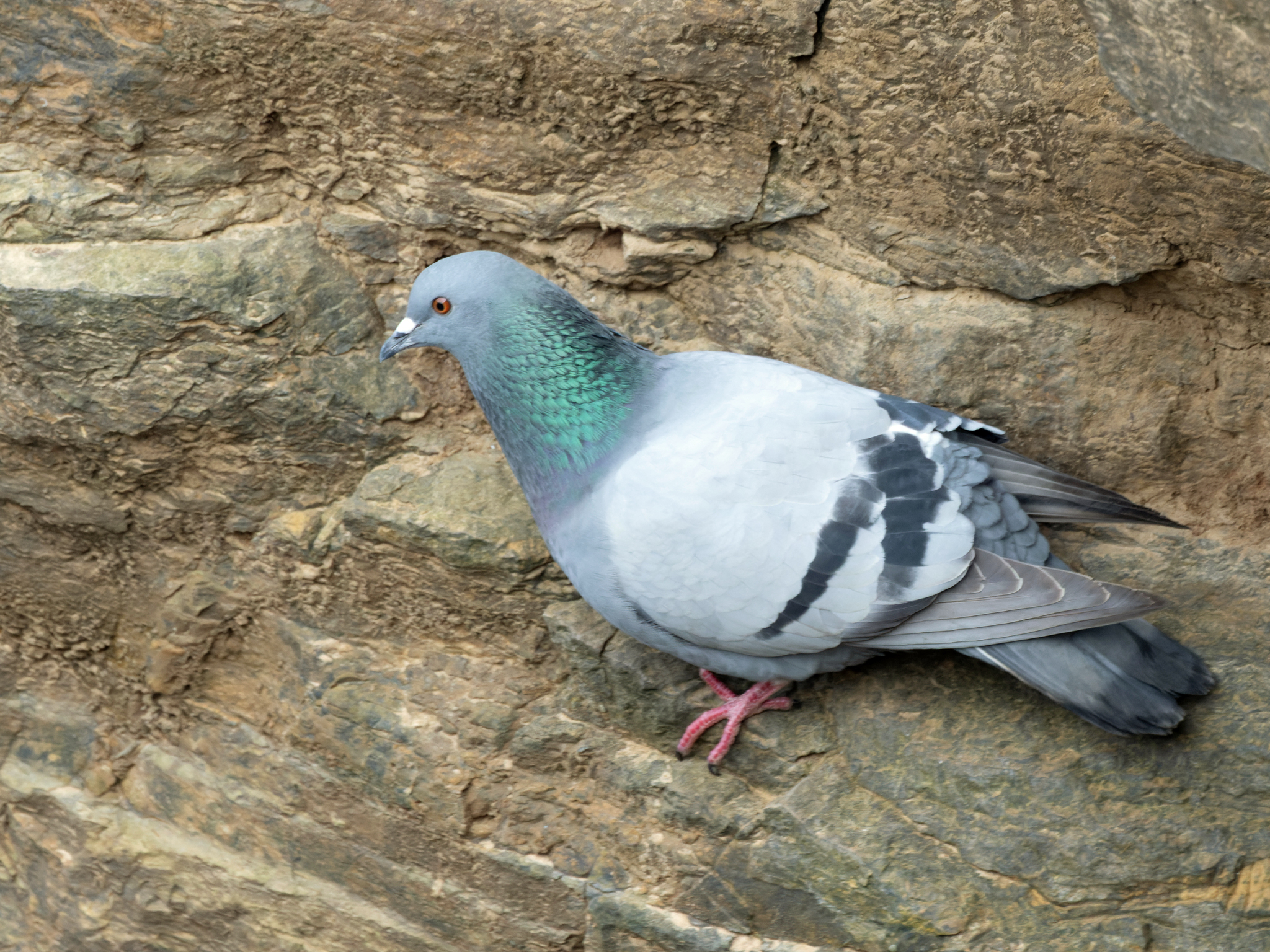
- Columba livia livia, wild, Duncansby Head, Caithness, Scotland
- Rock dove (feral) calling

Conservation status
- Least Concern (IUCN 3.1)

Scientific classification
- Kingdom: Animalia
- Phylum: Chordata
- Class: Aves
- Order: Columbiformes
- Family: Columbidae
- Genus: Columba
- Species: C. livia

Binomial name
- Columba livia Gmelin, JF, 1789
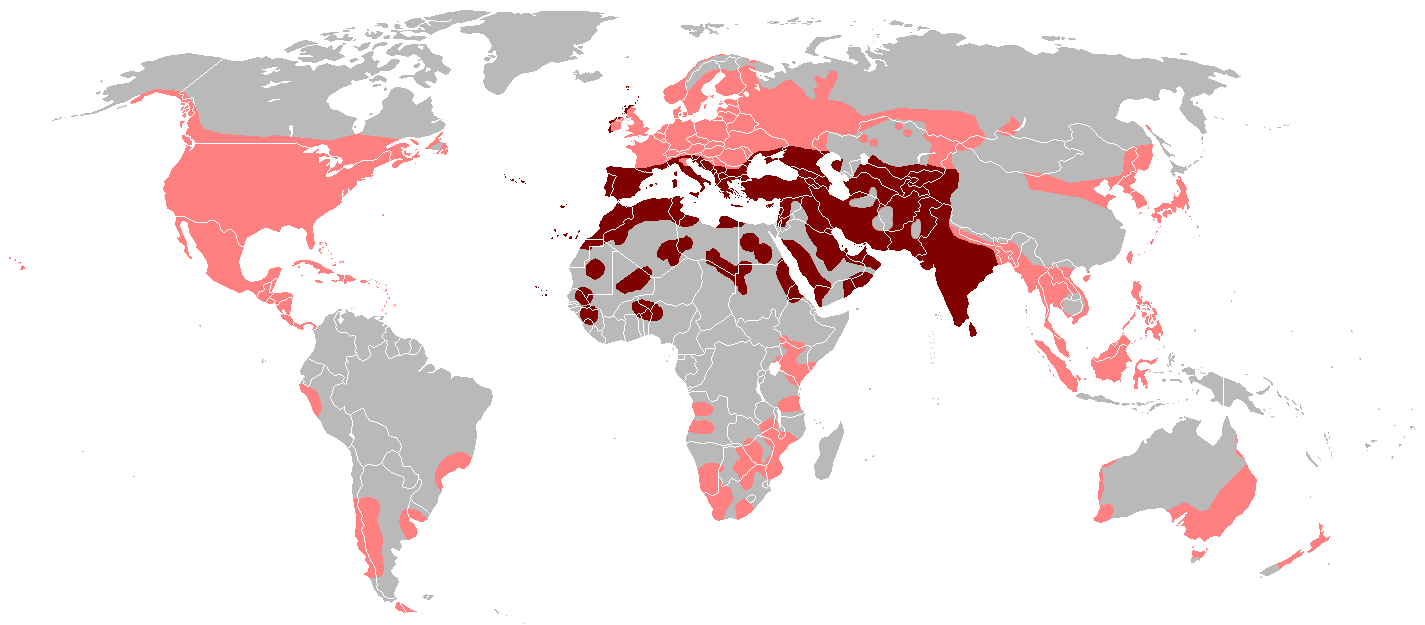
- approximate native range introduced non-native populations

= Rock dove =

Ancestor of domestic pigeon

The rock dove (Columba livia), also known as the common pigeon or rock pigeon (but see also Petrophassa), is a member of the bird family Columbidae (doves and pigeons). In common usage, it is often simply referred to as the "pigeon", although the rock dove is the wild form of the bird; the pigeons familiar to most people are the domesticated forms of the wild rock dove.

Wild rock doves are uniformly pale grey with two black bars on each wing, with few differences being seen between males and females; i.e. they are not strongly sexually dimorphic. The domestic pigeon, often called "Columba livia domestica", which includes about 1,000 different breeds, is descended from this species. Escaped domestic pigeons are the origin of feral pigeons around the world. Both forms can vary widely in the colour and pattern of their plumage unlike their wild ancestor, being red, brown, checkered, uniformly coloured, or pied.

Habitats include various open and semi-open environments where they are able to forage on the ground. Cliffs and rock ledges are used for roosting and breeding in the wild. Originating in Southern Europe, North Africa, and Western Asia, when including their domestic and feral descendants, they are an example of a least-concern species per IUCN among birds, being abundant with an estimated population of 17 to 28 million wild and feral birds in Europe alone and up to 120 million worldwide.

== Taxonomy and systematics ==
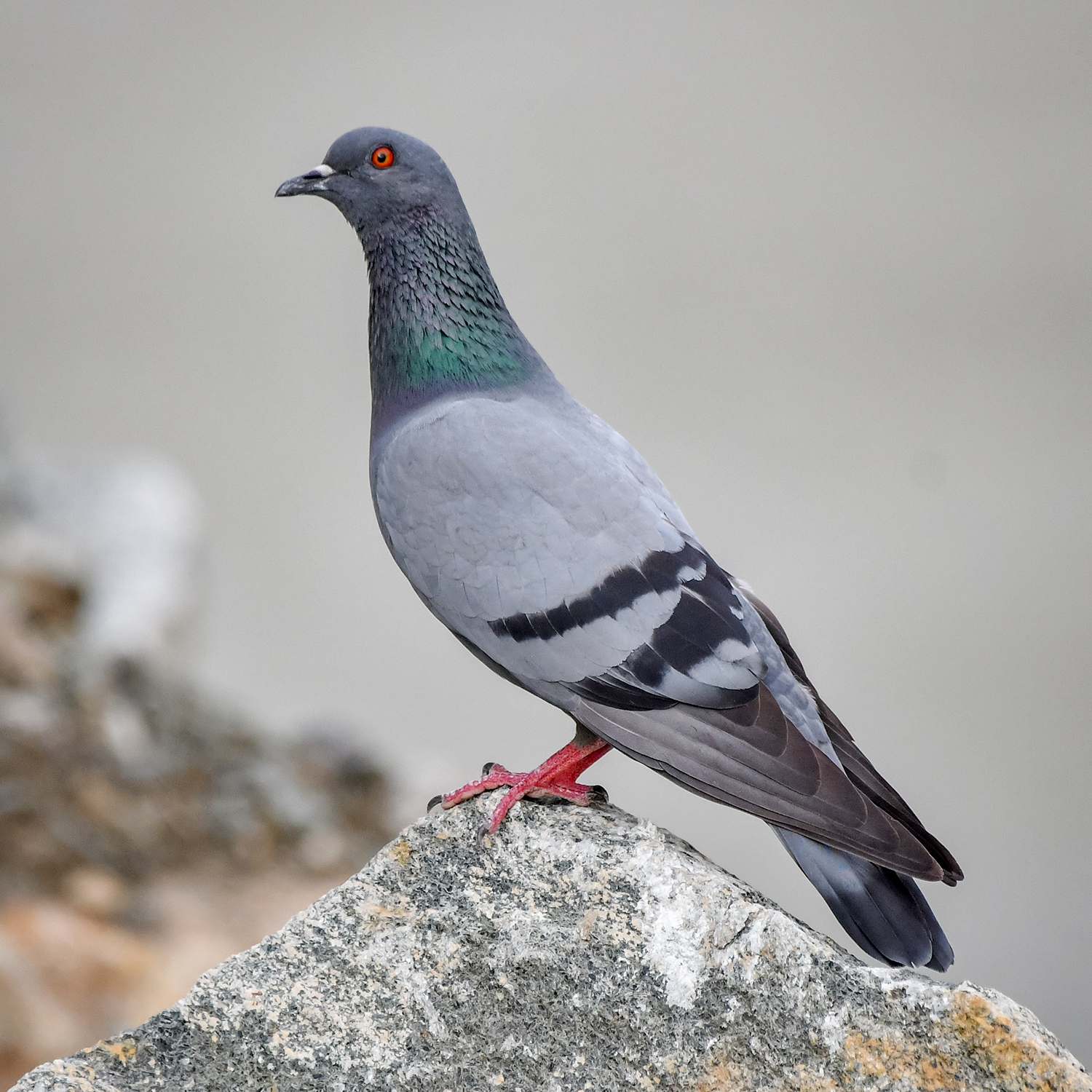
C. l. neglecta, Raikot, Gilgit-Baltistan, Pakistan

The official standard English name is rock dove, as given by the International Ornithological Congress.

The rock dove was formally described in 1789 by the German naturalist Johann Friedrich Gmelin in his revised and expanded edition of Systema Naturae written by Carl Linnaeus. He placed it with all the other doves and pigeons in the genus Columba and coined the binomial name Columba livia. The genus name Columba is the Latin word meaning "pigeon, dove", whose older etymology comes from the Ancient Greek κόλυμβος (kólumbos), "a diver", hence κολυμβάω (kolumbáō), "dive, plunge headlong, swim". Aristophanes (Birds 304) and others use the word κολυμβίς (kolumbís), "diver", for the name of the bird, because of its swimming motion in the air. The specific epithet livia is a Medieval Latin variant of livida, "livid, bluish-grey"; this was Theodorus Gaza's translation of Greek péleia, "dove", itself thought to be derived from pellós, "dark-coloured".

No original material was designated by Gmelin in his description of the species, and consequently a neotype specimen, from Fair Isle in Scotland, has been designated to define the species and its nominate subspecies C. l. livia.

Its closest relative in the genus Columba is the hill pigeon, followed by the snow, speckled, and white-collared pigeons. Pigeon chicks are called "squabs". Note that members of the pigeon genus Petrophassa and the speckled pigeon (Columba guinea), also have the common name "rock pigeon".

=== Subspecies ===
Nine subspecies are recognised:

- C. l. livia Gmelin, JF, 1789 – west, central Europe, north Africa to central Asia
- C. l. gymnocycla Gray, GR, 1856 – Mauritania and Senegal to south Mali and Ghana
- C. l. targia Geyr von Schweppenburg, 1916 – north Mali and south Algeria to central Sudan
- C. l. schimperi Bonaparte, 1854 – east Egypt, south Sudan and Eritrea
- C. l. dakhlae Meinertzhagen, R, 1928 – west Egypt
- C. l. palaestinae Zedlitz, 1912 – Sinai Peninsula (Egypt) to Syria, to west and south Arabian Peninsula
- C. l. gaddi Zarudny & Loudon, 1906 – east Turkey to Uzbekistan, to west and north Afghanistan
- C. l. neglecta Hume, 1873 – west Pakistan and east Afghanistan to the Himalayas
- C. l. intermedia Strickland, 1844 – south India and Sri Lanka

== Description ==
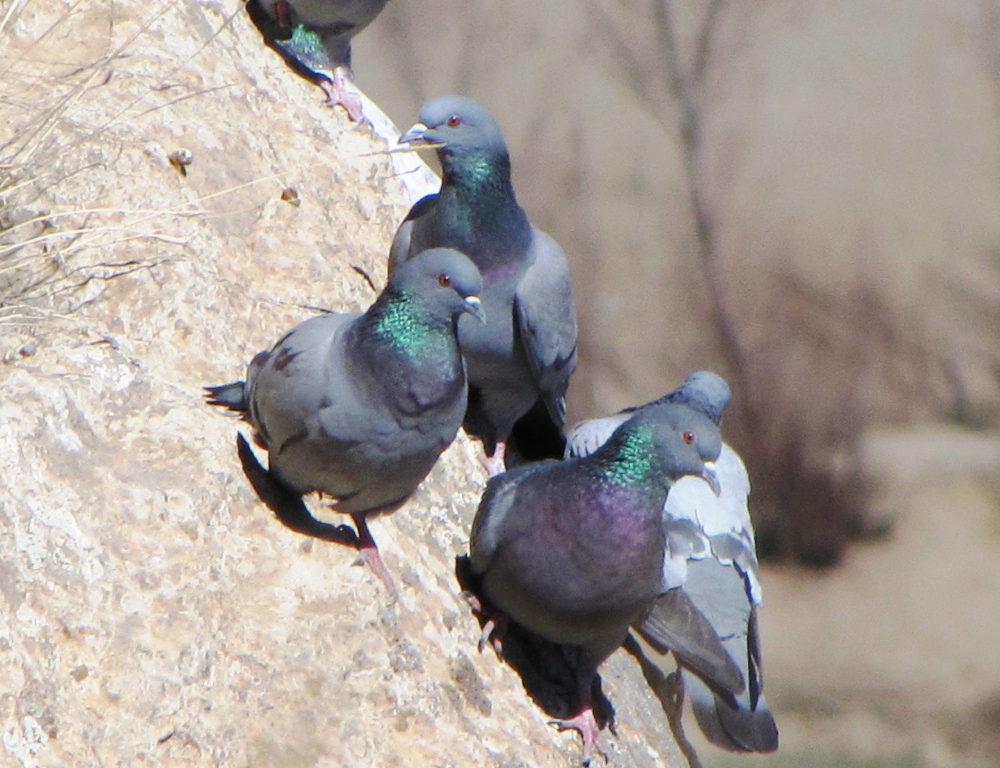
A flock of C. l. gaddi in West Azerbaijan Province, Iran, showing their petrophillic nature

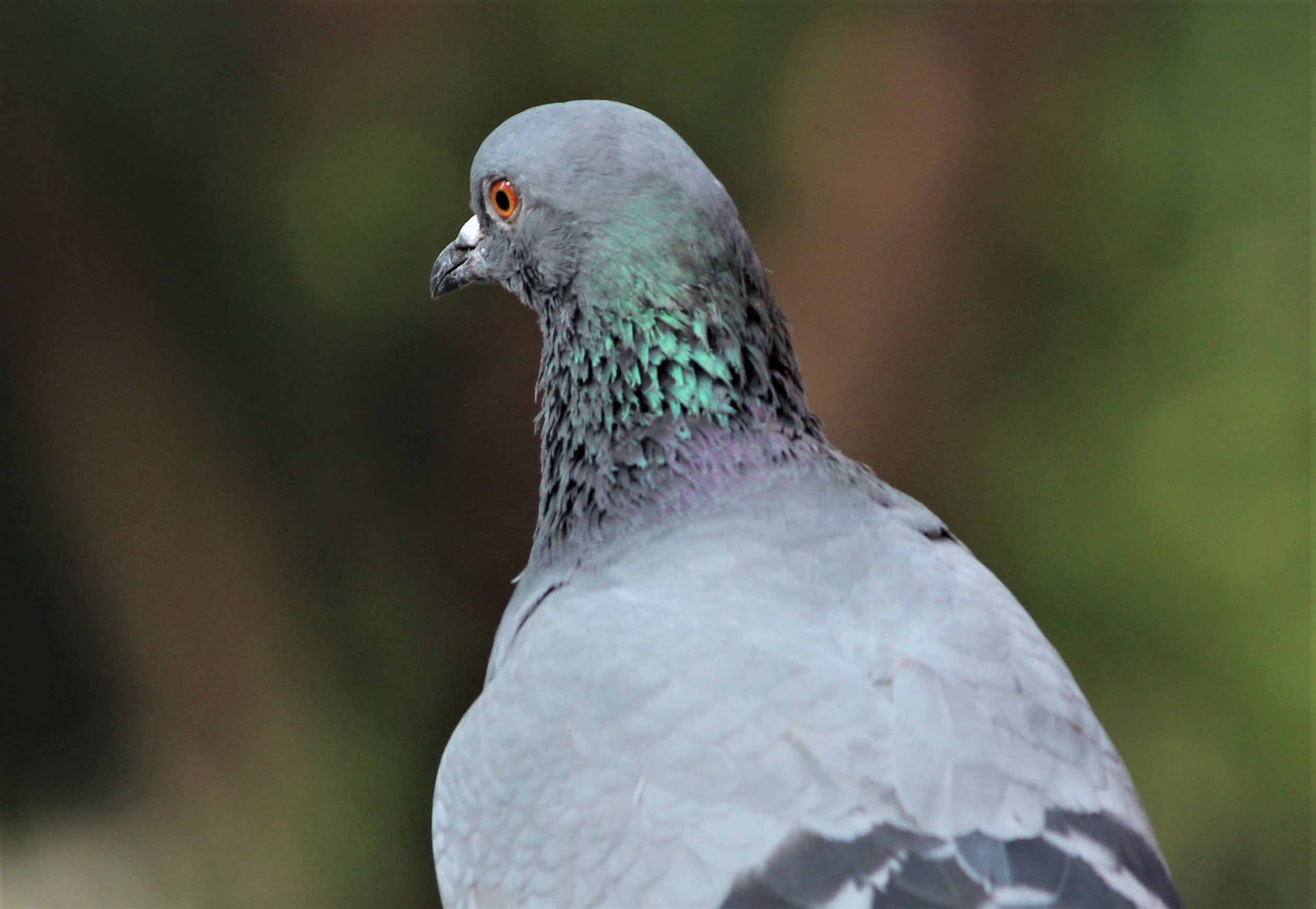
The iridescence wraps around the entire neck.

Millennia of domestication have greatly altered the rock dove in many regions. Domestic and Feral pigeons, which arose through selective breeding, not originating naturally, have significant variation in plumage from the natural wild birds. This wild type is endangered in many areas; the nominate subspecies C. l. livia persists most notably in the far north and west of Scotland, most strongly so in the Outer Hebrides.

The adult of the nominate subspecies of the rock dove is 30 to 35 cm (12 to 14 in) long with a 62 to 68 cm (24 to 27 in) wingspan. Weight for wild or feral rock doves ranges from 238–380 g (8.4–13.4 oz), though overfed domestic and semi-domestic individuals can exceed normal weights. For standard measurements, the wing chord is typically around 22.3 cm (8.8 in), the tail is 9.5 to 11 cm (3.7 to 4.3 in), the bill is around 1.8 cm (0.71 in), and the tarsus is 2.6 to 3.5 cm (1.0 to 1.4 in).

This species has dark bluish-grey head, neck, and chest feathers with glossy greenish to reddish-purple iridescence along its neck feathers. The white lower back of the pure rock dove is its best identification characteristic; the two black bars on its pale grey wings are also distinctive. The tail has a black band on the end, and the outer web of the tail feathers are margined with white. The iris is red-brown. The eyelids are grey with a very narrow bluish-grey to grey-white eye ring (wider in domesticated and feral birds). The bill is grey-black with a small off-white cere (with domesticated and feral birds having a much larger cere). The feet are red to pink.

The adult female is almost identical in outward appearance to the male, but the iridescence on her neck is less intense and more restricted to the rear and sides, whereas that on the breast is often very obscure. Young females show little lustre and are duller.

When circling overhead, the white underwing of the bird becomes conspicuous. In its flight, behaviour, and voice, which is more of a dovecot coo than the phrase of the wood pigeon, it is a typical Columba pigeon. Although it is a strong flier, it also glides frequently, holding its wings in a very pronounced V shape as it does.

The various subspecies are similar to the nominate, but can be differentiated:

- C. l. livia, the nominate subspecies, has mid-grey mantle plumage, and a relatively short tail.
- C. l. gymnocycla is smaller and very much darker than the nominate. It is almost blackish on the head, rump and underparts with a white back and the iridescence of the nape extending onto the head.
- C. l. targia is slightly smaller than the nominate, with similar plumage, but the back is concolorous with the mantle instead of white.
- C. l. schimperi closely resembles C. l. targia, but has a distinctly paler mantle.
- C. l. dakhlae is smaller and much paler than the nominate.
- C. l. palaestinae is slightly larger than C. l. schimperi and has darker plumage.
- C. l. gaddi is larger and paler than C. l. palaestinae, with which it intergrades in the west.
- C. l. neglecta it is similar to the nominate in size but darker, with a stronger and more extensive iridescent sheen on the neck. It intergrades with C. l. gaddi in the south.
- C. l. intermedia is similar to C. l. neglecta but darker, with a less contrasting back.

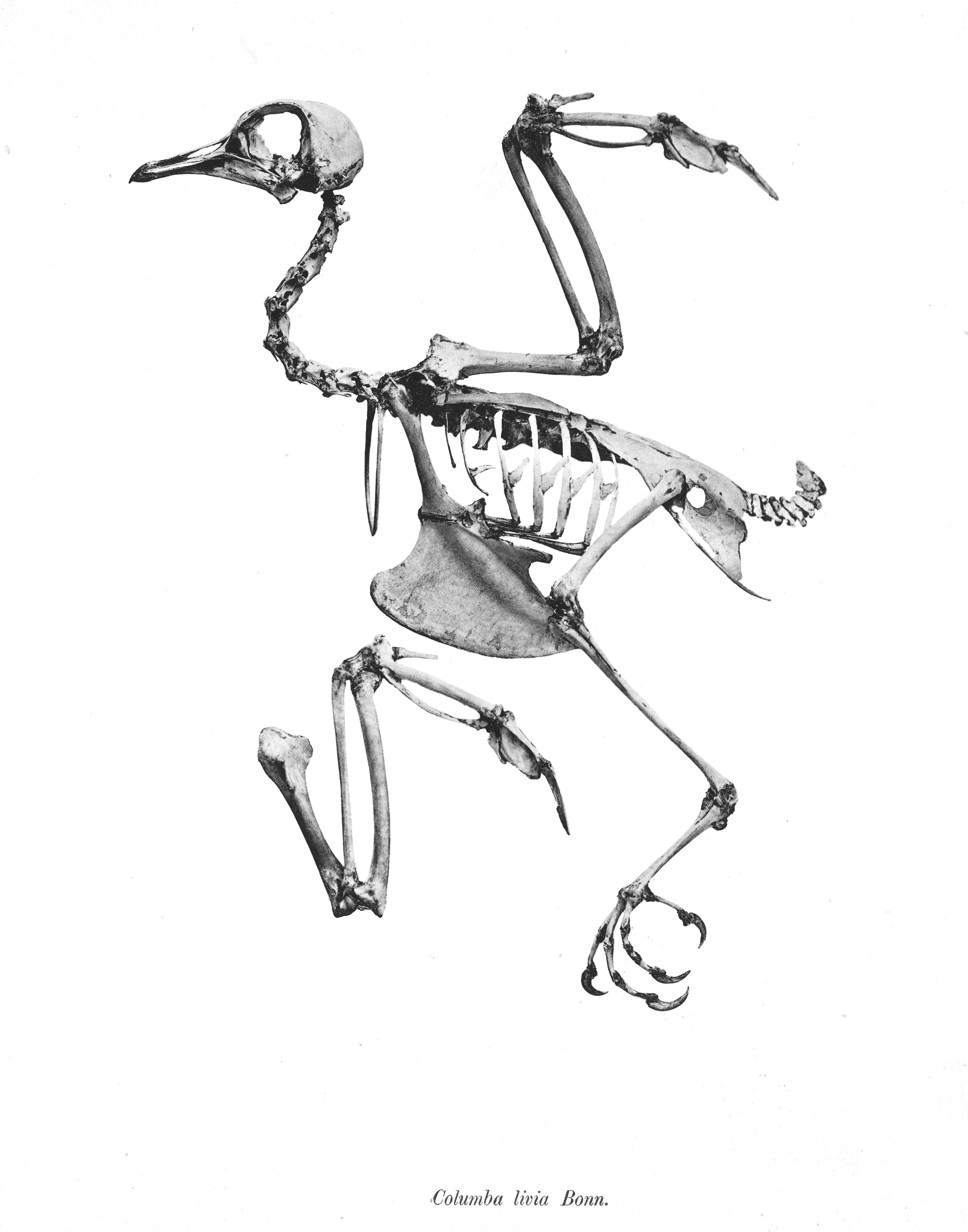
by Adolf Bernhard Meyer, from Abbildungen von Vogel-Skeletten (1879)

There have been numerous skeletal descriptions of the rock dove and the associated muscles including those of the eye, jaw, neck, and throat. The skull is dominated by the rostrum, eye socket, and braincase. The quadrate bone is relatively small and mobile and connects the rest of the cranium to the lower jaw. The latter has an angled shape in lateral view because the long-axis of the front half of the lower jaw is at a 30° angle to the back half. Beneath the skull, the hyoid skeleton involves three mid-line structures and a pair of elongate structures that stem from between the junction of the back two structures. The anterior structure (the paraglossum or entoglossum) is unpaired and shaped like an arrowhead.

Pigeons feathers have two types of melanin (pigment), eumelanin and pheomelanin. A study of melanin in the feathers of both wild rock and domestic pigeons, of different colour types and known genetic background, measured the concentration, distribution and proportions of eumelanin and pheomelanin and found that gene mutations affecting the distribution, amounts and proportions of pigments accounted for the greater variation of colour in domesticated birds than in their wild relations. Eumelanin generally causes grey or black colours, while pheomelanin results in a reddish-brown colour. Other shades of brown may be produced through different combinations and concentrations of the two colours. Darker birds may be better able to store trace metals in their feathers due to their higher concentrations of melanin, which may help mitigate the negative effects of the metals, the concentrations of which are typically higher in urban areas.

=== Vocalisations ===
The call is a soft, slightly wavering, coo "crruoo-u", similar to feral pigeons. Variations include an alarm call, a nest call, and noises made by juveniles. When displaying, songs are partly sexual, partly threatening. They are accompanied by an inflated throat, tail fanning, strutting, and bowing. The alarm call, given at sight of predators, is a grunt-like oorhh.

=== Osmoregulation ===
Osmoregulation in rock doves is complicated by the formation of amine groups, as proteins are broken down for energy. They secrete these amine groups in uric acid, which has the advantage of releasing nitrogen while using only moderate amounts of water, but also has the disadvantage of using much energy, due to uric acid's complex chemical composition.

All Columbids, which includes rock doves, can lower their water intake when food is scarce, and vice versa, as water is needed to excrete toxins, yet maintaining bodily water balance is vital for survival. Although rock doves inhabit arid environments, research shows that their large flight range allows them to reach distant water sources, making bodily water conservation less critical for them.

Unlike other birds, rock doves use their kidneys to maintain homeostatic balance, instead of their salt gland, as kidneys can filter out blood, reabsorb ions and water, and secrete Uric acid. Additionally, the kidneys of birds contain a medullary region, and a cortical region, similar to mammalian kidneys. However, the nephrons of birds cannot directly produce urine that is hyperosmotic to the blood, unlike mammals. Despite this, nephrons with the loop of Henle use a countercurrent mechanism, which allows blood to become hyperosmotic in the collecting duct.

==== Eggshell gas exchange and water loss ====
Birds' eggs are very susceptible to variations in temperature and humidity, as the gas exchange that occurs while an embryo is growing leads to water loss, which in turn can kill the embryo via desiccation. To regulate this, the parents regularly incubate their eggs when the environment changes rapidly, or the environment is very dry, although very humid environments can inhibit respiration. Their eggshells contain pore-like areas, which allow water to diffuse in and out, preventing desiccation of the embryo due via a high rate of water retention. However, thinner eggshells can cause decreases in pore length, increases in conductance and pore area, and decreases in mechanical restriction of the embryo.

== Distribution and habitat ==
The natural distribution of the rock dove is restricted to a resident range in western and southern Europe, North Africa, and extending into South Asia. They were introduced into most of the rest of the world aboard European ships from 1603 onwards. When including feral birds, the species has a very large range, with an estimated global extent of occurrence of 10,000,000 km^{2} (3,900,000 sq mi). It has a large global population, including an estimated 17 to 28 million individuals in Europe. Fossil evidence suggests the rock dove originated in southern Asia, and skeletal remains, unearthed in Israel, confirm its existence there for at least 300,000 years. However, this species has such a long history with humans that it is impossible to identify its original range exactly.

Wild rock doves reside in rock formations and cliff faces, settling in crevices to nest. Wild nesting sites include caves, canyons, and sea cliffs. They will even live in the Sahara so long as an area has rocks, water, and some plant matter. They prefer to avoid dense vegetation.

== Behaviour and ecology ==
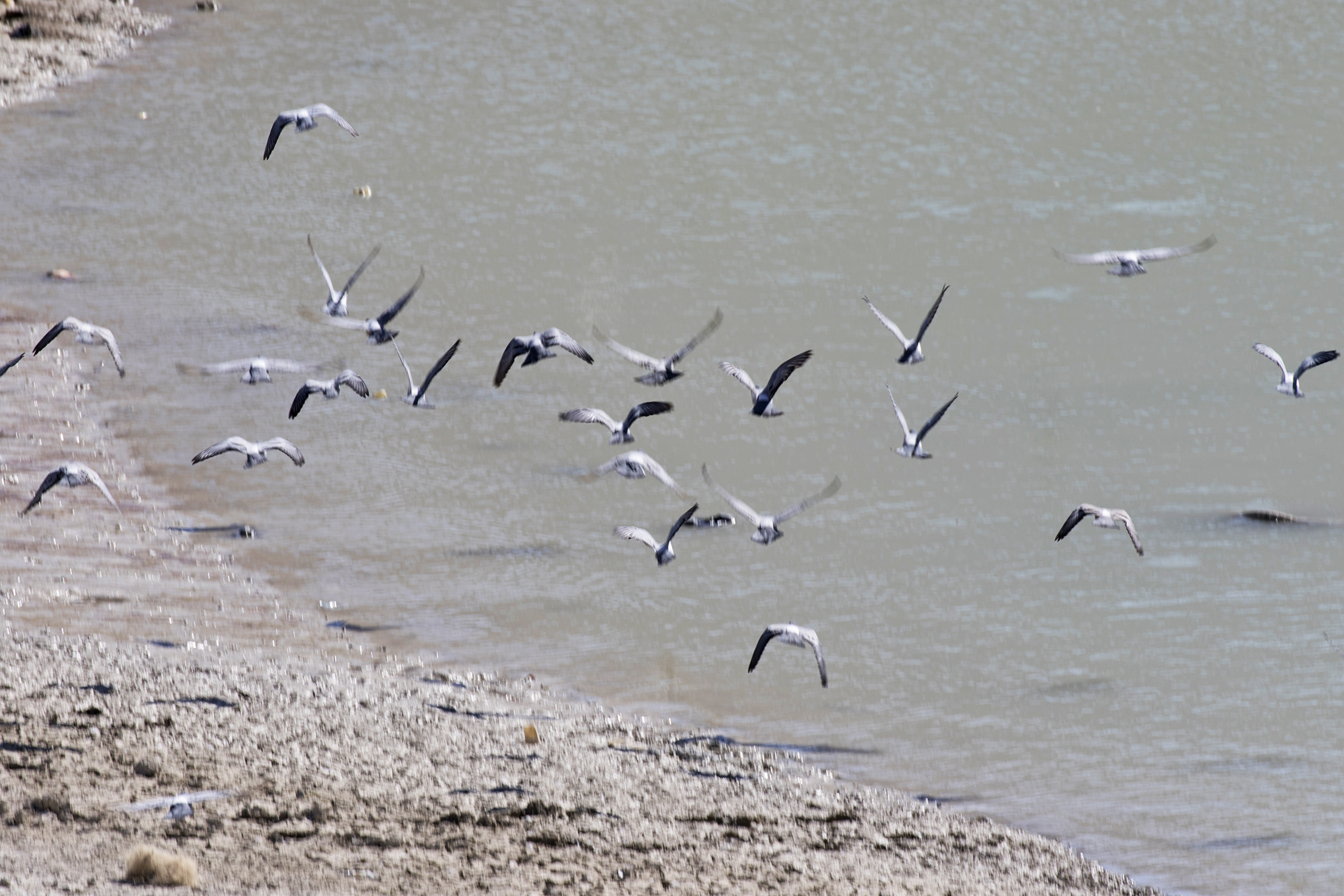
A flock of rock doves flying, Turgut Özal Nature Park, Malatya

Pigeons are often found in pairs in the breeding season, but are often gregarious, living in flocks of 50 to 500 birds (dependent on the food supply). As prey birds, they must keep their vigilance, and when disturbed a pigeon within a flock will take off with a noisy clapping sound that cues for other pigeons to take to flight. The noise of the take-off increases the faster a pigeon beats its wings, thus advertising the magnitude of a perceived threat to its flockmates.

Non-vocal sounds include a loud flapping noise at take-off, feet stamping, hisses, and beak snapping. Wings may also be clapped during flights, usually during display fights or after copulation. Juveniles particularly snap their bills, usually to respond to nest invasion. The foot stomping appears deliberate, though for what purpose is unclear. Foot stamping is done with a certain foot first, showing that rock doves have "footedness", similar to human handedness.

=== Life cycle ===
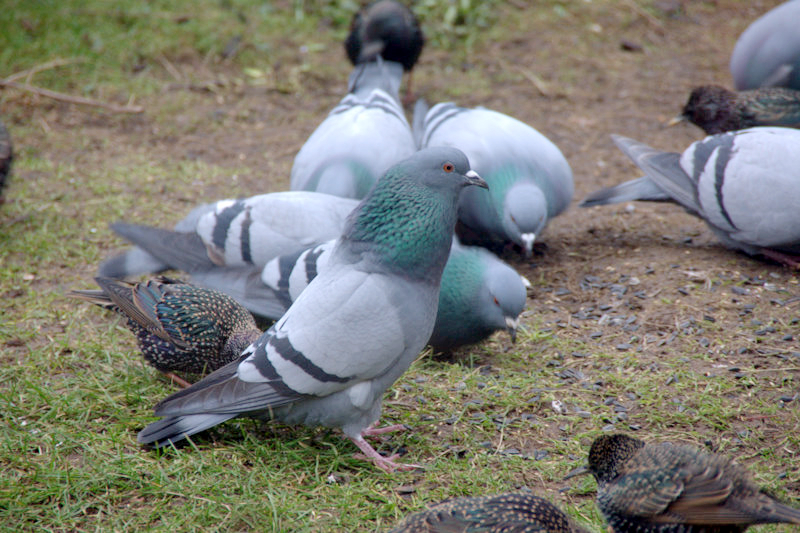
Group of wild birds in Shetland, Scotland, with common starlings. The focal individual is performing a courtship display

The species can breed at any time of the year due to their ability to produce crop milk, but peak times are spring and summer, when the food supply is abundant enough to support embryonic egg development. Laying of eggs can take place up to six times per year. Nesting sites are along coastal and mountain cliff faces and caves.

Courtship rituals of ferals are often observed in urban parks at any time of the year, and it is presumed that the wild populations have similar displays. Alighted males inflate their crops, puffing up the feathers on his neck to appear larger and thereby impress or attract attention (as seen in the header image). He approaches the female at a rapid walking pace while emitting repetitive quiet notes, often bowing and turning as he comes closer. At first, the female invariably walks or flies a short distance away and the male follows her until she stops. At this point, he continues the bowing motion and very often makes full- or half-pirouettes in front of the female. The male then proceeds to feed the female by regurgitating food, as they do when feeding the young. The male then mounts the female, rearing backwards to be able to join their cloacae. The mating is very brief, with the male flapping his wings to maintain balance on top of the female.

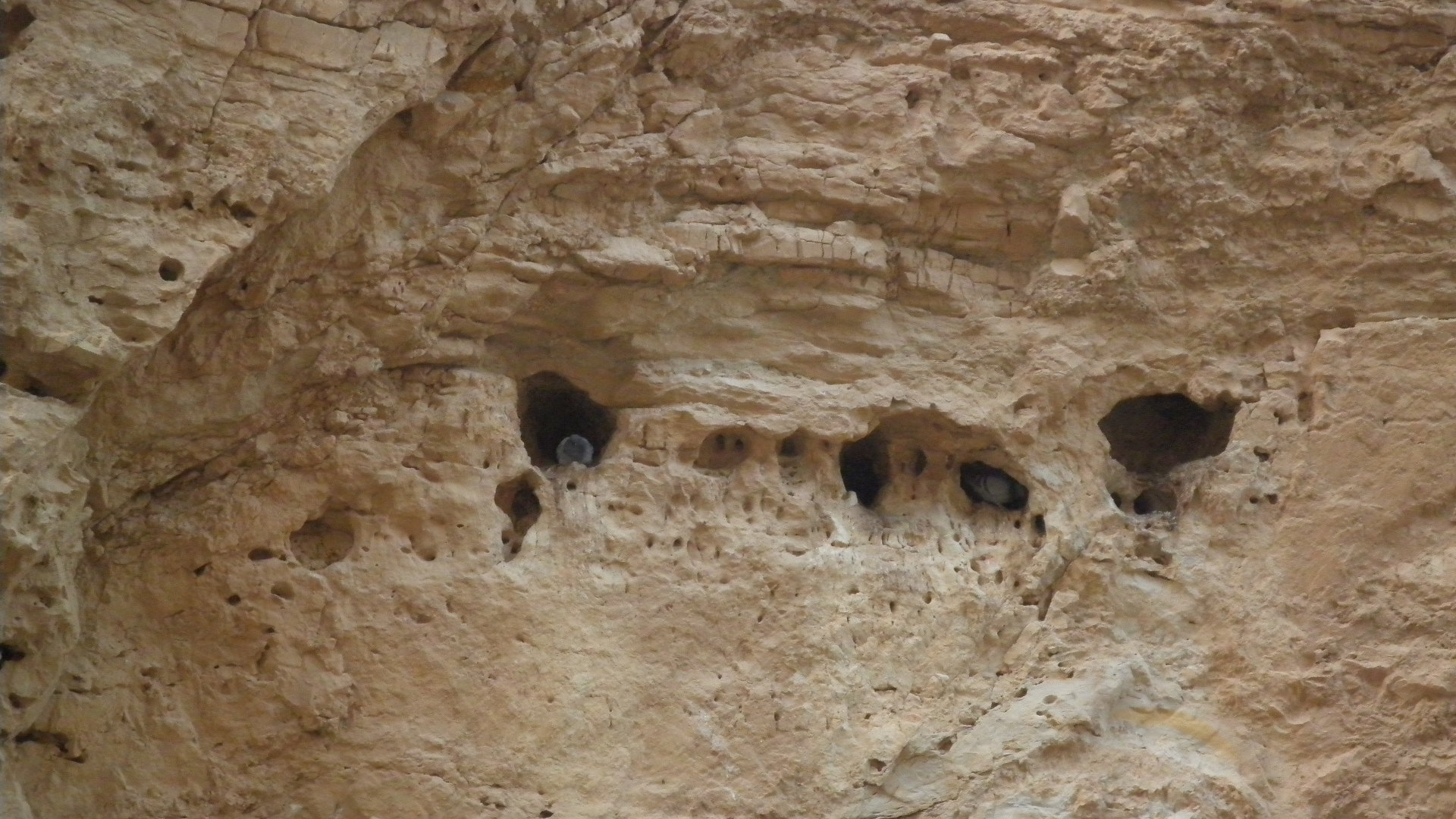
Pigeons nesting in outcrop nooks

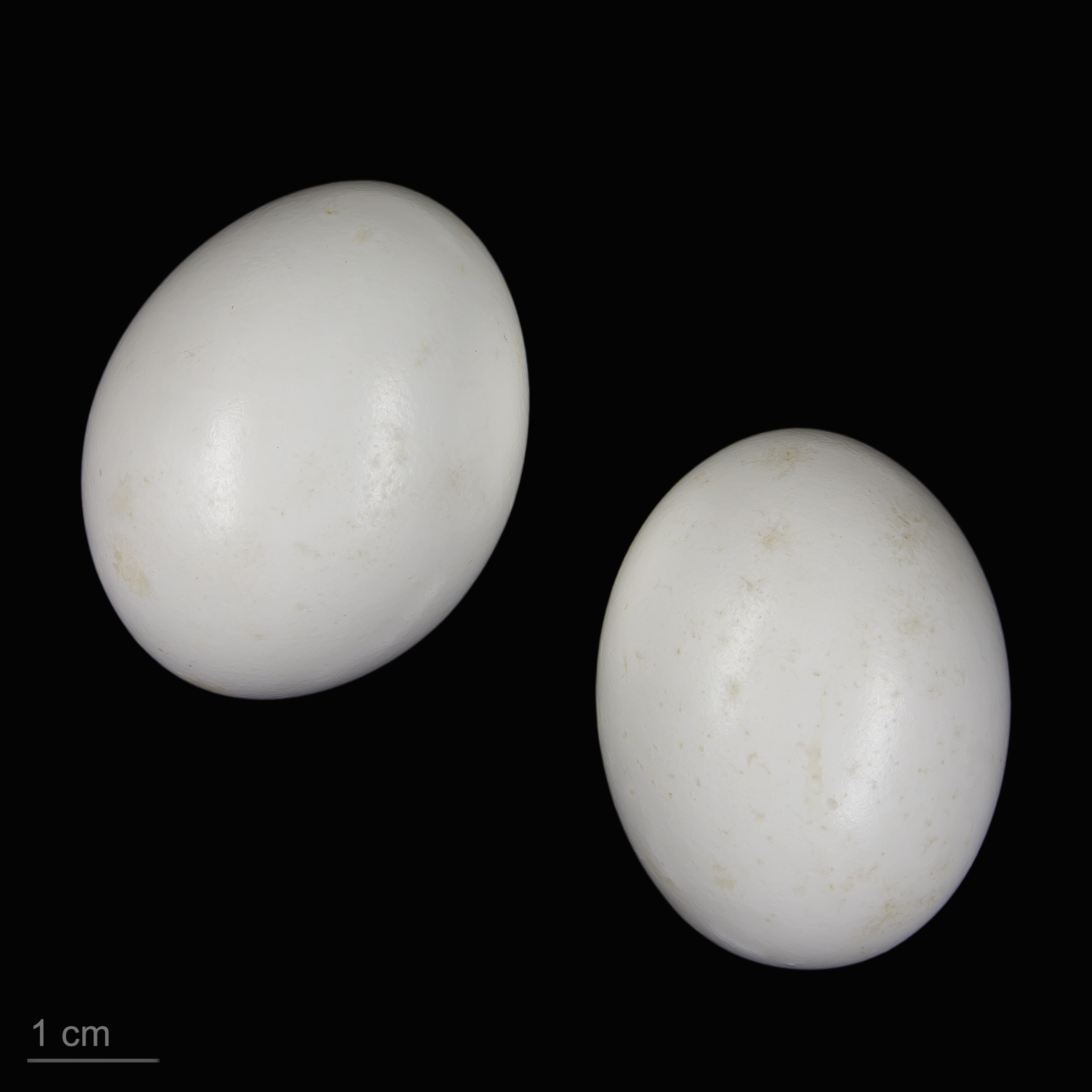
Two rock dove eggs; MHNT

The rock dove is generally monogamous, with two squabs (young) per brood. Both parents care for the young for a time. Current evidence suggests that wild, domestic and feral pigeons mate for life, although their long-term bonds are not unbreakable. They are socially monogamous, but extra-pair matings do occur, often initiated by males.

The nest is a flimsy platform of straw and sticks, laid on a ledge, under cover. Two white eggs are laid; incubation, shared by both parents, lasts 17 to 19 days. The newly hatched squab(s) (nestling) has pale yellow down and a flesh-coloured bill with a dark band. For the first few days, the chicks are tended and fed (through regurgitation) exclusively on crop milk (also called "pigeon milk" or "pigeon's milk"). The pigeon milk is produced in the crops of both parents in all species of pigeon and dove. Pigeons are altricial and their fledging period is about 30 days.

A rock dove's lifespan ranges from 3–5 years in the wild to 15 years in captivity, though longer-lived specimens have been reported. The main causes of mortality in the wild are predators and persecution by humans.

=== Feeding ===
Rock doves are omnivorous, but prefer plant matter: chiefly fruit and grains.

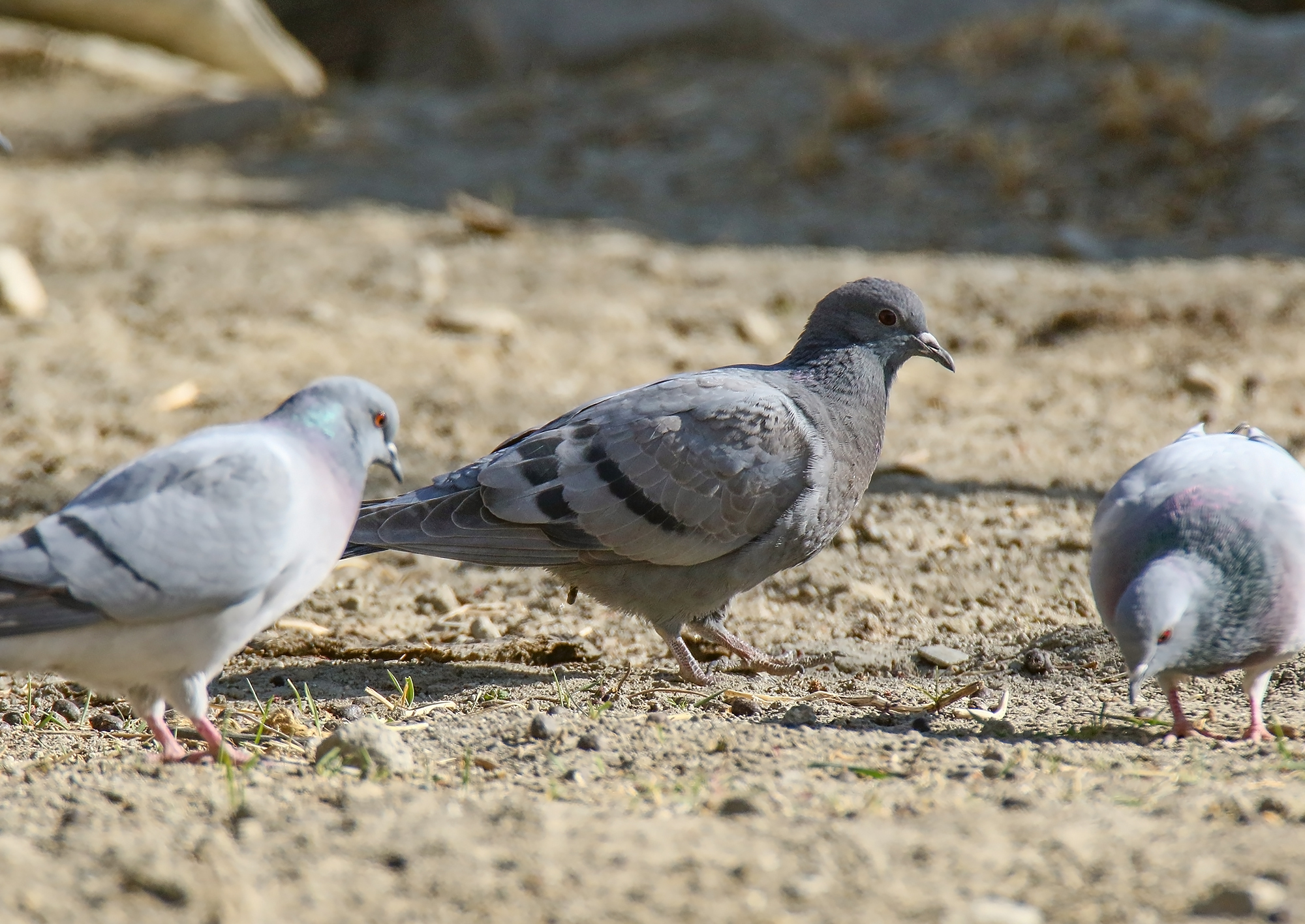
A rock dove foraging with hill pigeons (Columba rupestris)

Pigeons feed on the ground in flocks or individually. Pigeon groups typically consist of "producers", which scout out food sources, and "scroungers", which follow the producers and feed on food located by them. Generally, groups of pigeons contain a greater proportion of scroungers than producers. Pigeons are naturally granivorous, eating seeds that fit down their gullet. They may sometimes consume small invertebrates such as worms or insect larvae as a protein supplement. While most birds take small sips and tilt their heads backwards when drinking, pigeons are able to dip their bills into the water and drink continuously, without having to tilt their heads back.

=== Preening ===
Pigeons primarily use powder down feathers for preening, which gives a soft and silky feel to their plumage. They have no preen gland or at times have very rudimentary preen glands, so oil is not used for preening. Rather, powder down feathers are spread across the body. These have a tendency to disintegrate, and the powder, akin to talcum powder, helps maintain the plumage.

=== Predators ===
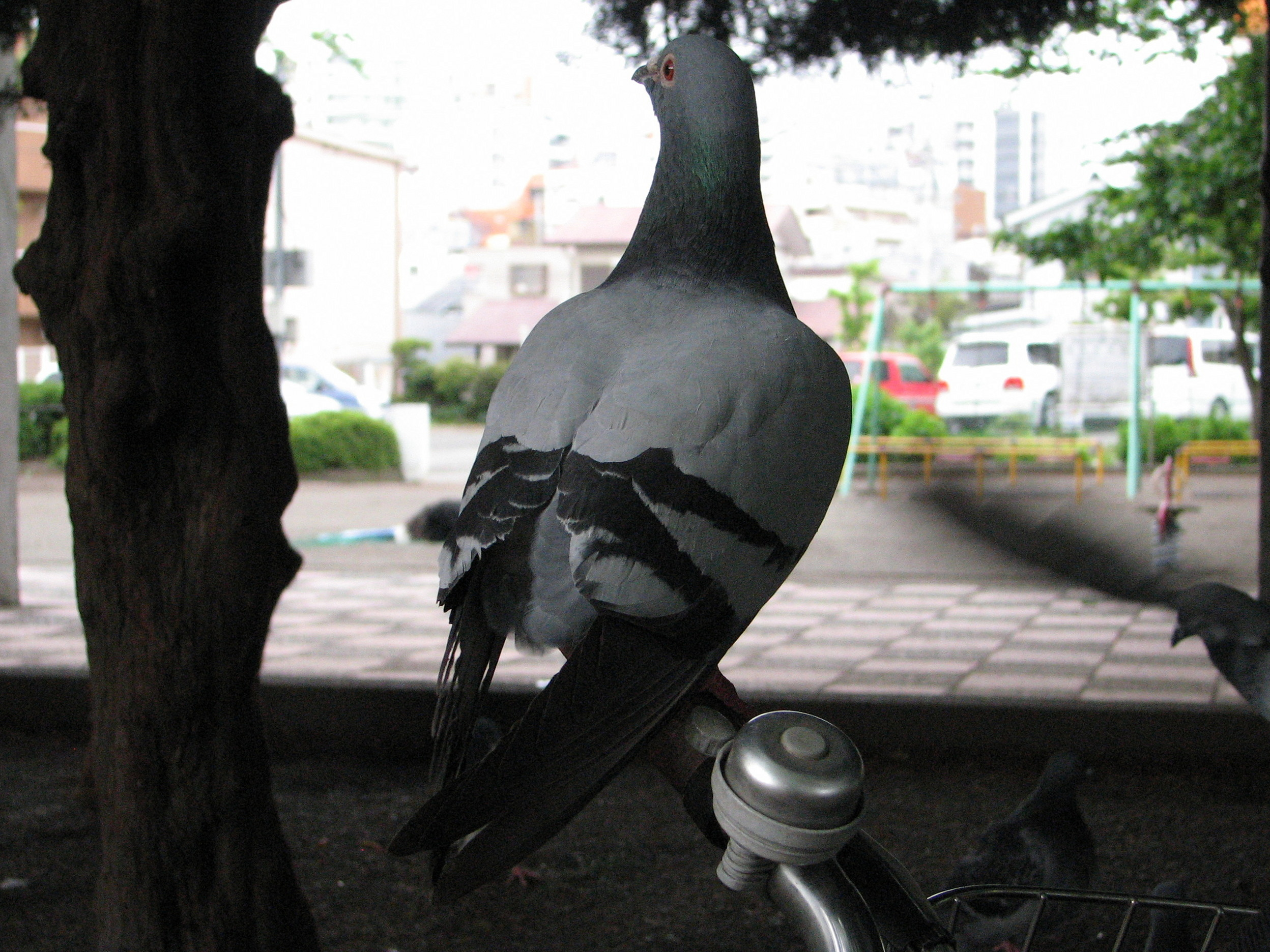
A feral pigeon with entirely missing tail feathers

With only their flying abilities protecting them from predation, rock doves are a favoured prey item for a wide range of raptors. Peregrine falcons are significant natural predators of rock doves and quite adept at catching and feeding upon this species. Doves and pigeons in general are considered to be game birds, since many species are hunted and used for food in many of the countries in which they are native.

Their body feathers have dense, fluffy bases and are loosely attached to the skin, hence they drop out easily. When a predator catches a pigeon, large numbers of feathers are often pulled by the attacker's mouth and the pigeon may use this temporary distraction to make an escape. Tail feathers are also dropped when preyed upon or under traumatic conditions, probably as a distraction mechanism.

== Relationship to humans ==
The rock dove was central to Charles Darwin's discovery of evolution, and featured in four of his works from 1859 to 1872. Darwin posited that, despite wide-ranging morphological differences, the many hundreds of breeds of domestic pigeon could all be traced back to the wild rock dove; in essence human selection of pigeon breeds was analogous to natural selection.

A flock of rock doves eating grains in New Delhi, India. Humans often engage in bird feeding, providing rock doves with grains or breadcrumbs.

Rock doves often have a commensal relationship with humans, gaining both ample access to food and nesting spots in inhabited areas. Human structures provide an excellent imitation of cliff structures, making rock doves very common around human habitation. Skyscrapers, highway overpasses, farm buildings, abandoned buildings, and other human structures with ample crevices are conducive to rock dove nesting. Thus the modern range of the rock dove is due in large part to humans. Agricultural settlements are favoured over forested ones. Ideal human nesting attributes combine areas with tall buildings, green spaces, ample access to human food, and schools. Conversely, suburban areas which are far from city centers and have high street density are the least conducive to pigeons. Their versatility among human structures is evidenced by a population living inside a deep well in Tunisia.

=== Domestication ===
Rock doves have been domesticated for several thousand years, giving rise to the domestic pigeon. They may have been domesticated as long as 5,000 years ago. Domesticated pigeons are used as homing pigeons as well as food and pets. They were in the past also used as carrier pigeons, used to deliver messages in peacetime or during war. Numerous breeds of fancy pigeons of all sizes, forms, and colours have been bred.

Feral pigeons (sometimes given the invalid names "Columba livia domestica" or "Columba livia forma urbana"), also called city doves, city pigeons, or street pigeons, are descendants of domestic pigeons living independently and often unwanted by humans. They are often described as a public nuisance, being a potential reservoir of disease and cause of property damage.
