= Coenia =

Scientific classification
- Kingdom: Animalia
- Phylum: Arthropoda
- Class: Insecta
- Order: Diptera
- Family: Ephydridae
- Subfamily: Ephydrinae
- Tribe: Scatellini
- Genus: Coenia; Robineau-Desvoidy, 1830

Synonyms
- Caenia Walker, 1853

Genus of flies

Coenia is a genus of shore flies in the family Ephydridae.

== Species ==
- C. alpina Mathis, 1975
- C. caucasica Krivosheina, 2001
- C. curvicauda (Meigen, 1830)
- C. deserta Krivosheina, 2001
- C. elbergi Dahl, 1974
- C. palustris (Fallén, 1823)
