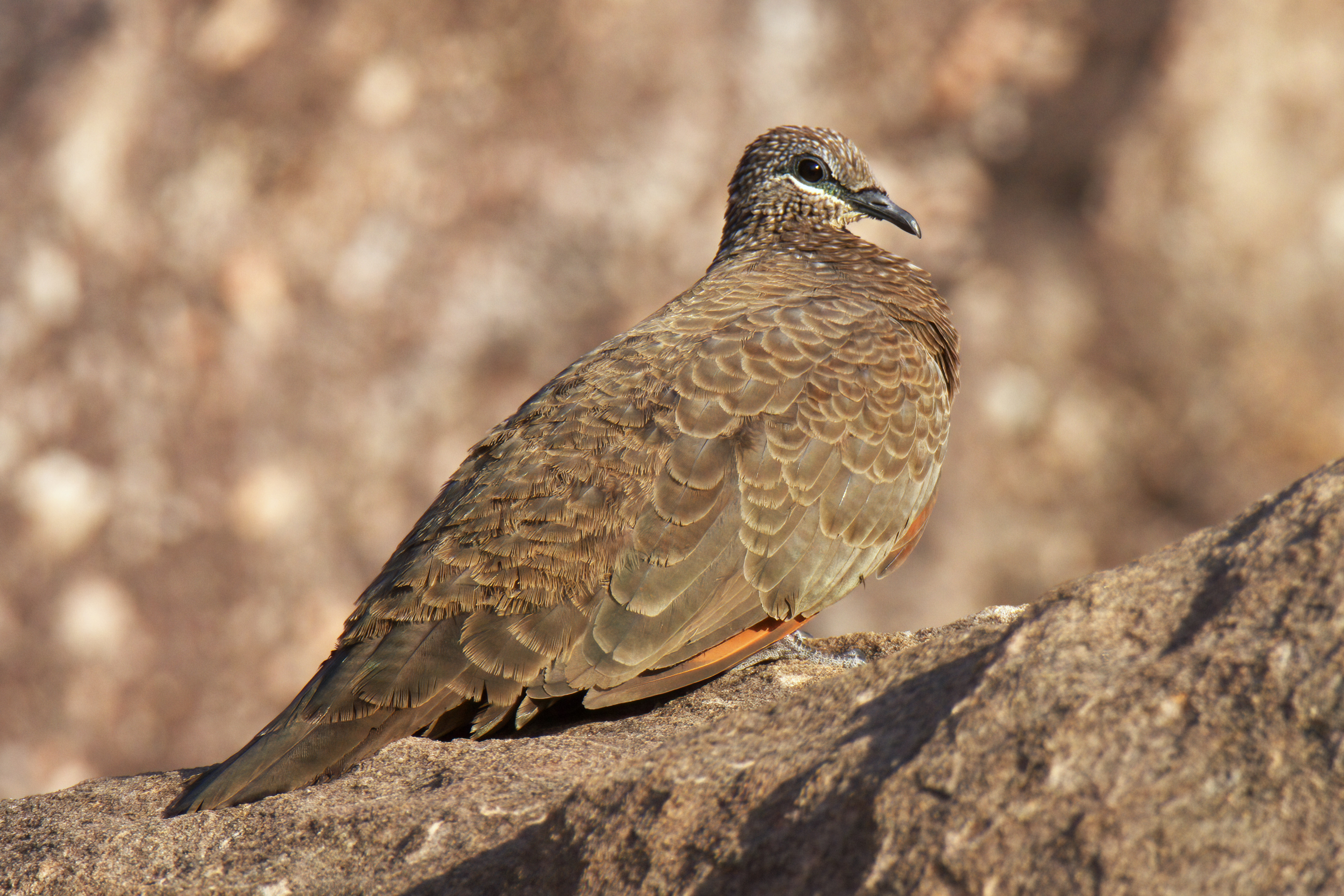
- Petrophassa rufipennis

Scientific classification
- Kingdom: Animalia
- Phylum: Chordata
- Class: Aves
- Order: Columbiformes
- Family: Columbidae
- Tribe: Phabini
- Genus: Petrophassa; Gould, 1841

Type species
- Petrophassa albipennis Gould, 1841

Species
- See text

= Petrophassa =

Genus of birds

Petrophassa, commonly known as the rock pigeons, is a small genus of doves in the family Columbidae native to Australia, and similar to bronzewing pigeons.

The genus was introduced in 1841 by the English ornithologist and bird artist John Gould with the white-quilled rock pigeon (Petrophassa albipennis) as the type species. The genus name is a portmanteau of the Ancient Greek words petros, meaning "rock", and phassa, meaning "pigeon".

The genus contains two species:

Genus Petrophassa – Gould, 1841 – two species
Common name	Scientific name and subspecies	Range	Size and ecology	IUCN status and estimated population
Chestnut-quilled rock pigeon	Petrophassa rufipennis Collett, 1898	Northern Territory of Australia.	Size: Habitat: Diet:	LC
White-quilled rock pigeon	Petrophassa albipennis Gould, 1841 Two subspecies: P. a. albipennis Gould, 1841; P. a. boothi Goodwin, 1969	Australia	Size: Habitat: Diet:	LC

They are not closely related to Columba livia, the rock dove (also called rock pigeon), a species which includes the domestic and feral pigeons as well as the wild species native to Europe, North Africa and Asia.
