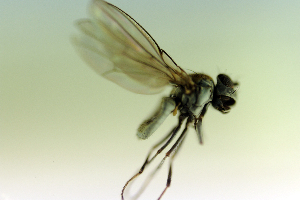
- Scatella paludum

Scientific classification
- Domain: Eukaryota
- Kingdom: Animalia
- Phylum: Arthropoda
- Class: Insecta
- Order: Diptera
- Family: Ephydridae
- Subfamily: Ephydrinae
- Tribe: Scatellini
- Genus: Scatella; Robineau-Desvoidy, 1830

Diversity
- at least 140 species

= Scatella =

Genus of flies

Scatella is a genus of shore flies in the family Ephydridae. There are at least 140 described species in Scatella.

== See also ==
- List of Scatella species
