= Jizz (birding) =

Overall impression or appearance of a bird

Jizz or giss is the overall impression or appearance of a bird garnered from such features as shape, posture, flying style or other habitual movements, size and colouration combined with voice, habitat and location. The concept was popularised in birdwatching, but is so useful that it has since been adopted increasingly widely by field biologists in referring to the impression of the general characteristics of other animals. It similarly appears in such fields of observational biology as microscopy. Ecologists and botanists may speak of "habitat jizz" or the jizz of a plant.

Sean Dooley described jizz as "the indefinable quality of a particular species, the 'vibe' it gives off" and notes that although it is "dismissed by many as some kind of birding alchemy, there is some physical basis to the idea of jizz."

Experienced birders can often make reliable identifications in the field at a glance by using jizz. Often jizz is useful for identifying to the family or genus level, rather than the species level, as in: "It definitely had the jizz of a thrush, but I couldn't see what kind."

== Etymology ==
The term was first used in print in this context in 1922, in the ornithologist Thomas Coward's "Country Diary" column for The Manchester Guardian of 6 December 1921; the piece was subsequently included in his 1922 book Bird Haunts and Nature Memories. He attributed it to "a west-coast Irishman", and explained:

If we are walking on the road and see, far ahead, someone whom we recognise although we can neither distinguish features nor particular clothes, we may be certain that we are not mistaken; there is something in the carriage, the walk, the general appearance which is familiar; it is, in fact, the individual's jizz.

The ornithologist Jeremy Greenwood concludes that the meaning was further popularised by its use by Miss E. I. Turner, "a popular author", in the journal Open Air in 1923.

In a 2016 paper, David McDonald proposes that the word is identical with jizz meaning semen, and that it is the meaning of the word which has changed over the decades rather than its form, with the original sense of "energy" evolving to both semen and the birding sense in different sociolects, as well as the word jazz.

There is a theory that it comes from the World War II RAF acronym GISS for "General Impression of Size and Shape (of an aircraft)", but the use of the term in the 1920s precludes that. Another theory is that jizz is a corruption of gestalt, a German word that roughly means form or shape. Other possibilities include the word gist, or a contraction of just is. These theories were debunked by McDonald and, independently, by Greenwood and his brother Julian in 2018.
