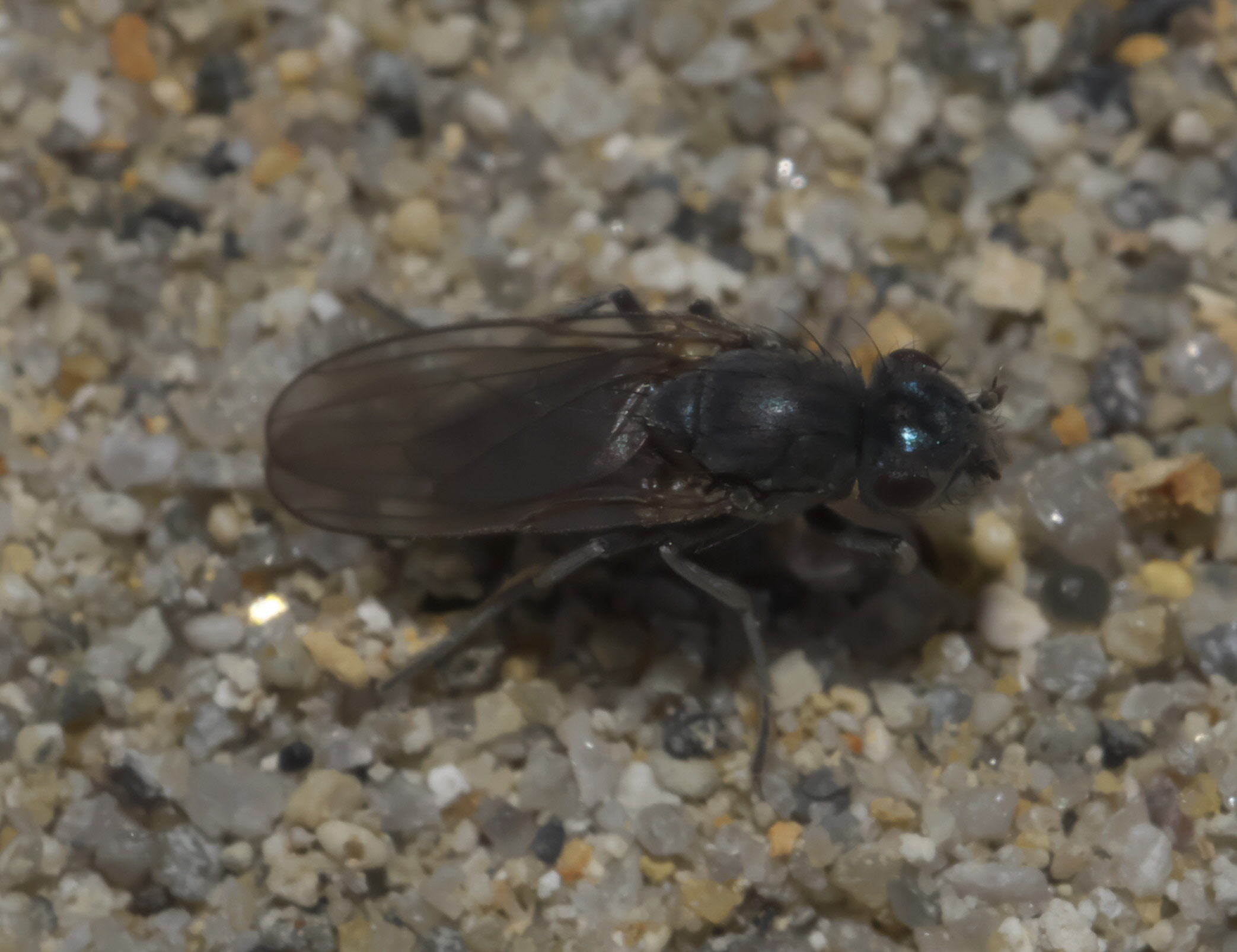
- Ephydra hians

Scientific classification
- Kingdom: Animalia
- Phylum: Arthropoda
- Clade: Pancrustacea
- Class: Insecta
- Order: Diptera
- Family: Ephydridae
- Subfamily: Ephydrinae; Zetterstedt, 1837

= Ephydrinae =

Subfamily of flies

Ephydrinae is a subfamily of shore flies in the family Ephydridae.

== Genera ==
Tribe Ephydrini Zetterstedt, 1837

- Austrocoenia Wirth, 1970
- Cirrula Cresson, 1915
- Dimecoenia Cresson, 1916
- Ephydra Fallén, 1810
- Neoephydra Mathis 2008
- Notiocoenia Mathis, 1980
- Paraephydra Mathis 2008
- Setacera Cresson, 1930

Tribe Scatellini Wirth & Stone, 1956

- Brachydeutera Loew, 1860
- Coenia Robineau-Desvoidy, 1830
- Apulvillus Malloch, 1935
- Haloscatella Mathis, 1979
- Lamproscatella Hendel, 1917
- Limnellia Malloch, 1925
- Philotelma Becker, 1896
- Paracoenia Cresson, 1935
- Scatella Robineau-Desvoidy, 1830

- Neoscatella Malloch, 1933
- Scatella Robineau-Desvoidy, 1830

- Scatophila Becker, 1896
- Teichomyza Macquart, 1835

Tribe Parydrini Wirth & Stone, 1956

- Parydra Stenhammer, 1844
- Eutaenionotum Oldenberg, 1923

Tribe Dagini Mathis, 1982

- Diedrops Mathis & Wirth, 1976
- Physemops Cresson, 1934
- Dagus Cresson, 1935
- Psilephydra Hendel, 1914

unplaced

- Calocoenia
