= List of Ephydridae genera =

This is a list of 144 genera in the family Ephydridae, shore flies.

== Ephydridae genera ==
- Achaetorisa Papp, 1980^{c g}
- Actocetor Becker, 1903
- Allotrichoma Becker, 1896^{i c g b}
- Amalopteryx Eaton, 1875
- Apulvillus Malloch, 1934
- Asmeringa Becker, 1903
- Athyroglossa Loew, 1860
- Atissa Haliday, 1837
- Austrocoenia Wirth, 1970
- Axysta Haliday, 1837
- Beckeriella Williston, 1897
- Brachydeutera Loew, 1862
- Callinapaea Sturtevant & Wheeler, 1954
- Calocoenia Mathis, 1975
- Cavatorella Deonier, 1995
- Centromeromyia Frey, 1958
- Cerobothrium Frey, 1958
- Cerometopum Cresson, 1914^{c g}
- Ceropsilopa Cresson, 1917
- Chaetomosillus Hendel, 1934^{c g}
- Chlorichaeta Becker, 1922^{i c g}
- Cirrula Cresson, 1915
- Clanoneurum Becker, 1903
- Clasiopella Hendel, 1914
- Cnestrum Becker, 1896^{c g}
- Coenia Robineau-Desvoidy, 1830
- Cressonomyia Arnaud, 1958^{i c g b}
- Dagus Cresson, 1935^{c g}
- Dichaeta Meigen, 1830
- Diclasiopa Hendel, 1917^{i c g}
- Diedrops Mathis & Wirth, 1976
- Dimecoenia Cresson, 1916
- Diphuia Cresson, 1944
- Discocerina Macquart, 1835
- Discomyza Meigen, 1830
- Ditrichophora Cresson, 1924^{i c g}
- Donaceus Cresson, 1943
- Dryxella Krivosheina, 2013
- Dryxo Robineau-Desvoidy, 1830
- Eleleides Cresson, 1948^{c g}
- Elephantinosoma Becker, 1903
- Ephydra Fallén, 1810
- Ephydrella Tonnoir & Malloch, 1926
- Eremomusca Mathis, 1985^{c g}
- Eremotrichoma Giordani Soika, 1956^{c g}
- Eutaenionotum Oldenberg, 1923^{i c g}
- Facitrichophora Mathis & Zatwarnicki, 2012^{g}
- Galaterina Zatwarnicki & Mathis, 2001^{c g}
- Garifuna Mathis, 1997
- Gastrops Williston, 1897
- Glenanthe Haliday, 1837
- Guttipsilopa Wirth, 1956
- Gymnoclasiopa Hendel, 1930^{g}
- Gymnopiella Cresson, 1945^{c g}
- Halmopota Haliday, 1856^{c g}
- Haloscatella Mathis, 1979^{g}
- Hecamede Haliday in Curtis, 1837
- Hecamedoides Hendel, 1917^{i c g}
- Helaeomyia Cresson, 1941
- Homalometopus Becker, 1903
- Hoploaegis Cresson, 1944
- Hostis Cresson^{i c g}
- Hyadina Haliday, 1837
- Hydrellia Robineau-Desvoidy, 1830
- Hydrochasma ^{i c g}
- Ilythea Haliday, 1837
- Isgamera Soika, 1956
- Karema Cresson, 1929
- Lamproclasiopa Hendel, 1933
- Lamproscatella Hendel, 1917^{i c g}
- Lemnaphila Cresson, 1933 (duckweed miner flies)
- Leptopsilopa Cresson, 1922
- Limnellia Malloch, 1925
- Lipochaeta Coquillett, 1896^{i c g}
- Lytogaster Becker, 1896^{i c g}
- Microlytogaster Cresson, 1924^{i c g}
- Mosillus Latreille, 1804
- Nannodastia Hendel^{i c g}
- Neoephydra Mathis 2008
- Neoscatella Malloch, 1933^{i g}
- Nesopsilopa Mathis & Wirth, 1977^{g}
- Nostima Coquillett, 1900
- Notiocoenia Mathis, 1980
- Notiphila Fallén, 1810
- Ochthera Latreille, 1802
- Oedenopiforma Cogan, 1968^{c g}
- Oedenops Becker, 1903
- Omyxa Mathis & Zatwarnicki, 2002
- Orasiopa ^{c g}
- Papuama Mathis & Zatwarnicki, 2002^{c g}
- Paracoenia Cresson, 1935^{i c g}
- Paraephydra Mathis 2008
- Paraglenanthe ^{c g}
- Parahyadina Tonnoir & Malloch, 1926
- Paralimna Loew, 1862
- Paratissa Coquillett, 1900
- Parydra Stenhammar, 1844
- Parydroptera Collin, 1913
- Pectinifer Cresson, 1944
- Pelignellus Sturtevant & Wheeler, 1954
- Pelina Haliday, 1837
- Pelinoides Cresson, 1931
- Peltopsilopa ^{c g}
- Philotelma Becker, 1896^{i c g}
- Philygria Stenhammar, 1844
- Physemops Cresson, 1934
- Placopsidella Kertész, 1901
- Platygymnopa Wirth, 1971
- Poecilostenia Bezzi, 1908^{g}
- Polytrichophora Cresson, 1924^{i c g}
- Pseudohecamede Hendel^{g}
- Pseudohyadina ^{i c g}
- Pseudopelina ^{c g}
- Psilephydra Hendel, 1914
- Psilopa Fallén, 1823
- Psilopoidea Cresson, 1939^{c g}
- Ptilomyia Coquillett, 1900
- Rhinonapaea ^{i c g}
- Rhychopsilopa ^{g}
- Rhynchopsilopa Hendel, 1913^{c g}
- Rhysophora ^{i c g}
- Risa Becker, 1907^{c g}
- Saphaea ^{c g}
- Scatella Robineau-Desvoidy, 1830
- Scatophila Becker, 1896^{i c g b}
- Schema Becker, 1907^{i c g}
- Scoliocephalus Becker, 1903
- Scotimyza ^{c g}
- Setacera Cresson, 1930^{i c g b}
- Sinops ^{c g}
- Stratiothyrea Meijere, 1913
- Subpelignus Papp, 1983^{c g}
- Tauromima ^{c g}
- Teichomyza Macquart, 1835
- Thinoscatella Mathis, 1979^{g}
- Thiomyia Wirth, 1954
- Trimerina Macquart, 1835
- Trimerinoides ^{i c g}
- Trimerogaster ^{g}
- Trimerogastra Hendel, 1914
- Trypetomima ^{c g}
- Typopsilopa Cresson, 1916
- Zeros Cresson, 1943

Data sources: i = ITIS, c = Catalogue of Life, g = GBIF, b = Bugguide.net
