= List of Notiphila species =

This is a list of 163 species in Notiphila, a genus of shore flies in the family Ephydridae.

== Notiphila species ==
- N. abdita Cogan, 1968
- N. adusta Mathis, 1979
- N. aenea Waltl, 1837
- N. affinis Waltl, 1837
- N. albiventris (Wiedemann, 1824)
- N. alboclavata Bigot, 1888
- N. ambata Cogan, 1968
- N. ancudensis Cresson, 1931
- N. andrana Cogan, 1968
- N. annulata Fallén, 1813
- N. annulipes Stenhammar, 1844
- N. aquatica Becker, 1896
- N. asiatica Krivosheina, 1998
- N. atrata Mathis, 1979
- N. atripes Cresson, 1917
- N. australis Loew, 1860
- N. avia Loew, 1878
- N. bella Loew, 1862
- N. bicolor Waltl, 1837
- N. bicornuta Bock, 1988
- N. bipunctata Loew, 1862
- N. biseriata Cresson, 1917
- N. bispinosa Cresson, 1917
- N. bivittata Cogan, 1968
- N. brasiliensis Walker, 1856
- N. brunnipes (Robineau-Desvoidy, 1830)
- N. cana Cresson, 1947
- N. canescens Miyagi, 1966
- N. carbonaria Walker, 1865
- N. carinata Loew, 1862
- N. caudata Fallén, 1813
- N. cinerea Fallén, 1813
- N. cogani Canzoneri & Meneghini, 1979
- N. cressoni Mathis, 1979
- N. decorata Williston, 1896
- N. decoris Williston, 1893
- N. deonieri Mathis, 1979
- N. deserta Mathis, 1979
- N. dimidiaticornis Giordani Soika, 1956
- N. dorsata Stenhammar, 1844
- N. dorsopunctata Wiedemann, 1824
- N. eleomyia Mathis, 1979
- N. elophila Mathis, 1979
- N. erythrocera Loew, 1878
- N. exotica Wiedemann, 1830
- N. ezoensis Miyagi, 1966
- N. fasciata (Wiedemann, 1824)
- N. flava Dahl, 1973
- N. flavoantennata Krivosheina, 1998
- N. floridensis Cresson, 1917
- N. footei Mathis, 1979
- N. freyi Krivosheina, 2001
- N. frigidicola Cogan, 1968
- N. frontalis Coquillett, 1904
- N. fulvimana Cresson, 1917
- N. furcata (Coquillett, 1902)
- N. fuscimana Malloch, 1925
- N. fuscofacies Cogan, 1968
- N. graecula Becker, 1926
- N. hamifera Wheeler, 1961
- N. ignobilis Loew, 1862
- N. imperomana Mathis, 1995
- N. impunctata Meijere, 1908
- N. indica Krivosheina, 2001
- N. indistincta Krivosheina, 2001
- N. insularis Grimshaw, 1901
- N. iranica Canzoneri & Meneghini, 1979
- N. irrorata Cogan, 1968
- N. juncea Dahl, 1973
- N. kentensis Huryn, 1987
- N. kenyaensis Cresson, 1947
- N. latelimbata Curran, 1930
- N. latigena Mathis, 1979
- N. latigenis Hendel, 1914
- N. lenae Krivosheina, 1998
- N. lineata Giordani Soika, 1956
- N. littorea Waltl, 1837
- N. loewi Cresson, 1917
- N. lunicornis Giordani Soika, 1956
- N. lyalli Cogan, 1968
- N. lyra Krivosheina, 1998
- N. macrochaeta Loew, 1878
- N. maculata Stenhammar, 1844
- N. major Stenhammar, 1844
- N. maritima Krivosheina, 1998
- N. mathisi Huryn, 1984
- N. meridionalis (Rondani, 1856)
- N. microscopa Cogan, 1968
- N. mima Canzoneri & Meneghini, 1979
- N. minima Cresson, 1917
- N. montalentii Canzoneri & Rampini, 1994
- N. montana Cogan, 1968
- N. nanosoma Mathis, 1979
- N. nigra (Robineau-Desvoidy, 1830)
- N. nigricornis Stenhammar, 1844
- N. nigrina Krivosheina, 2001
- N. nigripes Waltl, 1837
- N. nosata Krivosheina, 2001
- N. nubila Dahl, 1973
- N. nudipes Cresson, 1917
- N. obscuricornis Loew, 1862
- N. oksanae Krivosheina & Ozerov, 2015
- N. olivacea Cresson, 1917
- N. omercooperi Cogan, 1968
- N. oriens Mathis, 1979
- N. pallicornis Mathis, 1979
- N. pallidipalpis Cresson, 1940
- N. paludia Mathis, 1979
- N. pauroura Mathis, 1979
- N. phaea Hendel, 1914
- N. phaeopsis Mathis, 1979
- N. philippinensis Cresson, 1948
- N. picta Fallén, 1813
- N. pokuma Cresson, 1947
- N. poliosoma Mathis, 1979
- N. pollinosa Krivosheina, 1998
- N. posticata Meigen, 1830
- N. pseudobscuricornis Giordani Soika, 1956
- N. pseudodimiaticornis Giordani Soika, 1956
- N. puberula Krivosheina, 2001
- N. pulchra Mathis, 1979
- N. pulchrifrons Loew, 1872
- N. puncta Meijere, 1911
- N. quadrimaculata Dahl, 1973
- N. quadrisetosa Thomson, 1869
- N. riparia Meigen, 1830
- N. robusta Mathis, 1979
- N. rufitarsis Macquart, 1851
- N. scalaris Loew, 1862
- N. scoliochaeta Mathis, 1979
- N. scutellata Krivosheina, 2001
- N. sekiyai Koizumi, 1949
- N. semimaculata Becker, 1926
- N. setigera Becker, 1903
- N. setosa Krivosheina, 2001
- N. shewelli Mathis, 1979
- N. sicca Cresson, 1940
- N. simalurensis Meijere, 1916
- N. similis Meijere, 1908
- N. solita Walker, 1853
- N. spinosa Cresson, 1948
- N. splendens Macquart, 1851
- N. stagnicola (Robineau-Desvoidy, 1830)
- N. sternalis Thomson, 1869
- N. striata Williston, 1897
- N. stuckenbergi Cogan, 1968
- N. subnigra Krivosheina, 1998
- N. supposita Collin, 1911
- N. swarabica Cogan, 1968
- N. taenia Mathis, 1979
- N. teres Cresson, 1931
- N. theonae Huryn, 1984
- N. transversa Walker, 1853
- N. triangulifera Schiner, 1868
- N. tschungseni Canzoneri, 1993
- N. uliginosa Haliday, 1839
- N. umbrosa Drake, 2001
- N. unicolor Loew, 1862
- N. unilineata Walker, 1865
- N. venusta Loew, 1856
- N. virgata Coquillett, 1900
