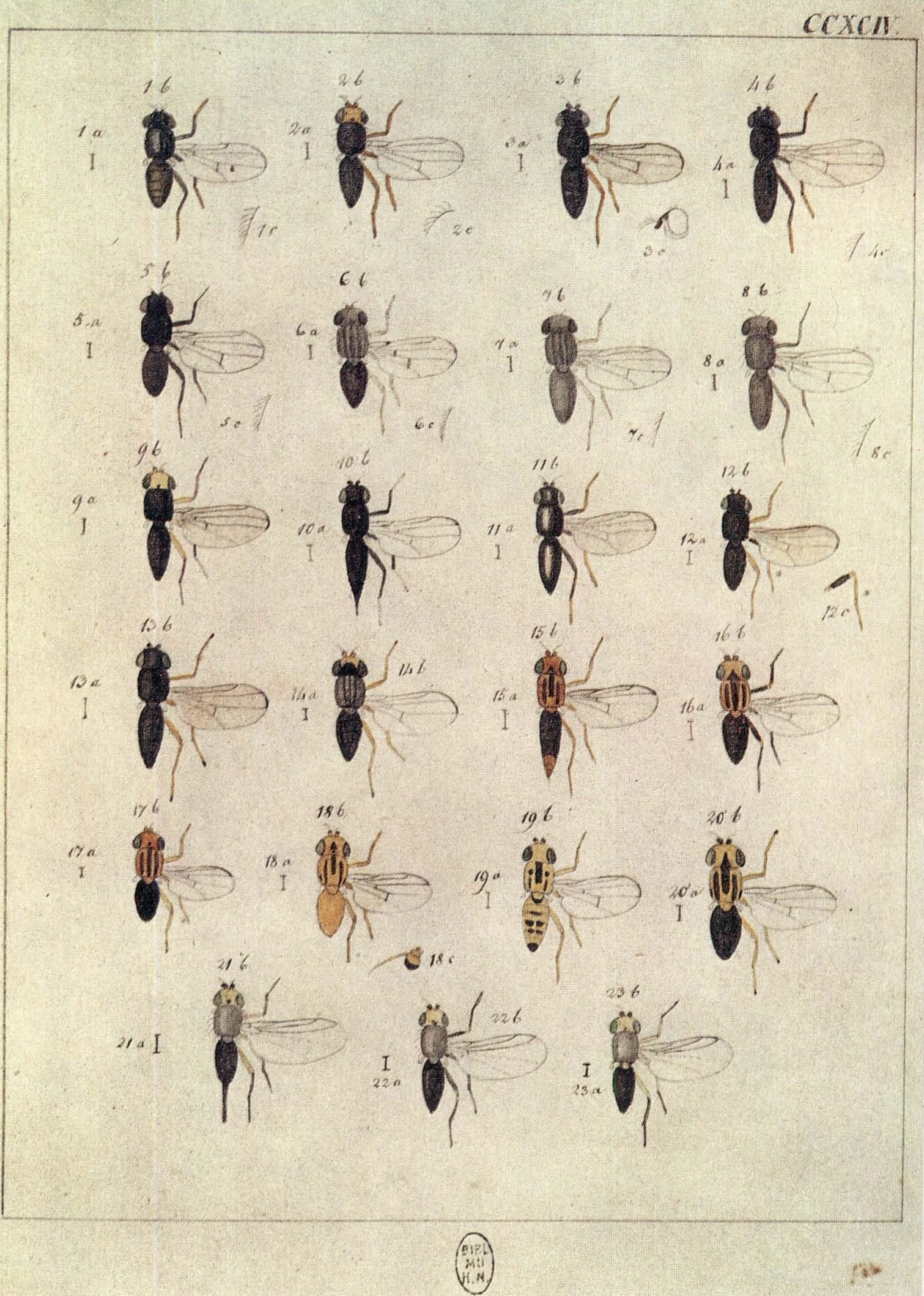
- Notiphila aenea in Europäischen Zweiflügeligen (figure 1)

Scientific classification
- Kingdom: Animalia
- Phylum: Arthropoda
- Class: Insecta
- Order: Diptera
- Family: Ephydridae
- Subfamily: Hydrelliinae
- Tribe: Notiphilini
- Genus: Notiphila
- Species: N. aenea

Binomial name
- Notiphila aenea Waltl, 1837

= Notiphila aenea =

Species of fly

Notiphila aenea is a species of fly in the family Ephydridae. It is found in the Palearctic.
