= Mosillus tibialis =

Scientific classification
- Kingdom: Animalia
- Phylum: Arthropoda
- Class: Insecta
- Order: Diptera
- Family: Ephydridae
- Subfamily: Gymnomyzinae
- Tribe: Gymnomyzini
- Genus: Mosillus
- Species: M. tibialis

Binomial name
- Mosillus tibialis Cresson, 1916

Species of fly

Mosillus tibialis is a species of shore flies in the family Ephydridae.

== Distribution ==
Canada, United States, Bahamas, Mexico, Hawaiian Islands.
