= Lemnaphila scotlandae =

Scientific classification
- Kingdom: Animalia
- Phylum: Arthropoda
- Class: Insecta
- Order: Diptera
- Family: Ephydridae
- Subfamily: Hydrelliinae
- Tribe: Hydrelliini
- Genus: Lemnaphila
- Species: L. scotlandae

Binomial name
- Lemnaphila scotlandae Cresson, 1933

Species of fly

Lemnaphila scotlandae is a species of shore flies in the family Ephydridae. Larvae are leaf-miners of duckweed.

== Distribustion ==
Canada, United States.
