= Mosillus bidentatus =

Scientific classification
- Kingdom: Animalia
- Phylum: Arthropoda
- Class: Insecta
- Order: Diptera
- Family: Ephydridae
- Subfamily: Gymnomyzinae
- Tribe: Gymnomyzini
- Genus: Mosillus
- Species: M. bidentatus

Binomial name
- Mosillus bidentatus (Cresson, 1926)

Synonyms
- Gynmopa bidentatus Cresson, 1926

Species of fly

Mosillus bidentatus is a species of shore flies in the family Ephydridae.

== Distribution ==
Canada, United States.
