= Ochthera cuprilineata =

Scientific classification
- Kingdom: Animalia
- Phylum: Arthropoda
- Class: Insecta
- Order: Diptera
- Family: Ephydridae
- Subfamily: Gymnomyzinae
- Tribe: Ochtherini
- Genus: Ochthera
- Species: O. cuprilineata

Binomial name
- Ochthera cuprilineata Wheeler, 1896

Synonyms
- Ochthera melanderi Cresson, 1944

Species of fly

Ochthera cuprilineata is a species of shore flies in the family Ephydridae.

== Distribution ==
United States, West Indies, Neotropical.
