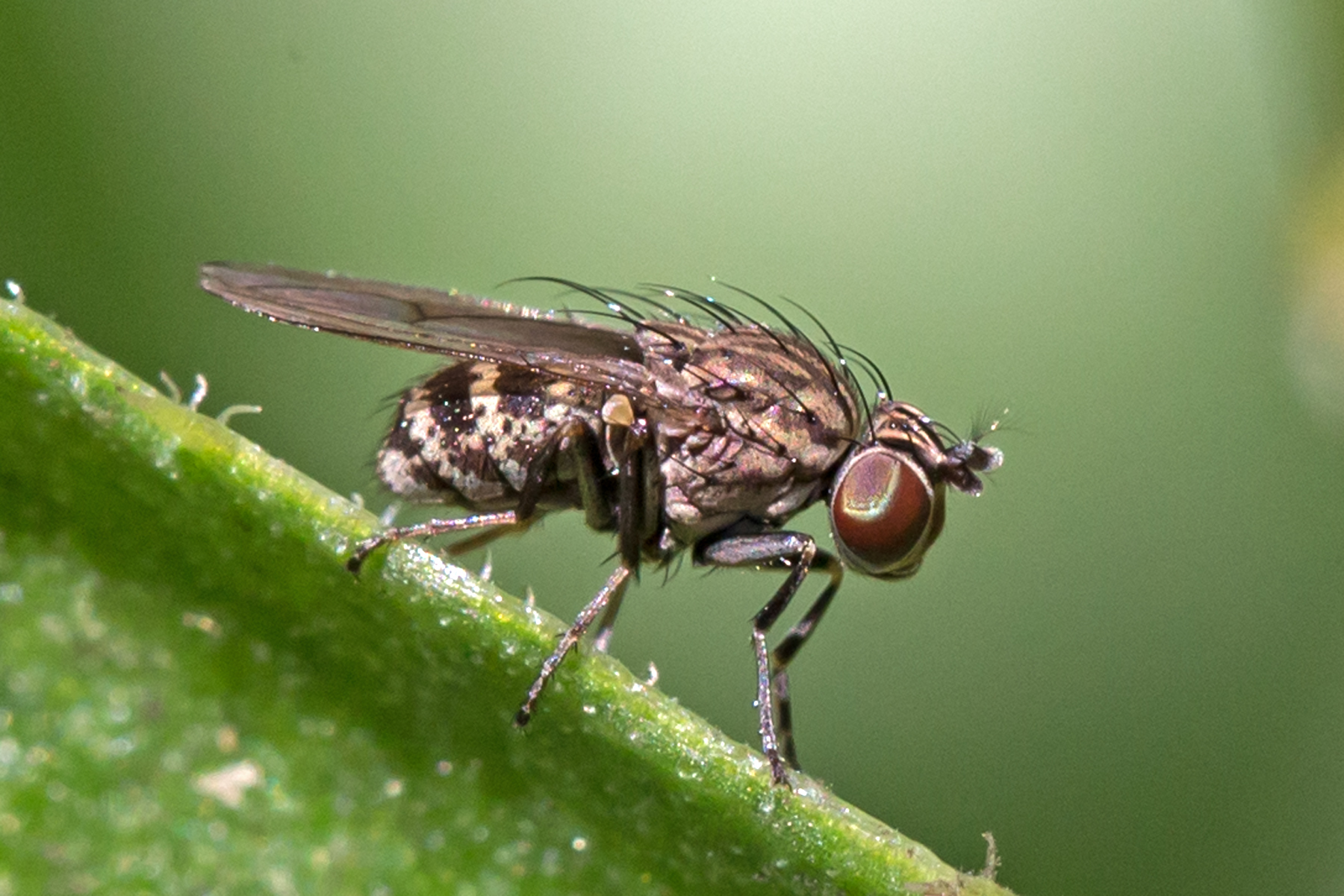

Scientific classification
- Kingdom: Animalia
- Phylum: Arthropoda
- Class: Insecta
- Order: Diptera
- Family: Ephydridae
- Subfamily: Hydrelliinae
- Tribe: Notiphilini
- Genus: Notiphila
- Species: N. pulchrifrons

Binomial name
- Notiphila pulchrifrons Loew, 1872

Synonyms
- Notiphila signata Cresson, 1917

= Notiphila pulchrifrons =

Species of fly

Notiphila pulchrifrons is a species of shore fly in the family Ephydridae.

== Distribution ==
United States, Neotropical.
