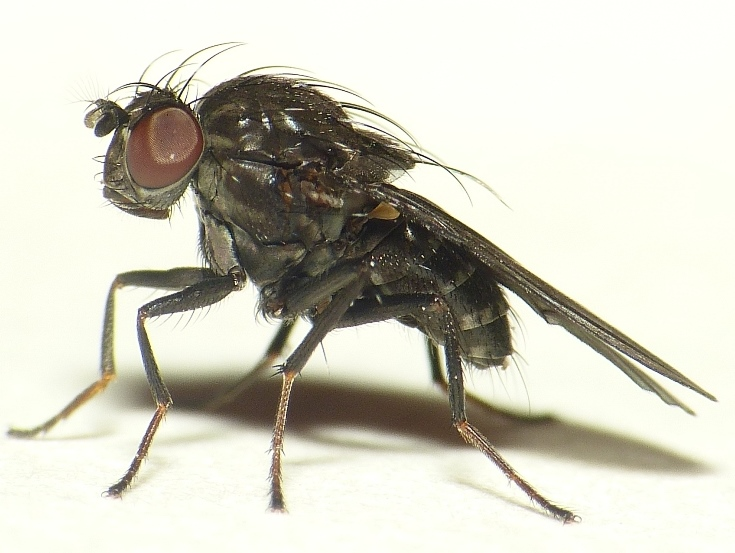
- Dichaeta caudata.jpg

Scientific classification
- Domain: Eukaryota
- Kingdom: Animalia
- Phylum: Arthropoda
- Class: Insecta
- Order: Diptera
- Family: Ephydridae
- Subfamily: Hydrelliinae
- Tribe: Notiphilini
- Genus: Notiphila
- Subgenus: Dichaeta; Meigen, 1830

Synonyms
- Dichoeta Macquart, 1835; Agrolimna Cresson, 1917

= Dichaeta =

Genus of flies

Dichaeta is a subgenus of flies belonging to the family Ephydridae.

== Species ==
- Notiphila caudata (Fallén, 1813)
