= Ochthera tuberculata =

Scientific classification
- Kingdom: Animalia
- Phylum: Arthropoda
- Class: Insecta
- Order: Diptera
- Family: Ephydridae
- Subfamily: Gymnomyzinae
- Tribe: Ochtherini
- Genus: Ochthera
- Species: O. tuberculata

Binomial name
- Ochthera tuberculata Loew, 1862

Synonyms
- Ochthera rapax Loew, 1862

Species of fly

Ochthera tuberculata is a species of shore flies (insects in the family Ephydridae).

== Distribution ==
United States.
