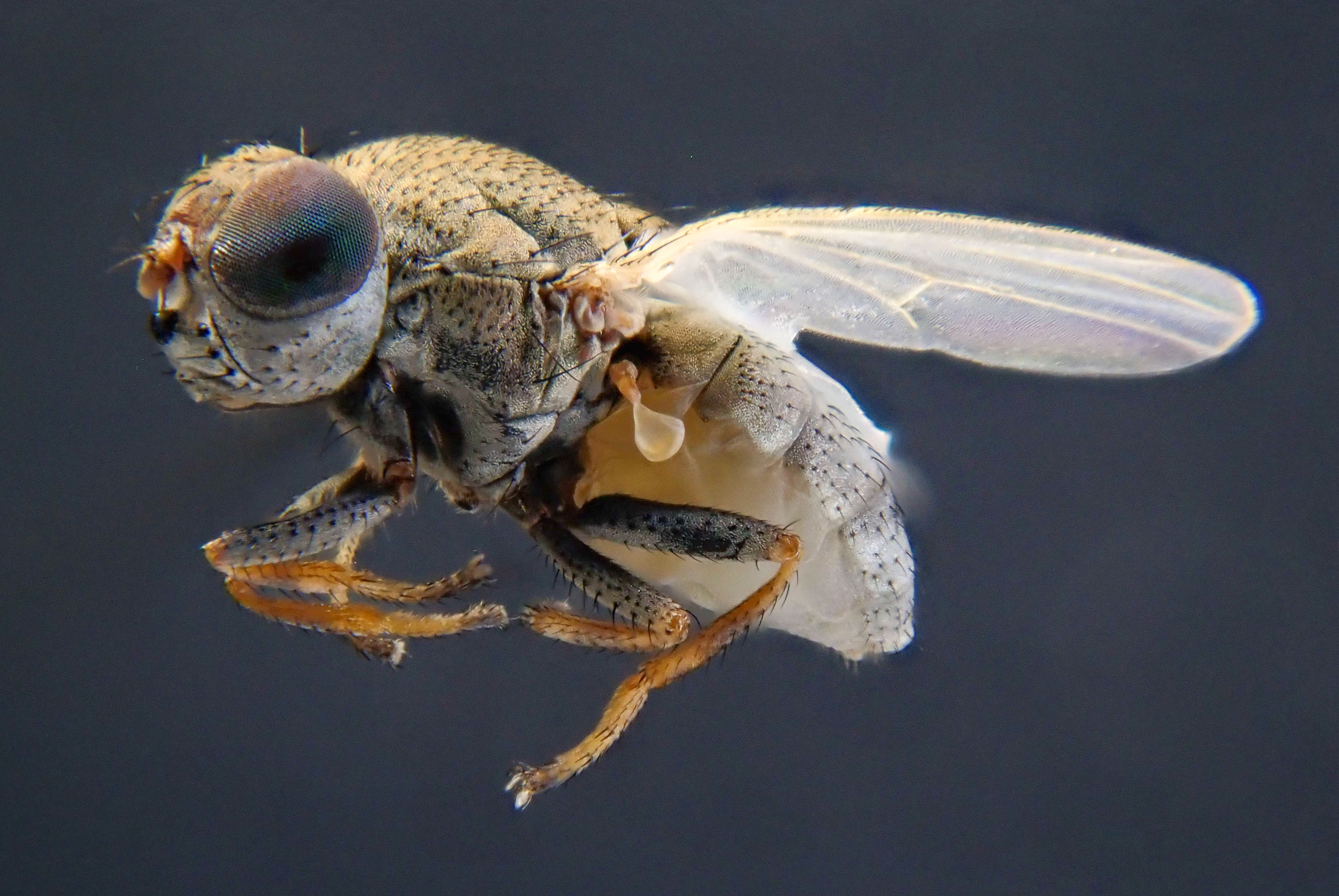
- Female Hecamede albicans

Scientific classification
- Kingdom: Animalia
- Phylum: Arthropoda
- Class: Insecta
- Order: Diptera
- Family: Ephydridae
- Subfamily: Gymnomyzinae
- Tribe: Hecamedini
- Genus: Hecamede
- Species: H. albicans

Binomial name
- Hecamede albicans (Meigen, 1830)

Synonyms
- Notiphila albicans Meigen, 1830

= Hecamede albicans =

Species of fly

Hecamede albicans is a species of shore flies (insects in the family Ephydridae).

== Distribution ==
United States, Europe, and Turkey.
