= Athyroglossa glaphyropus =

Scientific classification
- Kingdom: Animalia
- Phylum: Arthropoda
- Class: Insecta
- Order: Diptera
- Family: Ephydridae
- Subfamily: Gymnomyzinae
- Tribe: Gymnomyzini
- Genus: Athyroglossa
- Species: A. glaphyropus

Binomial name
- Athyroglossa glaphyropus Loew, 1878

Species of fly

Athyroglossa glaphyropus is a species of shore flies in the family Ephydridae.

== Distribution ==
United States, Neotropical.
