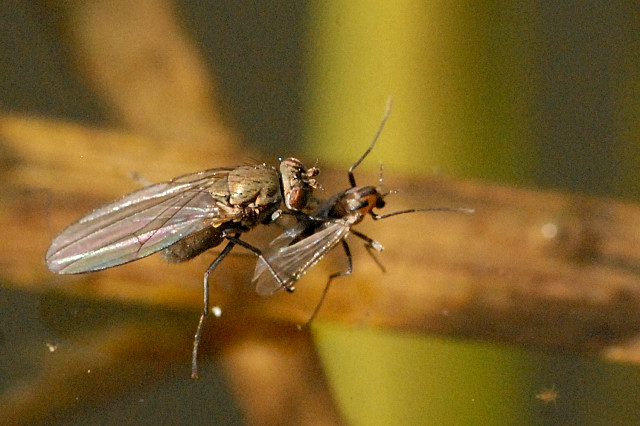
- Notiphila riparia Belgium

Scientific classification
- Kingdom: Animalia
- Phylum: Arthropoda
- Class: Insecta
- Order: Diptera
- Family: Ephydridae
- Subfamily: Hydrelliinae
- Tribe: Notiphilini
- Genus: Notiphila
- Species: N. riparia

Binomial name
- Notiphila riparia Meigen, 1830

Synonyms
- Notiphila guttiventris Stenhammar, 1844

= Notiphila riparia =

Species of fly

Notiphila riparia is a species of fly in the family Ephydridae. It is found in the Palearctic . jizz-Face often grey white, rarely yellow. May–September, - Common on water edge vegetation(pools and streams). All Europe.Urals.Near East.

== Distribution ==
Austria, Belgium, Czech Republic, Denmark, France, Hungary, Iran.
