= Ochthera anatolikos =

Scientific classification
- Kingdom: Animalia
- Phylum: Arthropoda
- Class: Insecta
- Order: Diptera
- Family: Ephydridae
- Subfamily: Gymnomyzinae
- Tribe: Ochtherini
- Genus: Ochthera
- Species: O. anatolikos

Binomial name
- Ochthera anatolikos Clausen, 1977

Species of fly

Ochthera anatolikos is a species of shore flies in the family Ephydridae.

== Distribution ==
Canada, United States.
