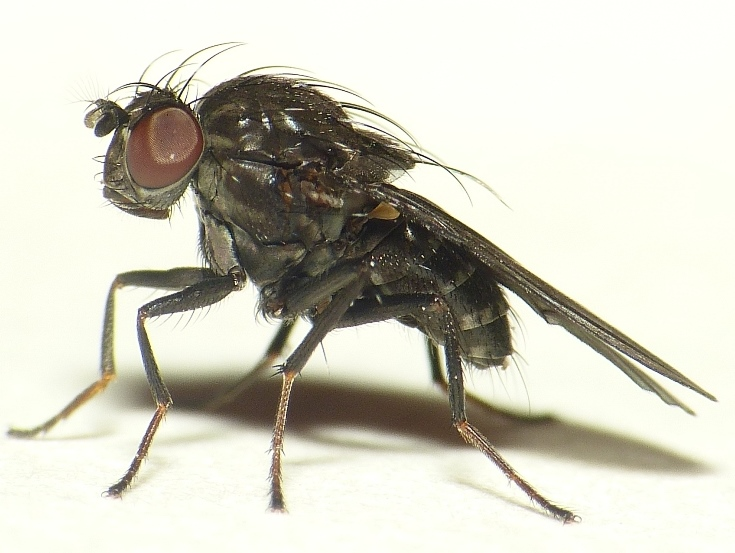
- Notiphila caudata Netherlands

Scientific classification
- Kingdom: Animalia
- Phylum: Arthropoda
- Class: Insecta
- Order: Diptera
- Family: Ephydridae
- Subfamily: Hydrelliinae
- Tribe: Notiphilini
- Genus: Notiphila
- Subgenus: Dichaeta
- Species: N. caudata

Binomial name
- Notiphila caudata Fallen, 1813

Synonyms
- Dichaeta caudata (Fallen, 1813); Dichaeta tibialis Brullé, 1833; Dichaeta brevicauda Loew, 1860; Dichaeta choui Fan, 2000

= Notiphila caudata =

Species of fly

Notiphila caudata is a species of fly in the family Ephydridae. It is found in the Palearctic. Male arista with 8-10 hairs. Abdomen: tergite IV with 8-16 marginal macrochaetes : Female tegument shining black; chaetotaxy normal. Wing: transverse MA2c slightly angled; 2 subequal costal spines. Length 4-4,25 mm. Found on pond margins and in other humid situations, from May to September.

== Distribution ==
Canada, United States, Europe.
