= Notiphila scalaris =

Scientific classification
- Kingdom: Animalia
- Phylum: Arthropoda
- Class: Insecta
- Order: Diptera
- Family: Ephydridae
- Subfamily: Hydrelliinae
- Tribe: Notiphilini
- Genus: Notiphila
- Species: N. scalaris

Binomial name
- Notiphila scalaris Loew, 1862

Species of fly

Notiphila scalaris is a species of shore flies (insects in the family Ephydridae).

== Distribution ==
Canada, United States.
