= Ochthera lauta =

Scientific classification
- Kingdom: Animalia
- Phylum: Arthropoda
- Class: Insecta
- Order: Diptera
- Family: Ephydridae
- Subfamily: Gymnomyzinae
- Tribe: Ochtherini
- Genus: Ochthera
- Species: O. lauta

Binomial name
- Ochthera lauta Wheeler, 1896

Species of fly

Ochthera lauta is a species of shore flies in the family Ephydridae.

== Distribution ==
United States, West Indies and Central America.
