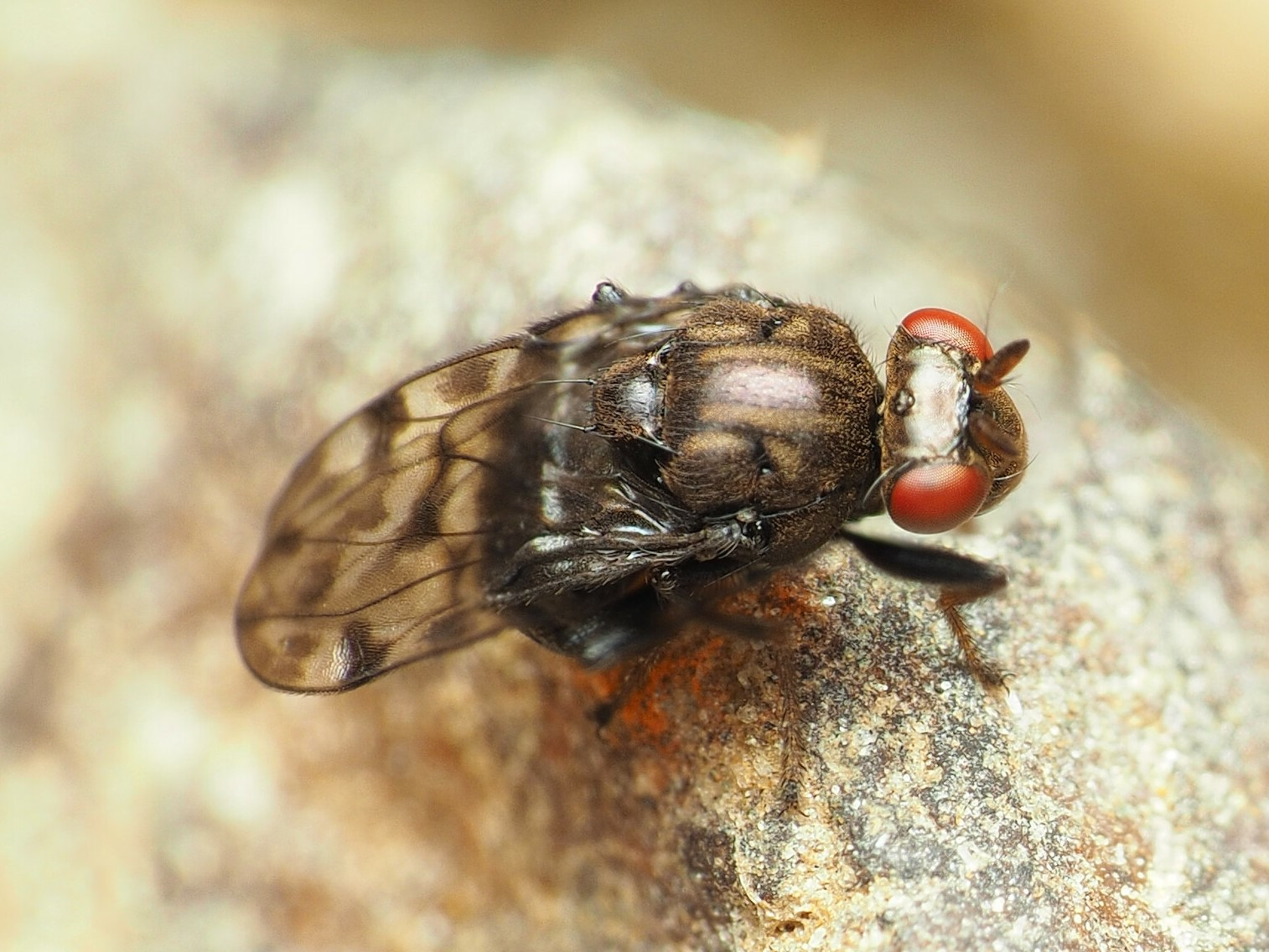

Scientific classification
- Kingdom: Animalia
- Phylum: Arthropoda
- Class: Insecta
- Order: Diptera
- Family: Ephydridae
- Subfamily: Gymnomyzinae
- Tribe: Gastropini
- Genus: Gastrops
- Species: G. nebulosus

Binomial name
- Gastrops nebulosus Coquillett, 1900

= Gastrops nebulosus =

Species of fly

Gastrops nebulosus is a species of shore fly in the family Ephydridae.

== Distribution ==
United States.
