= Typopsilopa nigra =

Scientific classification
- Domain: Eukaryota
- Kingdom: Animalia
- Phylum: Arthropoda
- Class: Insecta
- Order: Diptera
- Family: Ephydridae
- Genus: Typopsilopa
- Species: T. nigra

Binomial name
- Typopsilopa nigra (Williston, 1896)

Synonyms
- Psilopa nigra Williston, 1896; Typosilopa flavitarsis Cresson, 1916

Species of fly

Typopsilopa nigra is a species of shore fly in the family Ephydridae.
