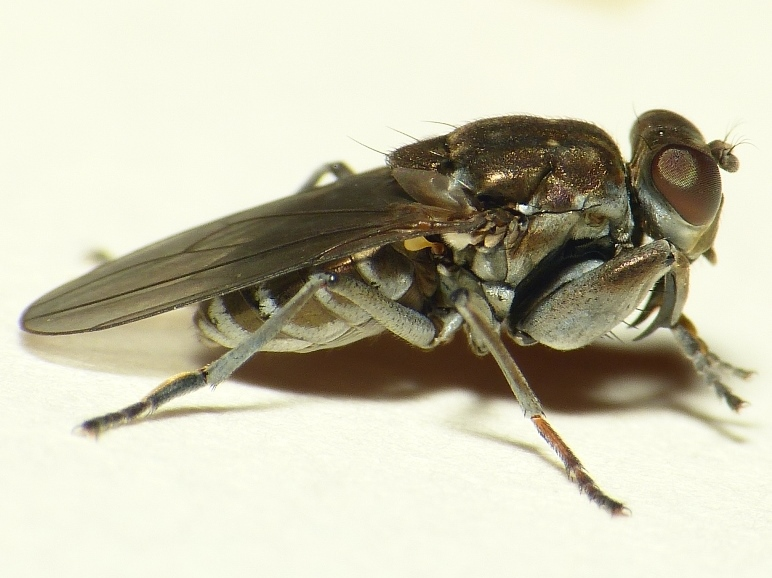

Scientific classification
- Kingdom: Animalia
- Phylum: Arthropoda
- Class: Insecta
- Order: Diptera
- Family: Ephydridae
- Subfamily: Gymnomyzinae
- Tribe: Ochtherini
- Genus: Ochthera
- Species: O. mantis

Binomial name
- Ochthera mantis (De Geer, 1776)

Synonyms
- Musca mantis De Geer, 1776

= Ochthera mantis =

Species of insect

Ochthera mantis, the mantis fly, is a shore fly (family Ephydridae). The species was first described by Charles De Geer in 1776.

It is a Holarctic species with a limited distribution in Europe.

== Biology ==
Ochthera mantis is a predatory fly found primarily on sandy or muddy shores, with the also predatory larvae being aquatic.
