= Dimecoenia =

Scientific classification
- Kingdom: Animalia
- Phylum: Arthropoda
- Class: Insecta
- Order: Diptera
- Family: Ephydridae
- Subfamily: Ephydrinae
- Tribe: Ephydrini
- Genus: Dimecoenia; Cresson, 1916

Synonyms
- Dimocoenia Curran, 1934

Genus of flies

Dimecoenia is a genus of shore flies in the family Ephydridae.

== Species ==
- D. abrupta Cresson, 1935
- D. caesia (Wulp, 1883)
- D. carrerai Oliveira, 1957
- D. chilensis (Macquart, 1850)
- D. ciligena (Rondani, 1868)
- D. coltaensis Cresson, 1935
- D. densepilosa (Hendel, 1930)
- D. fuscifemur Steyskal, 1970
- D. gilvipes (Coquillett, 1901)
- D. grumanni Oliveira, 1954
- D. lenti Oliveira, 1954
- D. lopesi Oliveira, 1954
- D. prionoptera (Thomson, 1869)
- D. spinosa (Loew, 1864)
- D. travassosi Mello & Oliveira, 1992
- D. tristanensis Frey, 1954
- D. venteli Oliveira, 1954
- D. zurcheri Hendel, 1933
