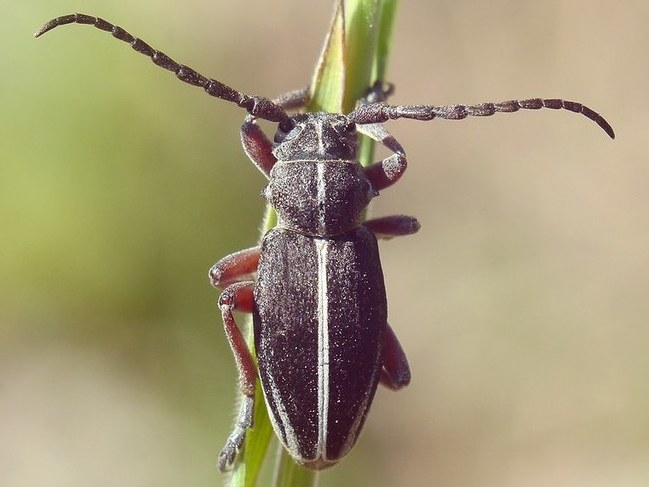

Scientific classification
- Kingdom: Animalia
- Phylum: Arthropoda
- Clade: Pancrustacea
- Class: Insecta
- Order: Coleoptera
- Suborder: Polyphaga
- Infraorder: Cucujiformia
- Family: Cerambycidae
- Genus: Dorcadion
- Species: D. tauricum

Binomial name
- Dorcadion tauricum Waltl, 1838

= Dorcadion tauricum =

Species of beetle

Dorcadion tauricum is a species of beetle in the family Cerambycidae.

== Description ==
Adults have a length of 11–14 millimetres (0.43–0.55 in). They are black, although the legs are brownish-red. The antennae are brownish-red to black, although the first segment is red. The suture and marginal strips are bright, the remnants of the shoulder band are visible.
