= Schema (fly) =

Scientific classification
- Kingdom: Animalia
- Phylum: Arthropoda
- Class: Insecta
- Order: Diptera
- Family: Ephydridae
- Subfamily: Hydrelliinae
- Tribe: Atissini
- Genus: Schema; Becker, 1907

Synonyms
- Pelignus Cresson, 1926; Atissina Cresson, 1936

Genus of flies

Schema is a genus of shore flies in the family Ephydridae.

== Species ==
- Schema acrosticale (Becker, 1903)
- Schema aldabricum Mathis & Zatwarnicki, 2003
- Schema durrenbergense (Loew, 1864)
- Schema fundatum (Collin, 1949)
- Schema minutum Becker, 1907
- Schema salina (Cresson, 1942)
