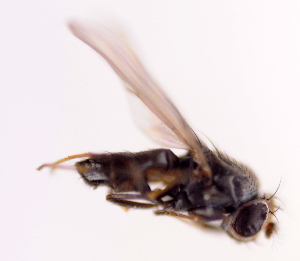

Scientific classification
- Kingdom: Animalia
- Phylum: Arthropoda
- Class: Insecta
- Order: Diptera
- Family: Ephydridae
- Subfamily: Gymnomyzinae
- Tribe: Discocerinini
- Genus: Discocerina
- Species: D. obscurella

Binomial name
- Discocerina obscurella (Fallén, 1813)

Synonyms
- Notiphila obscurella Fallén, 1813; Drosophila cinerella Fallén, 1823; Notiphila nigrina Meigen, 1830; Notiphila pusilla Meigen, 1830; Notiphila tristis Meigen, 1830; Discocerina parva Loew, 1862; Hippelates porteri Brèthes, 1925; Discocerina nitidiventris Hendel, 1930

= Discocerina obscurella =

Species of fly

Discocerina obscurella is a species of shore flies in the family Ephydridae.

== Distribution ==
Canada, United States, Neotropical, Europe.
