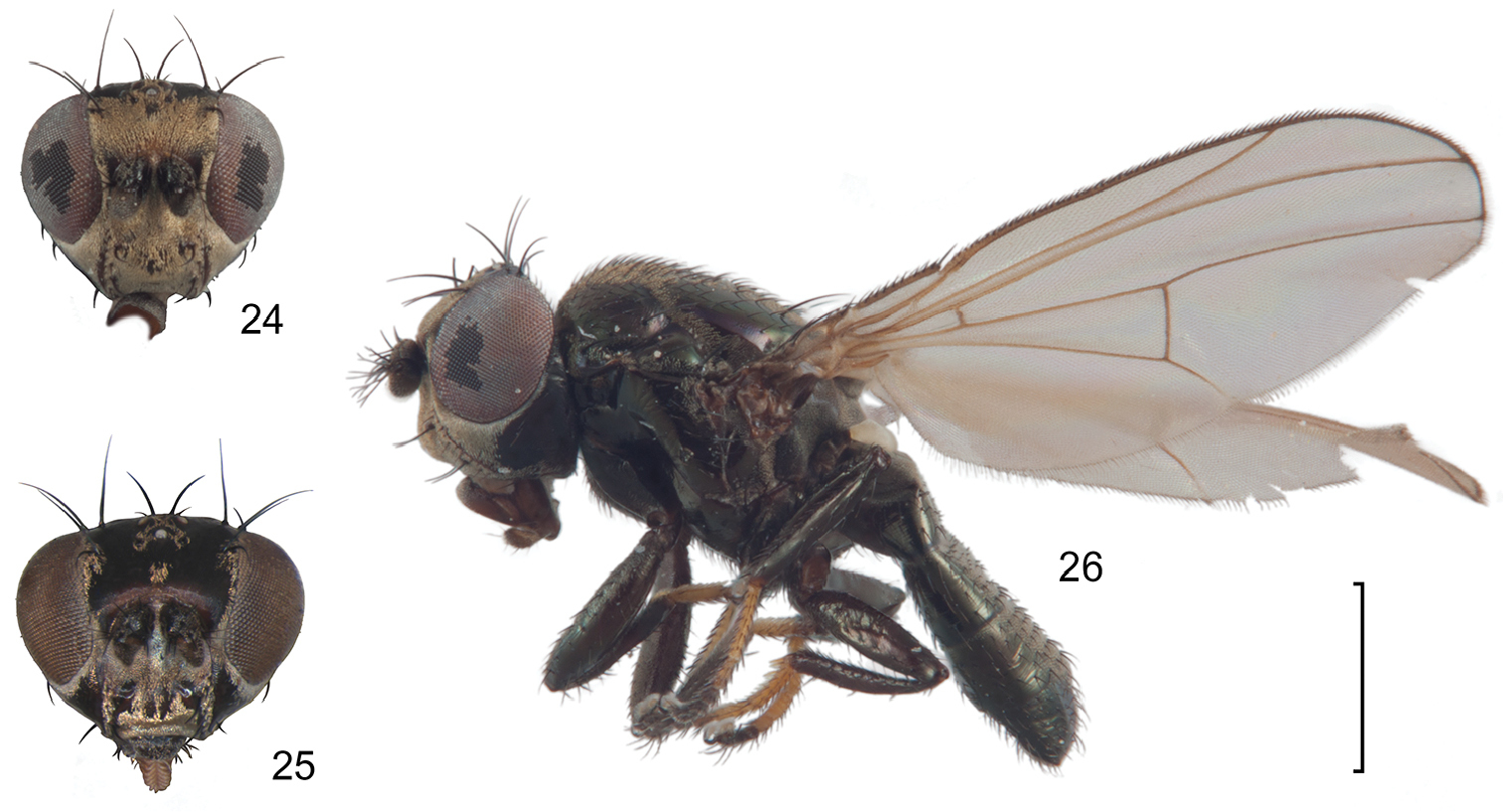
- Lamproclasiopa auritunica

Scientific classification
- Kingdom: Animalia
- Phylum: Arthropoda
- Class: Insecta
- Order: Diptera
- Family: Ephydridae
- Subfamily: Gymnomyzinae
- Tribe: Discocerinini
- Genus: Lamproclasiopa; Hendel, 1933

Type species
- Lamproclasiopa facialis Hendel, 1933

Synonyms
- Basila Cresson, 1942

= Lamproclasiopa =

Genus of flies

Lamproclasiopa is a genus of shore flies in the family Ephydridae.

== Species ==
- Lamproclasiopa aliceae Costa, Mathis & Marinoni, 2016
- Lamproclasiopa aracataca (Cresson, 1940)
- Lamproclasiopa argentipicta Costa, Mathis & Marinoni, 2016
- Lamproclasiopa auritunica Costa, Mathis & Marinoni, 2016
- Lamproclasiopa balsamae (Cresson, 1930)
- Lamproclasiopa bisetulosa (Cresson, 1939)
- Lamproclasiopa brunnea Costa, Mathis & Marinoni, 2016
- Lamproclasiopa brunneonitens (Cresson, 1940)
- Lamproclasiopa caligosa Costa, Mathis & Marinoni, 2016
- Lamproclasiopa curva Costa, Mathis & Marinoni, 2016
- Lamproclasiopa ecuadoriensis Costa, Mathis & Marinoni, 2016
- Lamproclasiopa fumipennis (Wirth, 1955)
- Lamproclasiopa furvitibia Costa, Mathis & Marinoni, 2016
- Lamproclasiopa hendeli Wirth, 1968
- Lamproclasiopa laevior (Cresson, 1934)
- Lamproclasiopa lapaz Costa, Mathis & Marinoni, 2016
- Lamproclasiopa mancha Costa, Mathis & Marinoni, 2016
- Lamproclasiopa nadineae (Cresson, 1925)
- Lamproclasiopa nitida (Cresson, 1918)
- Lamproclasiopa painteri (Cresson, 1930)
- Lamproclasiopa polita (Edwards, 1933)
- Lamproclasiopa puella (Cresson, 1931)
- Lamproclasiopa triangularis Costa, Mathis & Marinoni, 2016
- Lamproclasiopa turgidula (Cresson, 1940)
- Lamproclasiopa univittata (Cresson, 1946)
- Lamproclasiopa xanthocera Costa, Mathis & Marinoni, 2016
- Lamproclasiopa zerafael Costa, Mathis & Marinoni, 2016
