= Athyroglossa =

Scientific classification
- Kingdom: Animalia
- Phylum: Arthropoda
- Class: Insecta
- Order: Diptera
- Family: Ephydridae
- Subfamily: Gymnomyzinae
- Tribe: Gymnomyzini
- Genus: Athyroglossa; Loew, 1860

Type species
- Notiphila glabra Meigen, 1830

Synonyms
- Ochtheroidea Williston, 1896; Stranditrichoma Duda, 1942

Genus of flies

Athyroglossa is a genus of shore flies in the family Ephydridae.

== Species ==
- A. africana (Wirth, 1955)^{c}
- A. argyrata Hendel, 1931^{c g}
- A. atra (Williston, 1896)
- A. barrosi Brèthes, 1919^{c g}
- A. cressoni Wirth, 1970^{i c g}
- A. dinorata Mathis & Zatwarnicki, 1990^{c g}
- A. dubia (Williston, 1896)
- A. evidens Cresson, 1925^{c g}
- A. fascipennis (Cresson, 1918)^{c g}
- A. flaviventris (Meigen, 1830)
- A. freta Cresson, 1925^{c g}
- A. glabra (Meigen, 1830)
- A. glaphyropus Loew, 1878
- A. granulosa (Cresson, 1922)^{i c g}
- A. kaplanae Mathis & Zatwarnicki, 1990^{c g}
- A. laevis (Cresson, 1918)^{i c g}
- A. leonensis Canzoneri & Rampini, 1987^{g}
- A. lindneri Wirth, 1964^{c g}
- A. lucida Canzoneri & Meneghini, 1969
- A. melanderi (Cresson, 1922)^{i c g}
- A. metallica Canzoneri & Meneghini, 1969
- A. nigripes Miyagi, 1977^{c g}
- A. nitida Williston, 1896
- A. nudiuscula Loew, 1873^{c g}
- A. ordinata Becker, 1896^{i c g}
- A. rivalis Miyagi, 1977^{c g}
- A. rossii Canzoneri & Raffone, 1987^{g}
- A. scabra Cresson, 1925^{c g}
- A. schineri Séguy, 1934^{c g}
- A. semiseriata Canzoneri & Meneghini, 1969
- A. similis (Cresson, 1918)^{c g}
- A. sulcata (Hendel, 1930)^{c g}
- A. tectora Cresson, 1926^{c g}
- A. transversa Sturtevant and Wheeler, 1954^{i c g}

Data sources: i = ITIS, c = Catalogue of Life, g = GBIF, b = Bugguide.net
