= Eucerceris superba =

Scientific classification
- Kingdom: Animalia
- Phylum: Arthropoda
- Clade: Pancrustacea
- Class: Insecta
- Order: Hymenoptera
- Family: Philanthidae
- Genus: Eucerceris
- Species: E. superba

Binomial name
- Eucerceris superba Cresson, 1865

Synonyms
- Cerceris dichroa Dalla Torre, 1890; Cerceris fulviceps (Cresson, 1879); Eucerceris bicolor Cresson, 1882; Eucerceris fulviceps Cresson, 1879; Eucerceris fulviceps rhodops Viereck and Cockerell, 1904; Eucerceris superba bicolor Cresson, 1882; Eucerceris superba dichroa (Dalla Torre, 1890)

Species of wasp

Eucerceris superba is a species of wasp in the family Philanthidae. It is found in North America.
