= Lemnaphila =

Scientific classification
- Kingdom: Animalia
- Phylum: Arthropoda
- Class: Insecta
- Order: Diptera
- Family: Ephydridae
- Subfamily: Hydrelliinae
- Tribe: Hydrelliini
- Genus: Lemnaphila; Cresson, 1933

Genus of flies

Lemnaphila is a genus of duckweed miner flies in the family Ephydridae.

== Species ==
- L. grossoae Mathis & Edmiston, 2000
- L. lilloana Lizarralde de Grosso, 1978
- L. lillolana Lizarralde de Grosso, 1978
- L. longicera Mathis & Edmiston, 2000
- L. neotropica Lizarralde de Grosso, 1977
- L. scotlandae Cresson, 1933
- L. wirthi Lizarralde de Grosso, 1977
