= Eucerceris flavocincta =

Scientific classification
- Domain: Eukaryota
- Kingdom: Animalia
- Phylum: Arthropoda
- Class: Insecta
- Order: Hymenoptera
- Family: Philanthidae
- Genus: Eucerceris
- Species: E. flavocincta

Binomial name
- Eucerceris flavocincta Cresson, 1865

Synonyms
- Cerceris cingulatus (Cresson, 1865); Eucerceris chapmanae Viereck and Cockerell, 1904; Eucerceris cingulata Cresson, 1865; Eucerceris striareata Viereck and Cockerell, 1904

Species of wasp

Eucerceris flavocincta is a species of wasp in the family Philanthidae. It is found in North America.
