= Hemicyclops =

Hemicyclops may refer to two different groups of organisms:

- Hemicyclops Meijere, 1913, a synonym for Hecamede (fly), a genus of flies
- Hemicyclops Claus, 1893, a genus of copepods in the family Clausidiidae
