= Megachile azteca =

Scientific classification
- Domain: Eukaryota
- Kingdom: Animalia
- Phylum: Arthropoda
- Class: Insecta
- Order: Hymenoptera
- Family: Megachilidae
- Genus: Megachile
- Species: M. azteca

Binomial name
- Megachile azteca Cresson, 1878

Species of leafcutter bee (Megachile)

Megachile azteca is a species of bee in the family Megachilidae. It was described by Ezra Townsend Cresson in 1878.
