= Dimecoenia spinosa =

Scientific classification
- Kingdom: Animalia
- Phylum: Arthropoda
- Class: Insecta
- Order: Diptera
- Family: Ephydridae
- Tribe: Ephydrini
- Genus: Dimecoenia
- Species: D. spinosa

Binomial name
- Dimecoenia spinosa (Loew, 1864)

Synonyms
- Coenia spinosa Loew, 1864

Species of fly

Dimecoenia spinosa is a species of shore flies in the family Ephydridae.

== Distribution ==
Canada, Mexico, United States, West Indies.
