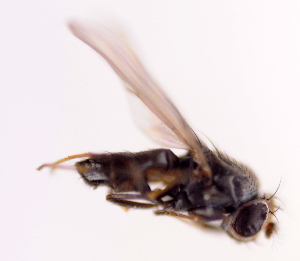
- Discocerina obscurella

Scientific classification
- Kingdom: Animalia
- Phylum: Arthropoda
- Class: Insecta
- Order: Diptera
- Family: Ephydridae
- Subfamily: Gymnomyzinae
- Tribe: Discocerinini
- Genus: Discocerina; Macquart, 1835

Type species
- Notiphila pusilla Meigen, 1830

Synonyms
- Clasiopa Stenhammar, 1844

= Discocerina =

Genus of flies

Discocerina is a genus of shore flies in the family Ephydridae.

== Species ==
- D. atrifacies Malloch, 1934
- D. avanae Mathis & Zatwarnicki, 2010
- D. biseta Meijere, 1916
- D. buccatum (Cresson, 1930)
- D. chalybea Hendel, 1930
- D. communis Malloch, 1934
- D. delmarva Mathis & Zatwarnicki, 2010
- D. flavifrons Hendel, 1930
- D. flavipes Cresson, 1941
- D. juniori Mathis, 1997
- D. mauritanica Vitte, 1991
- D. mera Cresson, 1939
- D. nadineae (Cresson, 1925)
- D. nana Williston, 1896
- D. nepos Cresson, 1918
- D. obscura Williston, 1896
- D. obscurella (Fallén, 1813)
- D. peculiaris Miyagi, 1977
- D. sana Cresson, 1931
