= Gastrops =

Scientific classification
- Kingdom: Animalia
- Phylum: Arthropoda
- Class: Insecta
- Order: Diptera
- Family: Ephydridae
- Subfamily: Gymnomyzinae
- Tribe: Gastropini
- Genus: Gastrops; Williston, 1897

Type species
- Gastrops niger Williston, 1897

Genus of flies

Gastrops is a genus of shore flies in the family Ephydridae.

== Species ==
- G. auropunctatus Hendel, 1930
- G. bicuspidatus (Karsch, 1881)
- G. flavipes Wirth, 1958
- G. fuscivenosus Wirth, 1958
- G. nebulosus Coquillett, 1900
- G. niger Williston, 1897
- G. ringueleti Lizarralde de Grosso, 1984
- G. willistoni Cresson, 1914
