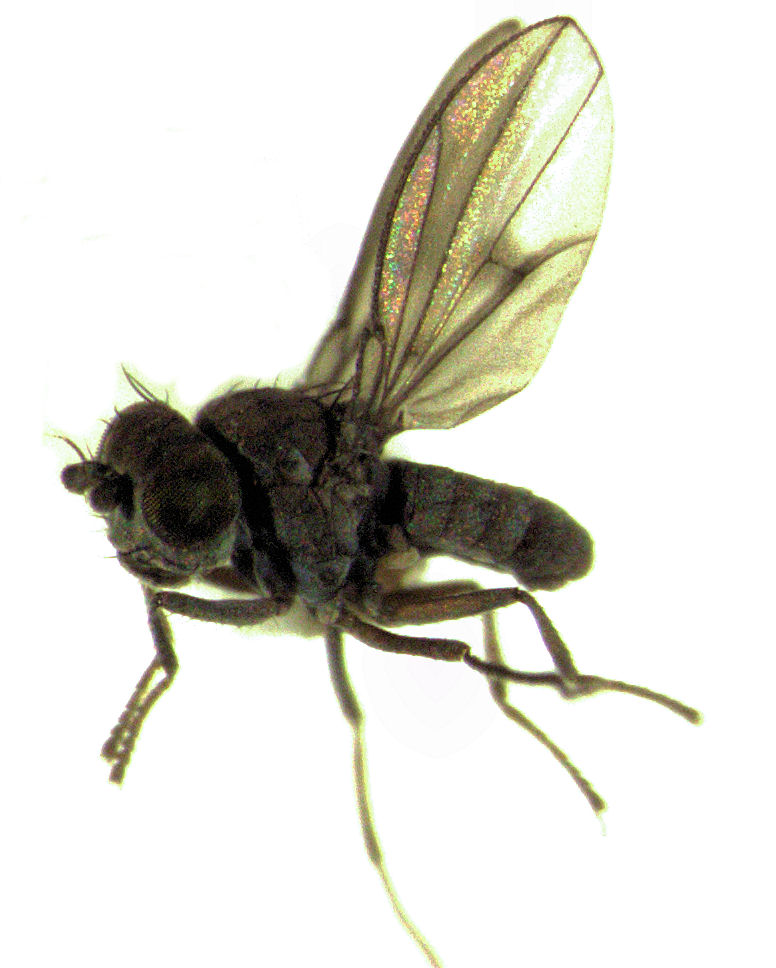
- Atissa suturalis

Scientific classification
- Domain: Eukaryota
- Kingdom: Animalia
- Phylum: Arthropoda
- Class: Insecta
- Order: Diptera
- Family: Ephydridae
- Subfamily: Hydrelliinae
- Tribe: Atissini
- Genus: Atissa; Haliday, 1839

= Atissa =

Genus of flies

Atissa is a genus of shore flies in the family Ephydridae.

== Species ==
- A. antennalis Aldrich, 1931
- A. hepaticoloris Becker, 1903
- A. kairensis Becker, 1903
- A. kerteszi Papp, 1974
- A. limosina Becker, 1896
- A. litoralis (Cole, 1912)
- A. luteipes Cresson, 1944
- A. mimula Cresson, 1931
- A. oahuensis Cresson, 1948
- A. pygmaea (Haliday, 1833)
- A. suturalis Cresson, 1929
