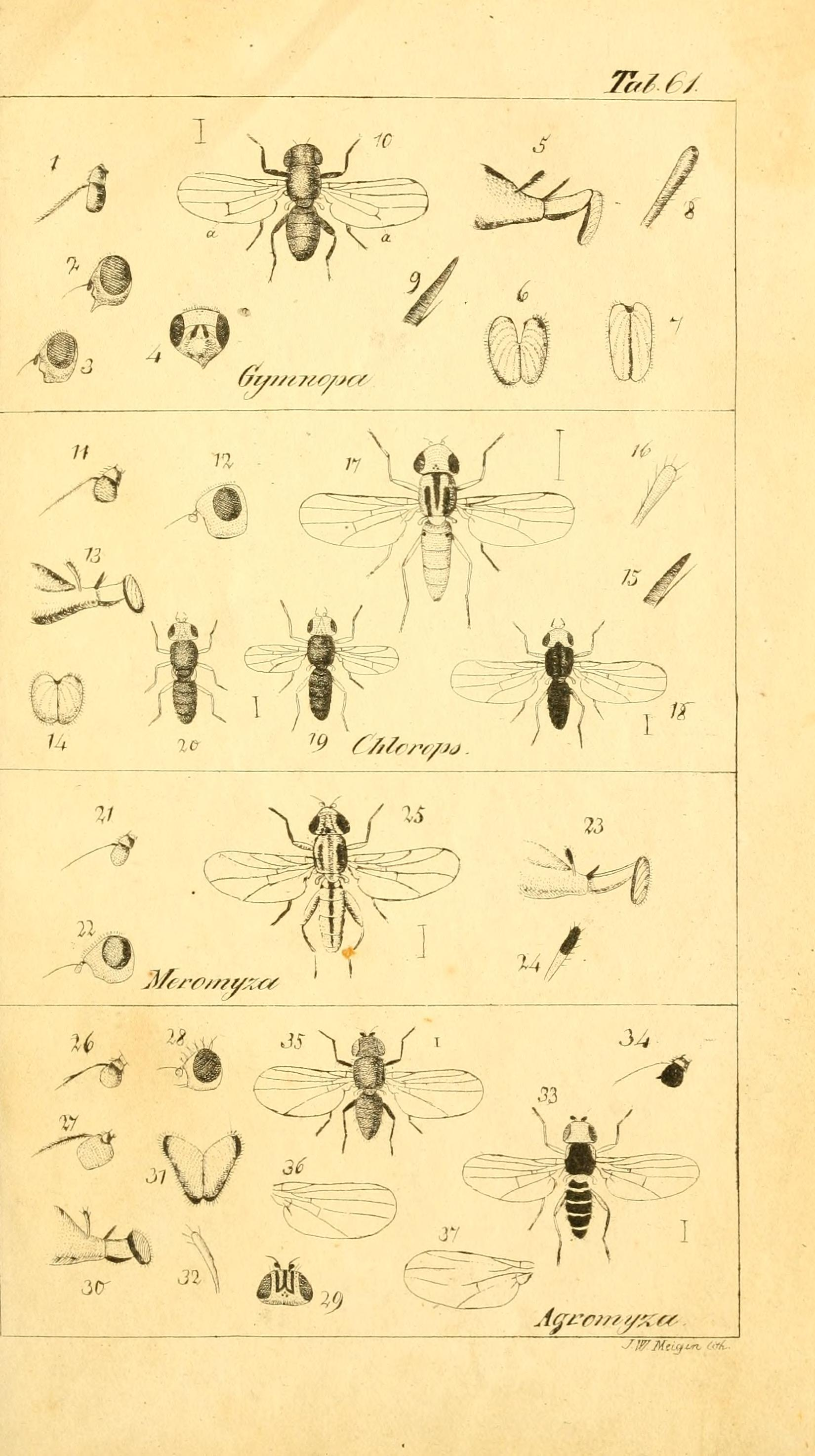
- as Gymnopa in Meigen Systematische Beschreibung der bekannten europäischen zweiflügeligen Insekten

Scientific classification
- Kingdom: Animalia
- Phylum: Arthropoda
- Class: Insecta
- Order: Diptera
- Family: Ephydridae
- Subfamily: Gymnomyzinae
- Tribe: Gymnomyzini
- Genus: Mosillus; Latreille, 1804

Type species
- Mosillus arcuatus Latreille, 1805

Synonyms
- Gymnomyza Fallén, 1810; Mocillus Samouelle, 1819; Gymnopa Fallén, 1820; Tichodartha Billberg, 1820; Glabrinus Rondani, 1856; Gymnopha Rondani, 1856

= Mosillus =

Genus of flies

Mosillus is a genus of shore flies in the family Ephydridae.

== Species ==
- M. asiaticus Mathis, Zatwarnicki & Krivosheina, 1993
- M. beckeri (Cresson, 1925)
- M. bidentatus (Cresson, 1926)
- M. bracteatus Schiner, 1868
- M. frontina (Costa, 1854)
- M. gutticosta (Walker, 1856)
- M. infusus (Walker, 1856)
- M. stegmaieri Wirth, 1969
- M. subsultans (Fabricius, 1794)
- M. tibialis Cresson, 1916
