= Typopsilopa =

Scientific classification
- Domain: Eukaryota
- Kingdom: Animalia
- Phylum: Arthropoda
- Class: Insecta
- Order: Diptera
- Family: Ephydridae
- Subfamily: Hydrelliinae
- Genus: Typopsilopa; Cresson, 1916

Genus of flies

Typopsilopa is a genus of shore flies in the family Ephydridae. There are about 19 described species in Typopsilopa.

== Species ==
These 19 species belong to the genus Typopsilopa:

- T. antennalis Wirth, 1968^{i c g}
- T. antennata Canzoneri & Meneghini, 1969^{c g}
- T. archboldi Wirth, 1968^{c g}
- T. arnaudi Wirth, 1968^{i c g}
- T. atra (Loew, 1862)^{i c g}
- T. chinensis (Wiedemann, 1830)^{c g}
- T. dimidiata Canzoneri & Meneghini, 1969^{c g}
- T. electa (Becker, 1903)^{c g}
- T. ethiopiae Wirth, 1968^{c g}
- T. inca Wirth, 1968^{c g}
- T. keiseri Wirth, 1968^{c g}
- T. kerteszi Papp, 1975^{c g}
- T. manni Wirth, 1968^{c g}
- T. miyagii Wirth, 1968^{c g}
- T. moruensis Canzoneri & Raffone, 1987^{c g}
- T. natalensis Wirth, 1956^{c g}
- T. nigra (Williston, 1896)^{i c g b}
- T. nigritella Canzoneri & Meneghini, 1969^{c g}
- T. spinulosa Wirth, 1968^{c g}

Data sources: i = ITIS, c = Catalogue of Life, g = GBIF, b = Bugguide.net
