= Micropeza nitidor =

Scientific classification
- Domain: Eukaryota
- Kingdom: Animalia
- Phylum: Arthropoda
- Class: Insecta
- Order: Diptera
- Family: Micropezidae
- Genus: Micropeza
- Species: M. nitidor

Binomial name
- Micropeza nitidor Cresson, 1938

Synonyms
- Tylos nitidus Hennig, 1936

Species of fly

Micropeza nitidor is a species of stilt-legged flies in the family Micropezidae.
