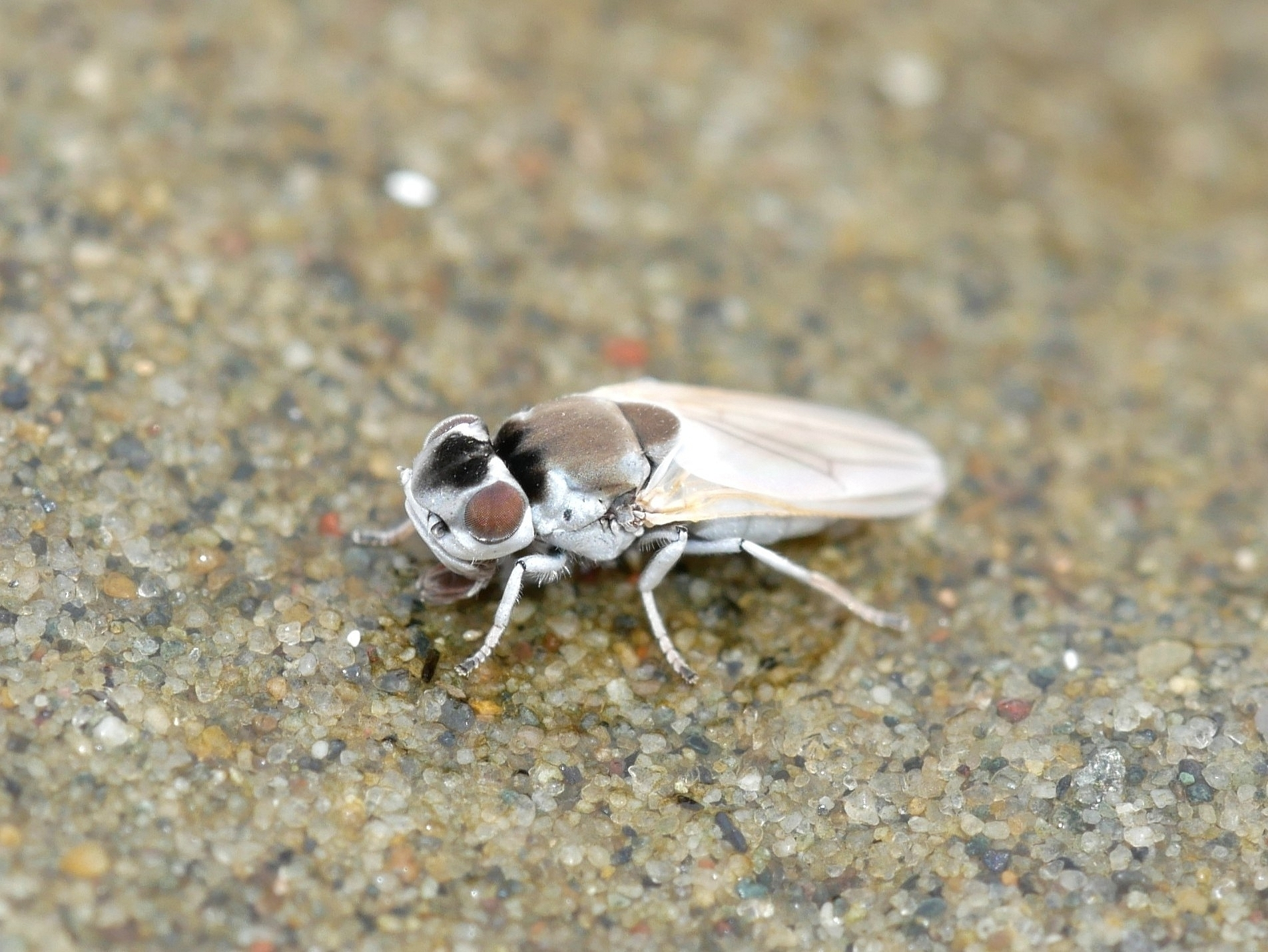
- Lipochaeta ranica

Scientific classification
- Kingdom: Animalia
- Phylum: Arthropoda
- Class: Insecta
- Order: Diptera
- Family: Ephydridae
- Genus: Lipochaeta
- Species: L. ranica

Binomial name
- Lipochaeta ranica Mathis and Trautwein, 2003

= Lipochaeta ranica =

Species of shore fly

Lipochaeta ranica is a species of new world shore flies in the Ephydridae family. It was described by Wayne Mathis and Michelle Trautwein in 2003. It occurs in saline or alkaline habitats, particularly along the coast of California and North Mexico.
