= Hecamede (fly) =

Scientific classification
- Kingdom: Animalia
- Phylum: Arthropoda
- Class: Insecta
- Order: Diptera
- Family: Ephydridae
- Subfamily: Gymnomyzinae
- Tribe: Hecamedini
- Genus: Hecamede; Haliday in Curtis, 1837

Type species
- Notiphila albicans Meigen, 1830

Synonyms
- Hemicyclops Meijere, 1913; Soikia Canzoneri & Meneghini, 1969

Genus of flies

Hecamede is a genus of shore flies (insects in the family Ephydridae).

== Species ==
- H. affinis Canzoneri & Meneghini, 1969
- H. africana Mathis, 1993
- H. albicans (Meigen, 1830)
- H. australis Mathis, 1993
- H. bocki Mathis, 1993
- H. brasiliensis Cresson, 1938
- H. globifera (Boheman, 1852)
- H. granifera (Thomson, 1869)
- H. grisescens Becker, 1903
- H. maculipleuris (Meijere, 1914)
- H. maritima Mathis, 1993
- H. nuda Wirth, 1956
- H. persimilis Hendel, 1913
- H. planifrons (Meijere, 1913)
- H. socotra Mathis, 1993
- H. tomentosa Mathis, 1993
