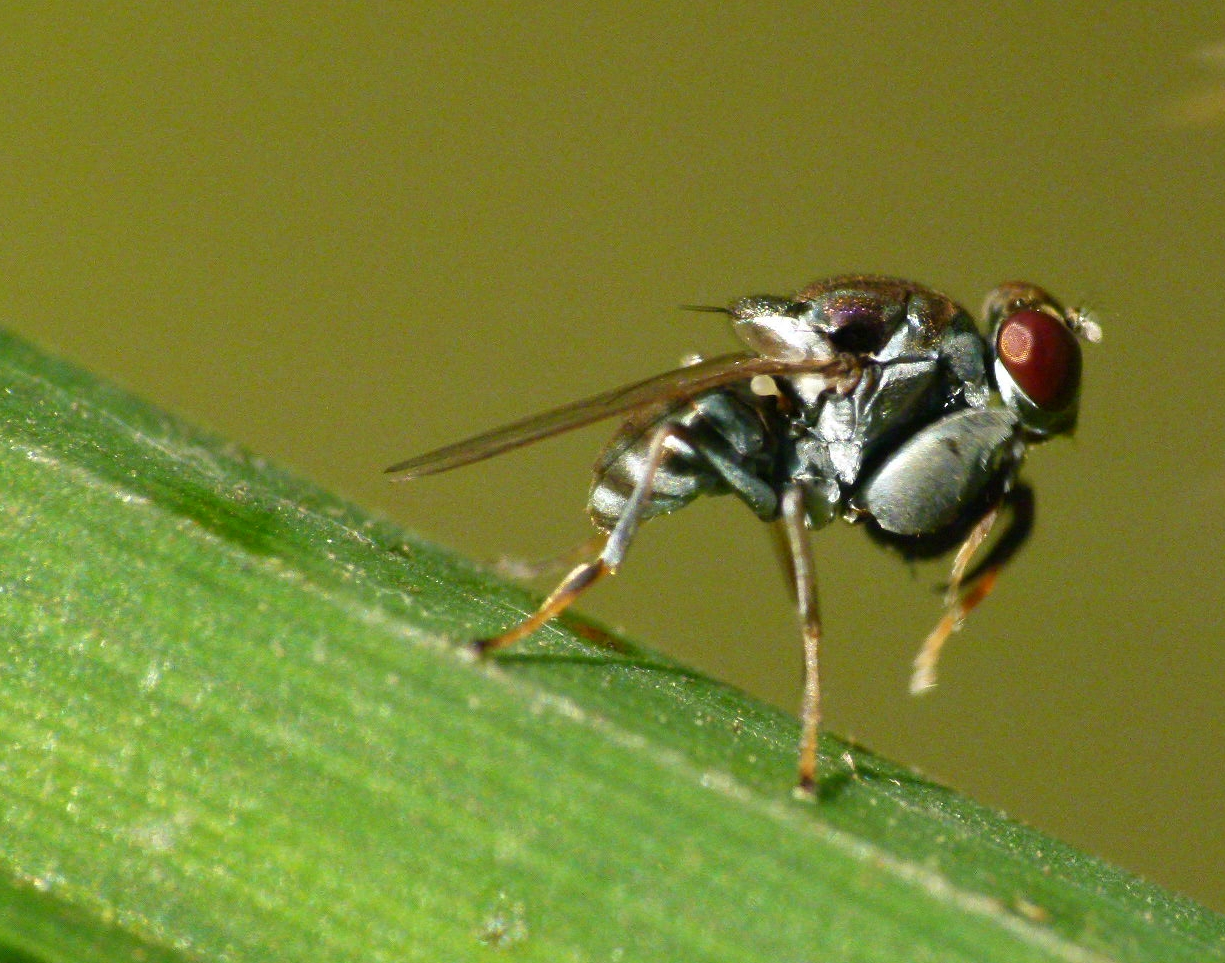
- Ochthera sp. from the Western Ghats

Scientific classification
- Kingdom: Animalia
- Phylum: Arthropoda
- Class: Insecta
- Order: Diptera
- Family: Ephydridae
- Subfamily: Gymnomyzinae
- Tribe: Ochtherini
- Genus: Ochthera; Latreille, 1802

Type species
- Musca manicata Fabricius, 1794

= Ochthera =

Genus of flies

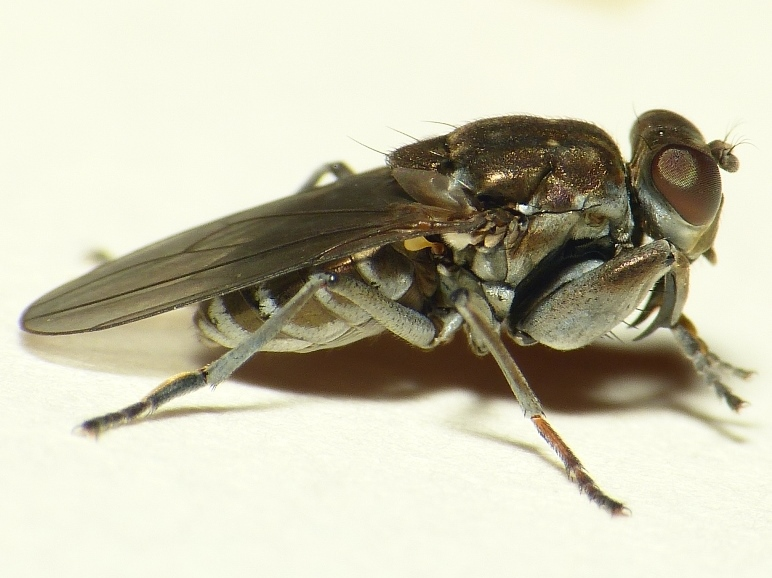
Ochthera mantis

Ochthera is a genus of flies in the family of shore flies (Ephydridae). The genus is distinctive because of the swollen raptorial forelegs. The larvae are predaceous on midge larvae while the adults feed on midges and mosquitoes. The genus is found around the world with about 37 species. The species Ochthera chalybescens has been shown to prey on African malaria vectors.

== Behaviour ==
It has been noted that foreleg waving may be involved in displays and UV reflective patches on the face and fore coxae may be involved.

Spreading and waving of the foreleg is involved in same sex encounters as well as with male and female pairs during approach. It is not known if it is a threat or a recognition display. Adult Ochthera mantis have been noted to probe sand with their proboscis and when they detect prey such as chirononomid larvae, they are excavated using the fore tibial spines and held between the tibia and femora as the prey is consumed.

All species in the genus are predaceous.

== Species ==
These 55 species belong to the genus Ochthera:

- Ochthera acta Clausen, 1977
- Ochthera anatolikos Clausen, 1977
- Ochthera angustifacies (Hendel, 1930)
- Ochthera angustitarsus Becker, 1903
- Ochthera argyrata Wirth, 1955
- Ochthera baia Cresson, 1931
- Ochthera borealis Clausen, 1977
- Ochthera brevitivialis Meijere, 1908
- Ochthera caeruleovittata Hendel, 1930
- Ochthera canescens Cresson, 1931
- Ochthera canzonerii Raffone, 2002
- Ochthera chalybescens Loew, 1862
- Ochthera circularis Cresson, 1926
- Ochthera clauseni Raffone, 2002
- Ochthera collina Clausen, 1977
- Ochthera cressoni Giordani Soika, 1956
- Ochthera cuprilineata Wheeler, 1896
- Ochthera dasylenos Clausen, 1977
- Ochthera exsculpta Loew, 1862
- Ochthera friderichsi Enderlein, 1922
- Ochthera guangdongensis Zhang & Yang, 2006
- Ochthera hainanensis Zhang & Yang, 2006
- Ochthera harpax Meijere, 1911
- Ochthera humilis Williston, 1896
- Ochthera innotata Walker, 1860
- Ochthera insularis Becker, 1910
- Ochthera japonica Clausen, 1977
- Ochthera jos Cresson, 1939
- Ochthera lauta Wheeler, 1896
- Ochthera loreta Cresson, 1931
- Ochthera macrothrix Clasuen, 1977
- Ochthera manicata (Fabricius, 1794)
- Ochthera mantis (De Geer, 1776)
- Ochthera mantispa Loew, 1847
- Ochthera margarita Cresson, 1932
- Ochthera nigricoxa (Cresson, 1938)
- Ochthera nigripes (Enderlein, 1922)
- Ochthera occidentalis Clausen, 1977
- Ochthera painteri Cresson, 1931
- Ochthera palaearctica Clausen, 1977
- Ochthera palearctica Clausen, 1977
- Ochthera pilimana Becker, 1903
- Ochthera pilosa Cresson, 1926
- Ochthera praedatoria Loew, 1862
- Ochthera regalis Williston, 1897
- Ochthera rossii Raffone, 2002
- Ochthera rotunda Schiner, 1868
- Ochthera sauteri Cresson, 1932
- Ochthera schembrii Rondani, 1847
- Ochthera setigera Czerny, 1909
- Ochthera speculifera (Enderlein, 1922)
- Ochthera subtilis Adams, 1905
- Ochthera triornata Cresson, 1926
- Ochthera tuberculata Loew, 1862
- Ochthera wrighti Cresson, 1931
