= Rhynchopsilopa =

Scientific classification
- Kingdom: Animalia
- Phylum: Arthropoda
- Class: Insecta
- Order: Diptera
- Family: Ephydridae
- Genus: Rhynchopsilopa; Hendel, 1913

Genus of flies

Rhynchopsilopa is a genus of shore-flies (Ephydridae). The adults feed on the gut contents of ants. They use their antennae to locate ant nests and use their long sclerotized proboscis to puncture the abdomen of ant workers and feed on the gut contents without killing their victims. They also take honey in laboratory conditions and may not be obligate associates of ants. Their larvae are unknown. Species in the genus are found in Africa and Asia.

The genus is placed in the tribe Psilopini within which they are distinct in having long pendant antennae, a long proboscis, a short forehead, a concave face, and a convex abdomen. After locating an ant, they run after it rather than fly. They jab and obtain gut contents from the ant abdomen very rapidly.

About 18 species have been described:

- Rhynchopsilopa albipunctata Wirth, 1968 (South Africa, Angola)
- Rhynchopsilopa apicallis Collin, 1921 (Nigeria)
- Rhynchopsilopa ceylonensis Cresson, 1937 (Sri Lanka)
- Rhynchopsilopa coei Wirth, 1968 (Nepal, China)
- Rhynchopsilopa frontalis Wirth, 1968 (Nepal)
- Rhynchopsilopa fuscipennis Wirth, 1968 (Nigeria)
- Rhynchopsilopa guangdongensis Zhang & Yang & Mathis, 2012 (China)
- Rhynchopsilopa huangkengensis Zhang & Yang & Mathis, 2012 (China)
- Rhynchopsilopa jinxiuensis Zhang & Yang & Mathis, 2012 (China)
- Rhynchopsilopa laevigata Cresson, 1946 (Zimbabwe)
- Rhynchopsilopa magnicornis Hendel, 1913 (Thailand, Malaya)
- Rhynchopsilopa minor Wirth, 1968 (Mozambique)
- Rhynchopsilopa nitidissima Hendel, 1931 (Egypt) [shown to prefer ants in the genus Crematogaster]
- Rhynchopsilopa pallipes Wirth, 1968 (Republic of Congo)
- Rhynchopsilopa philippinensis Wirth, 1968 (Philippines)
- Rhynchopsilopa shixingensis Zhang & Yang & Mathis, 2012 (China)
- Rhynchopsilopa struckenbergi Wirth, 1968 (Mozambique, Zimbabwe)
- Rhynchopsilopa trautae Wirth, 1968 (Tanzania)
