= Eucerceris canaliculata =

Scientific classification
- Domain: Eukaryota
- Kingdom: Animalia
- Phylum: Arthropoda
- Class: Insecta
- Order: Hymenoptera
- Family: Philanthidae
- Genus: Eucerceris
- Species: E. canaliculata

Binomial name
- Eucerceris canaliculata (Say, 1823)

Synonyms
- Aphilanthops marginipennis Cameron, 1890; Cerceris bidentata Say, 1823; Cerceris marginipennis (Cameron, 1890); Eucerceris biconica Scullen, 1948; Eucerceris canaliculata atronitida Scullen, 1939; Eucerceris marginipennis (Cameron, 1890); Eucerceris zimapanensis Scullen, 1968; Philanthus canaliculatus Say, 1823

Species of wasp

Eucerceris canaliculata is a species of wasp in the family Philanthidae. It is found in North America.
