= Eucerceris arenaria =

Scientific classification
- Domain: Eukaryota
- Kingdom: Animalia
- Phylum: Arthropoda
- Class: Insecta
- Order: Hymenoptera
- Family: Philanthidae
- Tribe: Cercerini
- Genus: Eucerceris
- Species: E. arenaria

Binomial name
- Eucerceris arenaria Scullen, 1948

Species of wasp

Eucerceris arenaria is a species of wasp in the family Philanthidae. It is found in North America.
