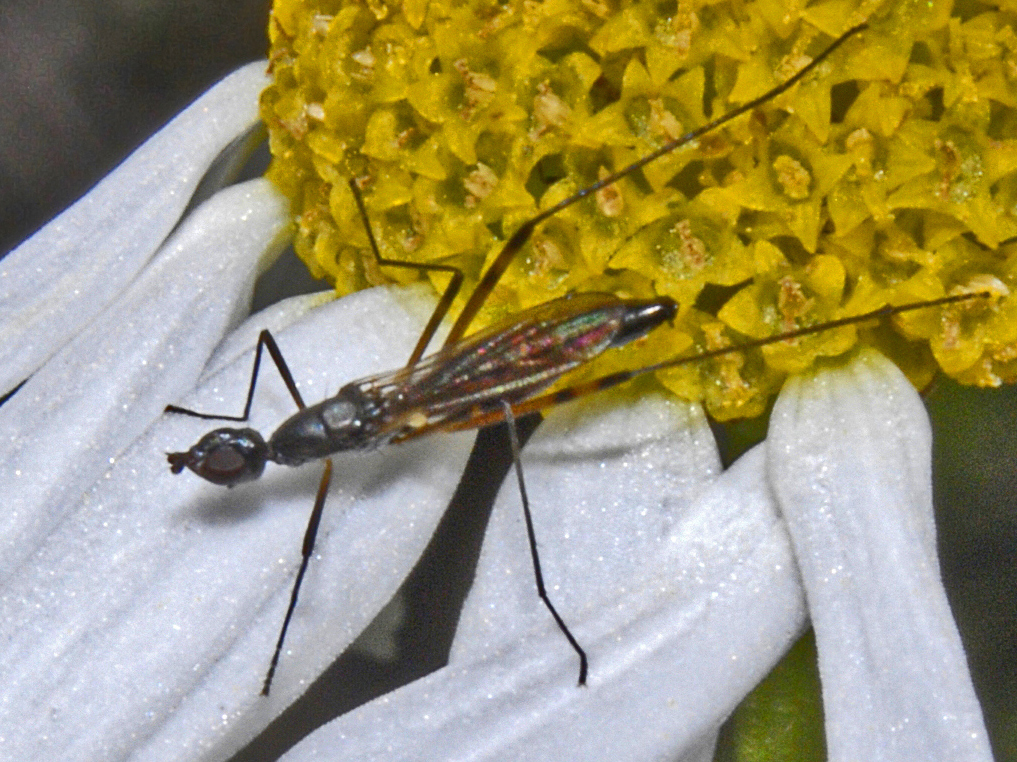
- Micropeza corrigiolata

Scientific classification
- Kingdom: Animalia
- Phylum: Arthropoda
- Class: Insecta
- Order: Diptera
- Family: Micropezidae
- Genus: Micropeza
- Species: M. corrigiolata

Binomial name
- Micropeza corrigiolata (Linnaeus, 1767)

Synonyms
- Musca filiformis Fabricius, 1794; Musca strumosa Scopoli, 1763; Tylus corrigiolata

= Micropeza corrigiolata =

Species of fly

Micropeza corrigiolata is a species of stilt-legged flies in the family Micropezidae.

== Distribution and habitat ==
This species is present in most of Europe, in the Near East, and in the Nearctic realm. These flies mainly inhabit meadows, fields, bushes, areas with leguminous plants, sparse vegetation and margins of sandy beaches.

== Description ==
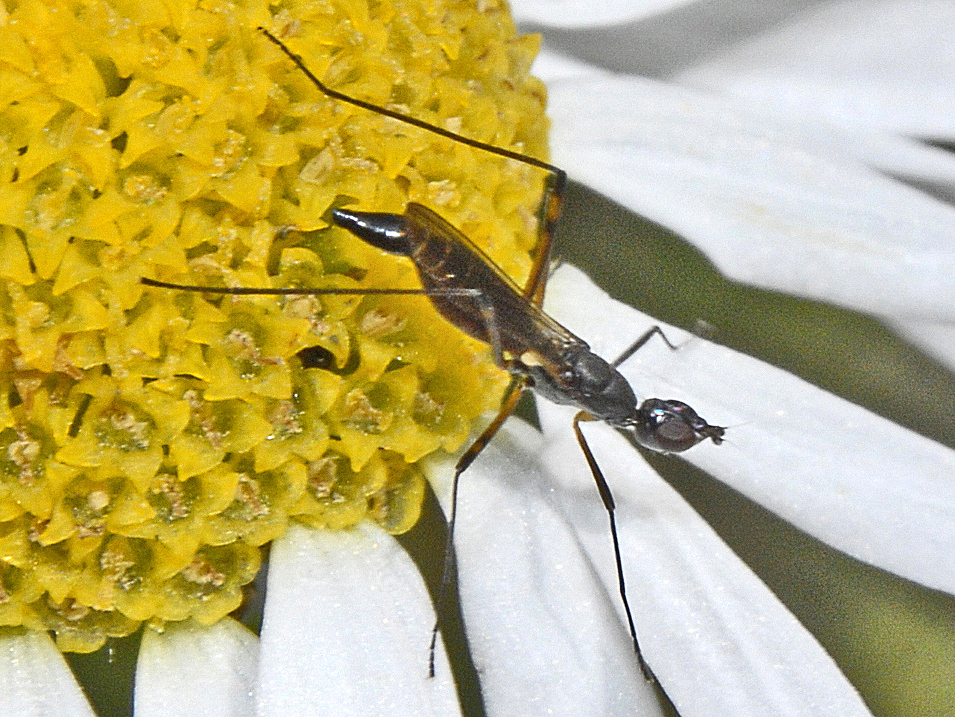
Side view

Micropeza corrigiolata can reach a length of 4–7 millimetres (0.16–0.28 in). These small and slender flies have a deep black body with a bullet-shaped head, reddish eyes and stilt-like legs. Also their abdomen is long and slender. The tergites have narrow, yellow edges. Antennae are black. Tibiae show short bristles. Wings are clear.

== Biology ==
Adults can be found from the beginning of June to the beginning of August. They mainly feed on small insects. Larvae feed on roots of various plants (Pisum arvense, Trifolium pratense, Medicago sativa).

Video clip. Female of M. corrigiolata
