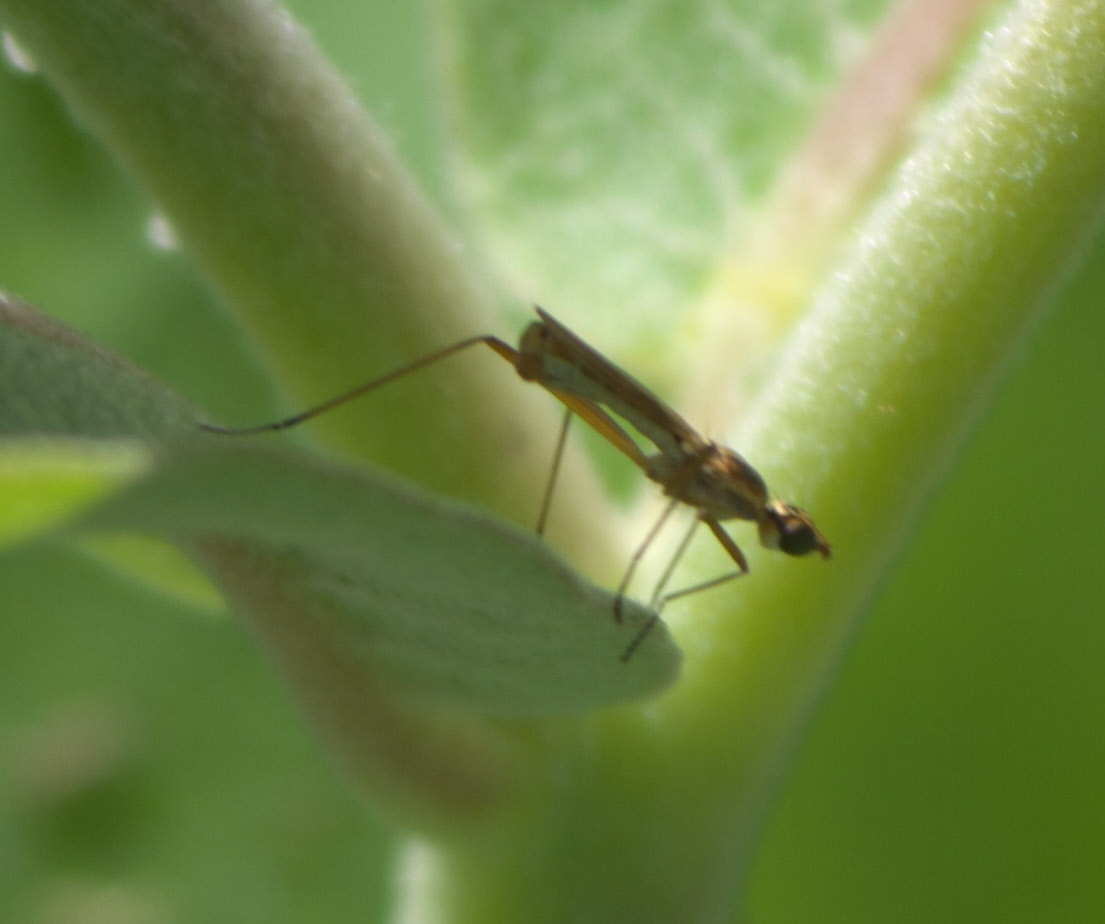
- Micropeza lineata, Colorado

Scientific classification
- Domain: Eukaryota
- Kingdom: Animalia
- Phylum: Arthropoda
- Class: Insecta
- Order: Diptera
- Family: Micropezidae
- Genus: Micropeza
- Species: M. lineata

Binomial name
- Micropeza lineata Van Duzee, 1926

= Micropeza lineata =

Species of fly

Micropeza lineata is a species of stilt-legged flies in the family Micropezidae.
