= Eucerceris =

Scientific classification
- Kingdom: Animalia
- Phylum: Arthropoda
- Class: Insecta
- Order: Hymenoptera
- Family: Philanthidae
- Tribe: Cercerini
- Genus: Eucerceris; Cresson, 1865

Type species
- Eucerceris cressoni (Schletterer, 1887)

Genus of wasps

Eucerceris is a genus of wasps in the family Philanthidae. There are more than 40 described species in Eucerceris.

== Species ==
The genus Eucerceris contains 41 extant species:

- Eucerceris angulata Rohwer, 1912
- Eucerceris arenaria Scullen, 1948
- Eucerceris atrata Scullen, 1968
- Eucerceris baccharidis Scullen, 1968
- Eucerceris barri Scullen, 1968
- Eucerceris bitruncata Scullen, 1939
- Eucerceris brunnea Scullen, 1948
- Eucerceris canaliculata (Say, 1823)
- Eucerceris cavagnaroi Scullen, 1968
- Eucerceris cerceriformis Cameron, 1891
- Eucerceris conata Scullen, 1939
- Eucerceris cressoni (Schletterer, 1887)
- Eucerceris ferruginosa Scullen, 1939
- Eucerceris flavocincta Cresson, 1865
- Eucerceris geboharti G. Ferguson, 1982
- Eucerceris lacunosa Scullen, 1939
- Eucerceris lapazensis Scullen, 1968
- Eucerceris melanosa Scullen, 1948
- Eucerceris melanovittata Scullen, 1948
- Eucerceris mellea Scullen, 1948
- Eucerceris melleoides G. Ferguson, 1982
- Eucerceris montana Cresson, 1882
- Eucerceris morula Scullen, 1968
- Eucerceris nevadensis (Dalla Torre, 1890)
- Eucerceris pacifica Scullen, 1948
- Eucerceris pimarum Cockerell & Rohwer, 1908
- Eucerceris provancheri (Dalla Torre, 1890)
- Eucerceris punctifrons (Cameron, 1890)
- Eucerceris rubripes Cresson, 1879
- Eucerceris ruficeps Scullen, 1948
- Eucerceris sculleni G. Ferguson, 1982
- Eucerceris similis Cresson, 1879
- Eucerceris sinuata Scullen, 1939
- Eucerceris sonorae Scullen, 1968
- Eucerceris stangei Scullen, 1968
- Eucerceris superba Cresson, 1865
- Eucerceris tricolor Cockerell, 1897
- Eucerceris velutina Scullen, 1948
- Eucerceris violaceipennis Scullen, 1939
- Eucerceris vittatifrons Cresson, 1879
- Eucerceris zonata (Say, 1823)
