= Micropeza bisetosa =

Scientific classification
- Domain: Eukaryota
- Kingdom: Animalia
- Phylum: Arthropoda
- Class: Insecta
- Order: Diptera
- Family: Micropezidae
- Subfamily: Micropezinae
- Genus: Micropeza
- Species: M. bisetosa

Binomial name
- Micropeza bisetosa Coquillett, 1902

Species of fly

Micropeza bisetosa is a species of stilt-legged flies in the family Micropezidae.
