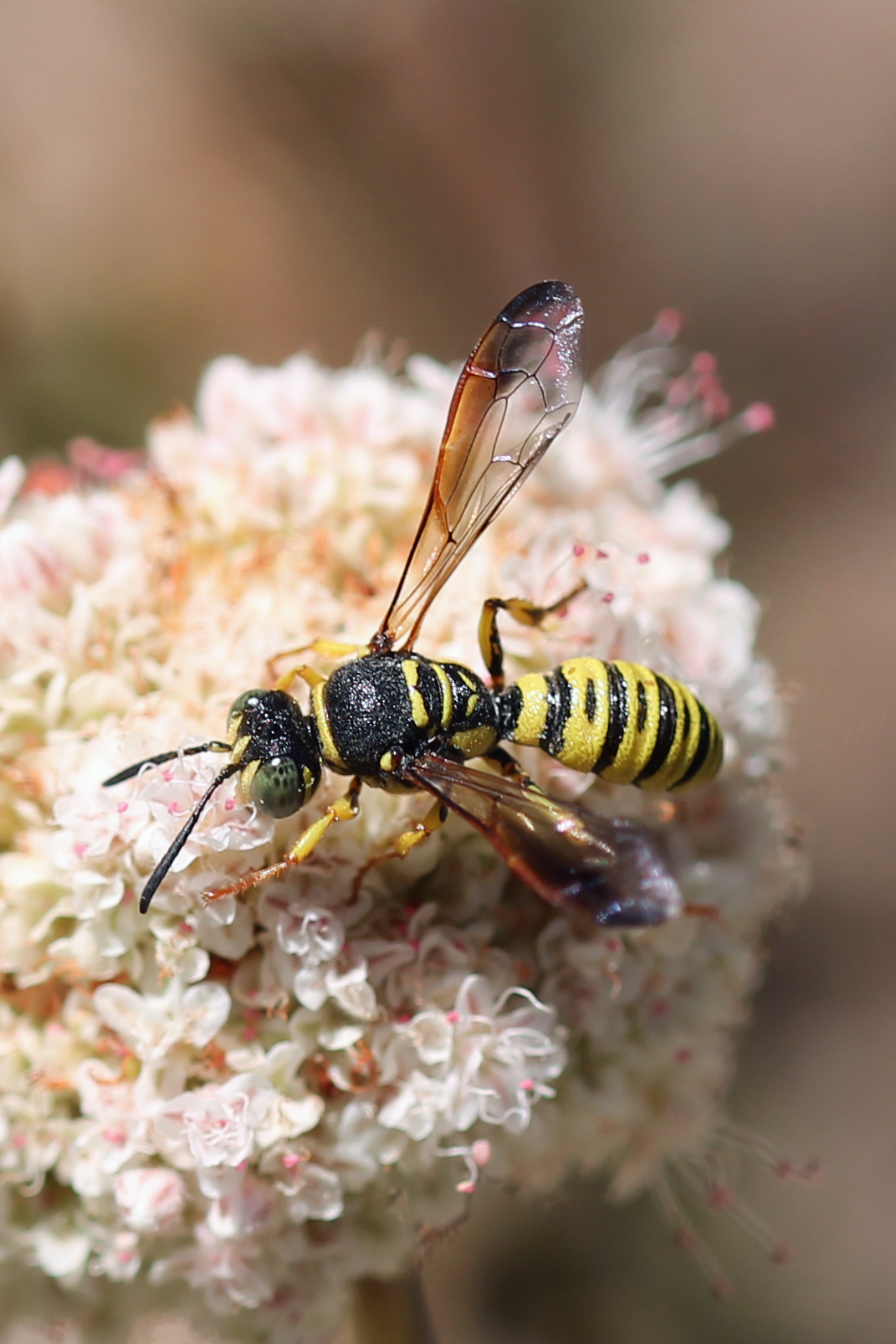

Scientific classification
- Domain: Eukaryota
- Kingdom: Animalia
- Phylum: Arthropoda
- Class: Insecta
- Order: Hymenoptera
- Family: Philanthidae
- Tribe: Cercerini
- Genus: Eucerceris
- Species: E. provancheri

Binomial name
- Eucerceris provancheri (Dalla Torre, 1890)

Synonyms
- Cerceris provancheri Dalla Torre, 1890

= Eucerceris provancheri =

Species of wasp

Eucerceris provancheri is a species of wasp in the family Philanthidae. It is found in Central America and North America.
