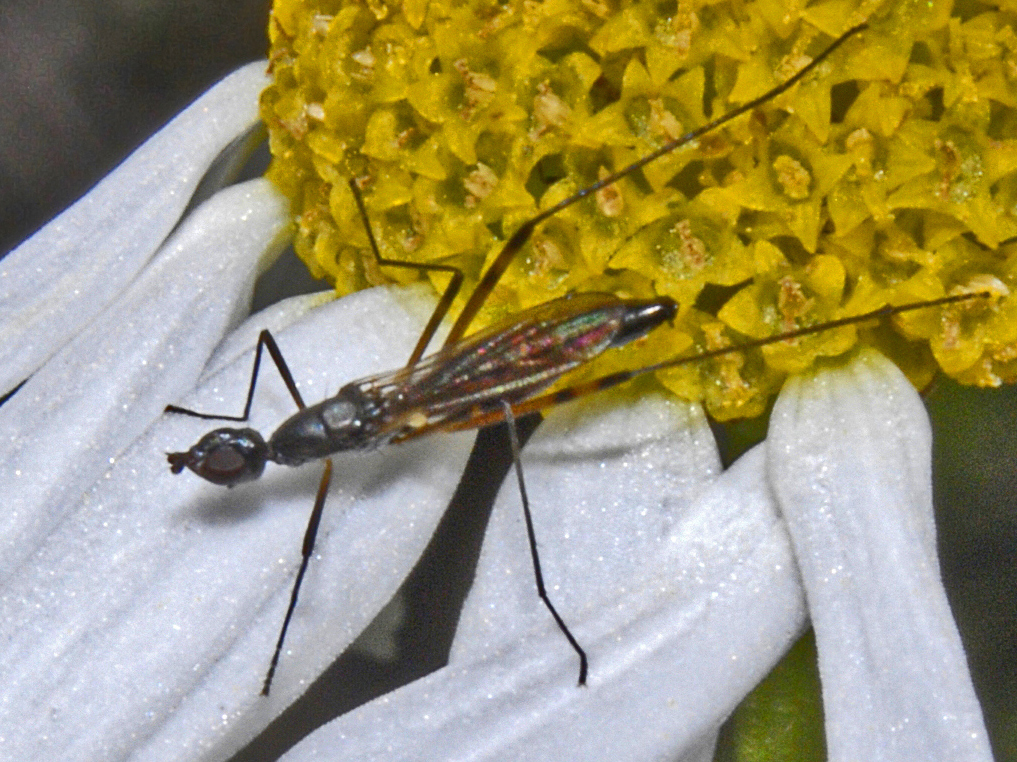
- Micropeza corrigiolata

Scientific classification
- Domain: Eukaryota
- Kingdom: Animalia
- Phylum: Arthropoda
- Class: Insecta
- Order: Diptera
- Family: Micropezidae
- Subfamily: Micropezinae
- Genus: Micropeza; Meigen, 1803

Synonyms
- Cliopeza Enderlein, 1922; Metopobrachia Enderlein, 1922; Neotylus Hendel, 1932; Neriocephalus Enderlein, 1922; Protylos Aczel, 1950; Tylos Meigen, 1800

= Micropeza =

Genus of flies

Micropeza is a genus of stilt-legged flies in the family Micropezidae.

== Description ==
These stilt-legged flies have no crossvein separating discal cells and the second basal cell of the wing. Fronto‑orbital setaeare absent. Costa is bare from base to end of subcostal vein. Occiput is very prominent and has postvertical bristles. The four posterior tibiae have small bristles.

== Species ==
Species within this genus include:

- Micropeza abnormis
- Micropeza afghanistanica
- Micropeza albiseta
- Micropeza ambigua
- Micropeza angustipennis
- Micropeza annulata
- Micropeza annulipes
- Micropeza annuliventris
- Micropeza appendiculata
- Micropeza argentiniensis
- Micropeza armipennis
- Micropeza atra
- Micropeza atripes
- Micropeza atriseta
- Micropeza biannulata
- Micropeza bilineata
- Micropeza bisetosa
- Micropeza bogotana
- Micropeza brasiliensis
- Micropeza brevipennis
- Micropeza breviradialis
- Micropeza californica
- Micropeza chillcotti
- Micropeza cinerosa
- Micropeza cingulata
- Micropeza columbiana
- Micropeza compar
- Micropeza corrigiolata
- Micropeza distenta
- Micropeza distincta
- Micropeza divisa
- Micropeza dorsalis
- Micropeza flava
- Micropeza forficuloides
- Micropeza grallatrix
- Micropeza hispanica
- Micropeza incisa
- Micropeza kawalli
- Micropeza lateralis
- Micropeza lilloi
- Micropeza limbata
- Micropeza lineata
- Micropeza littoralis
- Micropeza luteiventris
- Micropeza maculiceps
- Micropeza maculidorsum
- Micropeza marginata
- Micropeza mongolica
- Micropeza nigra
- Micropeza nigricornis
- Micropeza nigrina
- Micropeza nitidicollis
- Micropeza nitidor
- Micropeza obscura
- Micropeza pallens
- Micropeza pectoralis
- Micropeza peruana
- Micropeza pilifemur
- Micropeza planula
- Micropeza producta
- Micropeza reconditus
- Micropeza recta
- Micropeza reuniens
- Micropeza ruficeps
- Micropeza sagittifer
- Micropeza setaventris
- Micropeza similis
- Micropeza simulans
- Micropeza soosi
- Micropeza stigmatica
- Micropeza subrecta
- Micropeza sufflava
- Micropeza tabernilla
- Micropeza tarsalis
- Micropeza texana
- Micropeza thoracicum
- Micropeza tibetana
- Micropeza triannulata
- Micropeza turcana
- Micropeza unca
- Micropeza ventralis
- Micropeza verticalis
