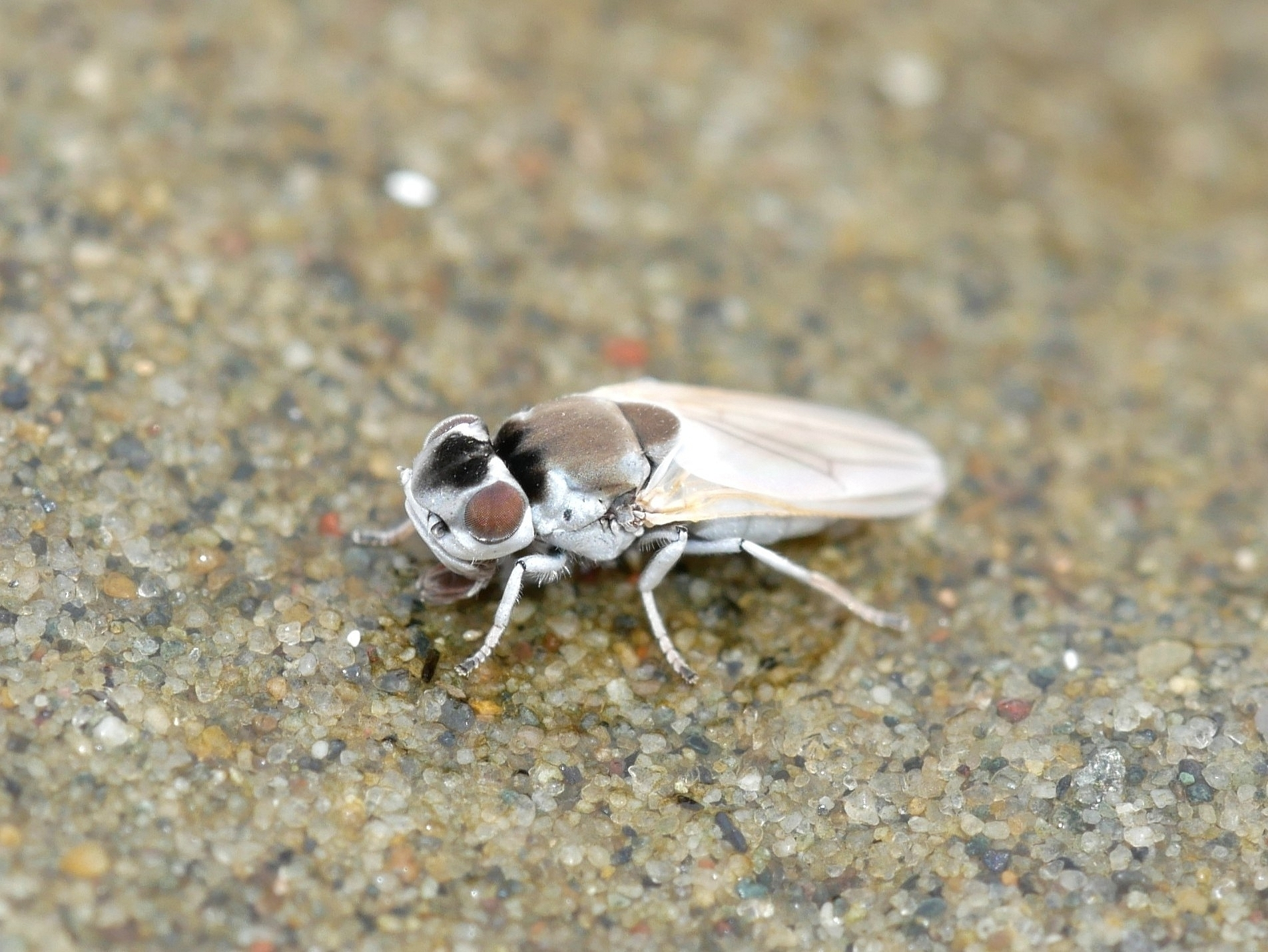
- Lipochaeta ranica

Scientific classification
- Domain: Eukaryota
- Kingdom: Animalia
- Phylum: Arthropoda
- Class: Insecta
- Order: Diptera
- Superfamily: Ephydroidea
- Family: Ephydridae
- Genus: Lipochaeta; Coquillett, 1896

= Lipochaeta (fly) =

Genus of shore flies

Lipochaeta is a genus of new world shore flies in the Ephydridae family. Only two species are part of this genus:

- Lipochaeta slossonae Coquillett, 1896, found in the Eastern United States and Central America
- Lipochaeta ranica Mathis and Trautwein, 2003, found in California and North Mexico.
