= Joseph Waltl =

German physician and naturalist

Dr. Joseph Waltl (28 July 1805 – 4 March 1888) was a German medicak doctor and naturalist.

Waltl was born in Wasserburg am Bodensee and studied at Landshut and Munich, graduating in medicine in 1819. He then travelled in Austria, France and Spain. In 1833 he became a teacher in Passau, and in 1835 a professor of natural history at the university.

His numerous writings were mainly concerned with beetles and other insects. Notably, the singular Iberian ribbed newt was named Pleurodeles waltl in honor of the young Waltl by his colleague Karl Michahelles in 1830.

In 1839 he published "Reise durch Tyrol, Oberitalien und Piemont nach dem südlichen Spanien" (Journey through Tyrol, northern Italy and the Piedmont to southern Spain). Also, he was the author of several mineralogical/geognostic works associated with Passau and its environs.
