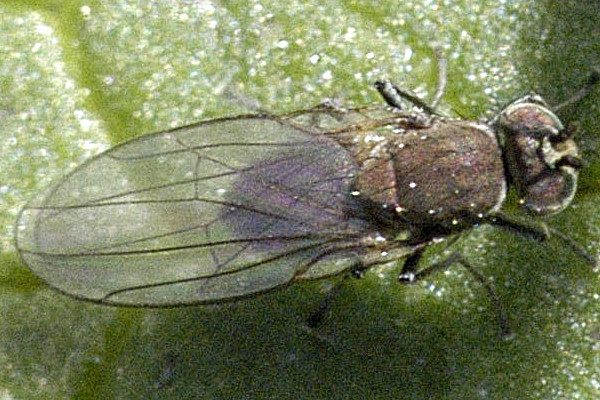
- Hydrellia

Scientific classification
- Domain: Eukaryota
- Kingdom: Animalia
- Phylum: Arthropoda
- Class: Insecta
- Order: Diptera
- Family: Ephydridae
- Subfamily: Hydrelliinae; Robineau-Desvoidy, 1830

Synonyms
- Hydropotinae

= Hydrelliinae =

Subfamily of flies

Hydrelliinae is a subfamily of shore flies in the family Ephydridae.

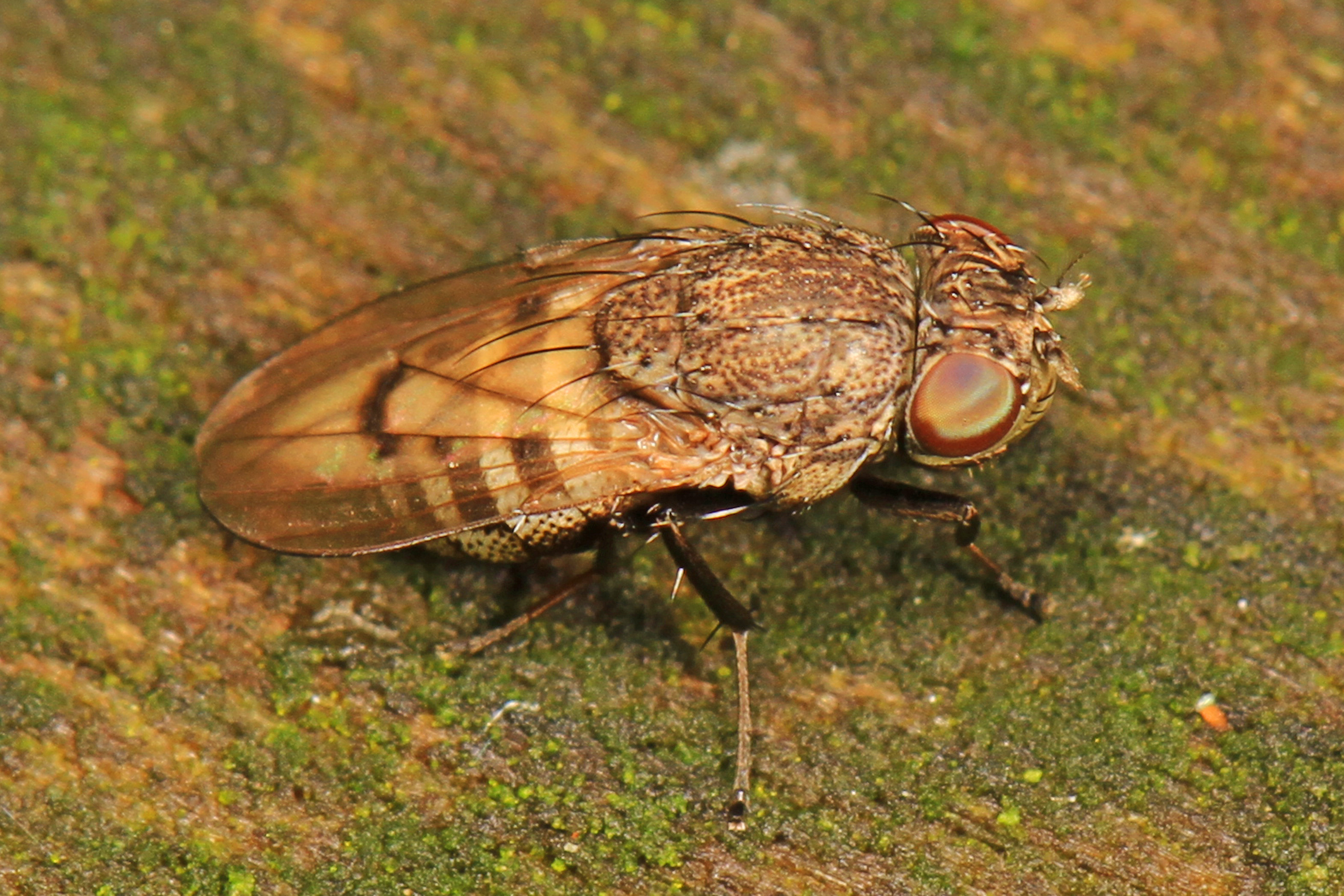
Paralimna punctipennis

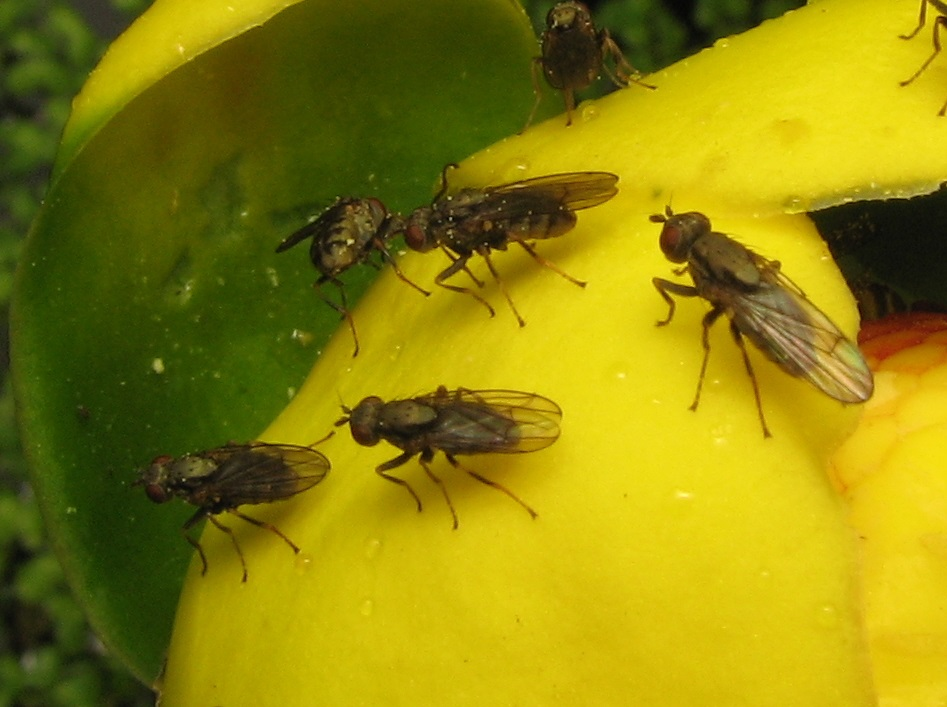
Notiphila sp.

== Genera ==
Tribe Atissini Cresson, 1942

- Asmeringa Becker, 1903
- Atissa Haliday, 1839
- Cerobothrium Frey, 1958
- Isgamera Soika, 1956
- Pelignellus Sturtevant & Wheeler, 1954
- Ptilomyia Coquillett, 1900
- Schema Becker, 1907
- Subpelignus Papp, 1983

Tribe Dryxini Zatwarnicki, 1992

- Dryxo Robineau-Desvoidy, 1830
- Oedenopiforma Cogan, 1968
- Oedenops Becker, 1903
- Omyxa Mathis & Zatwarnicki, 2002
- Papuama Mathis & Zatwarnicki, 2002
- Paralimna Loew, 1862

Tribe Hydrelliini

- Lemnaphila Cresson, 1933 (duckweed miner flies)
- Hydrellia Robineau-Desvoidy, 1830

Tribe Notiphilini Cresson, 1946

- Notiphila Fallén, 1810

- Dichaeta Meigen, 1830

Tribe Typopsilopini

- Typopsilopa Cresson, 1916

Unplaced

- Donaceus Cresson, 1943
