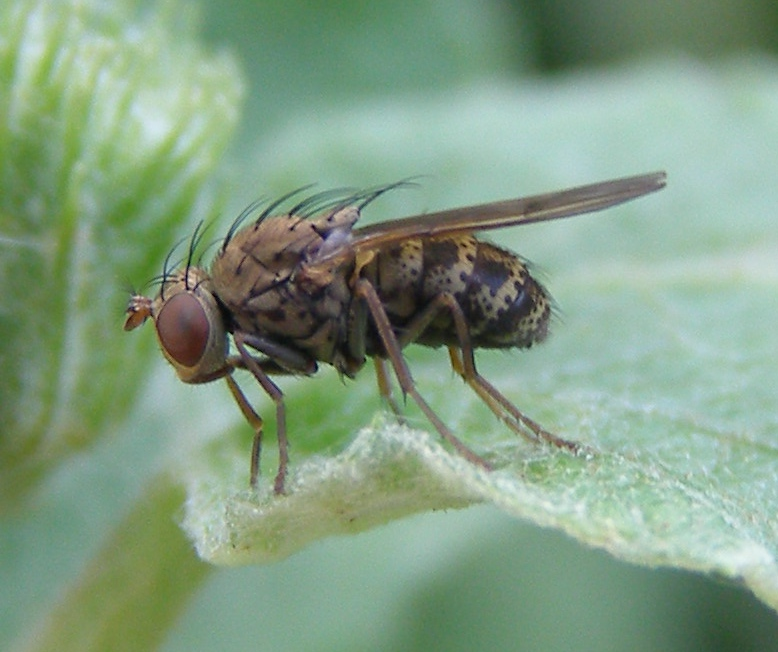

Scientific classification
- Domain: Eukaryota
- Kingdom: Animalia
- Phylum: Arthropoda
- Class: Insecta
- Order: Diptera
- Family: Ephydridae
- Subfamily: Hydrelliinae
- Tribe: Notiphilini
- Genus: Notiphila; Fallén, 1810

Diversity
- at least 160 species

= Notiphila =

Genus of shore flies

Notiphila is a genus of shore flies (insects in the family Ephydridae). There are at least 160 described species in Notiphila.

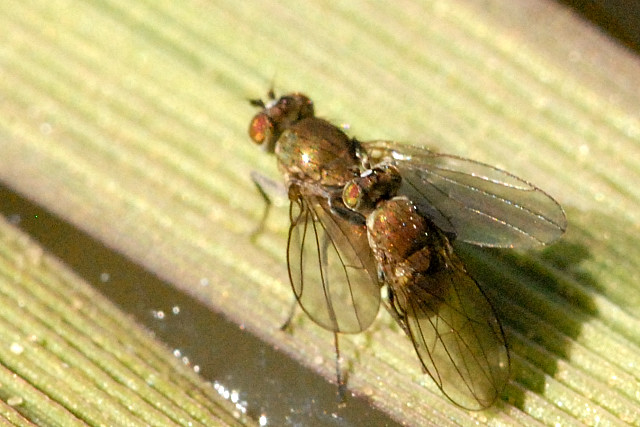

== See also ==
- List of Notiphila species

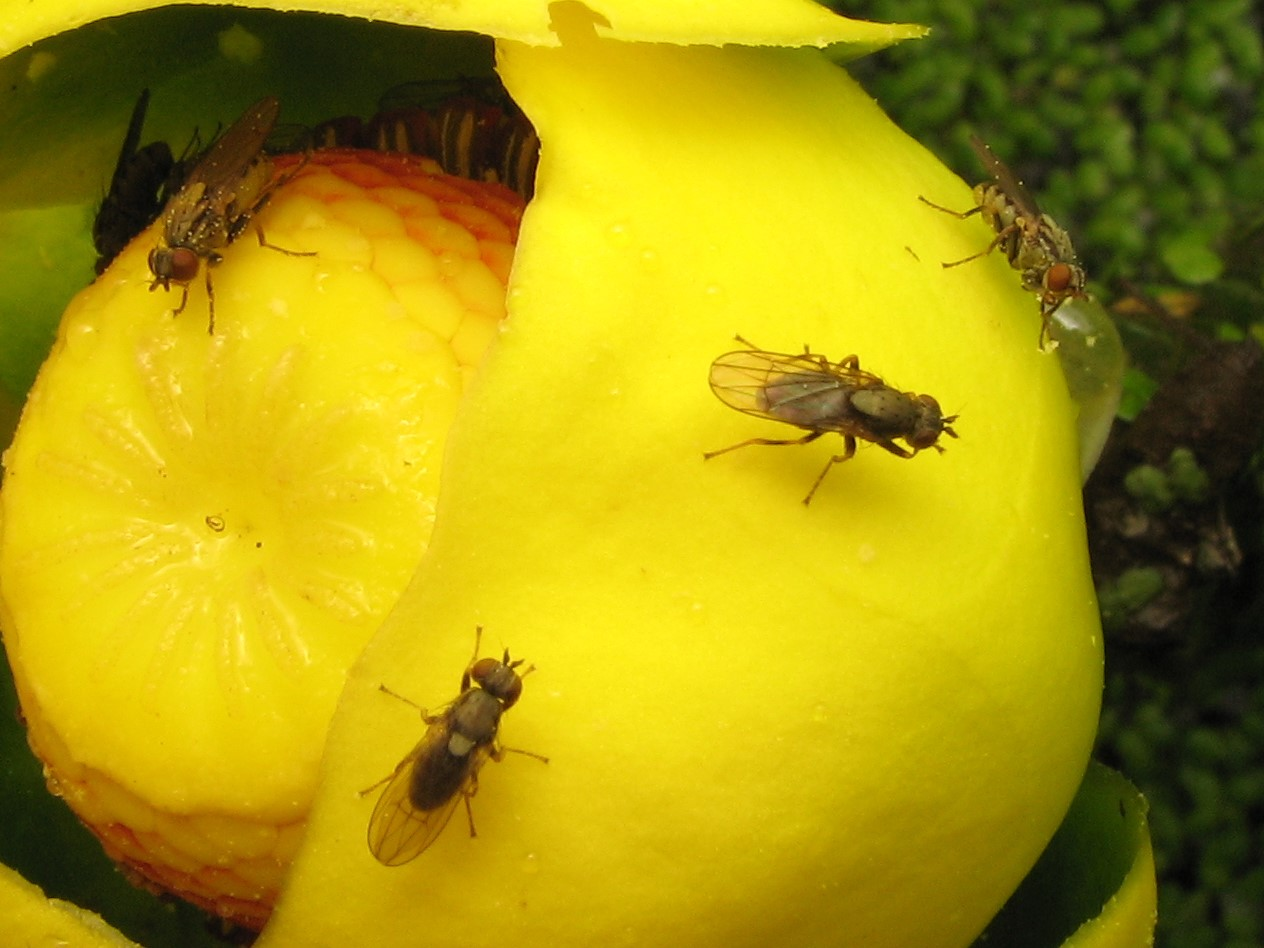
On water lily
