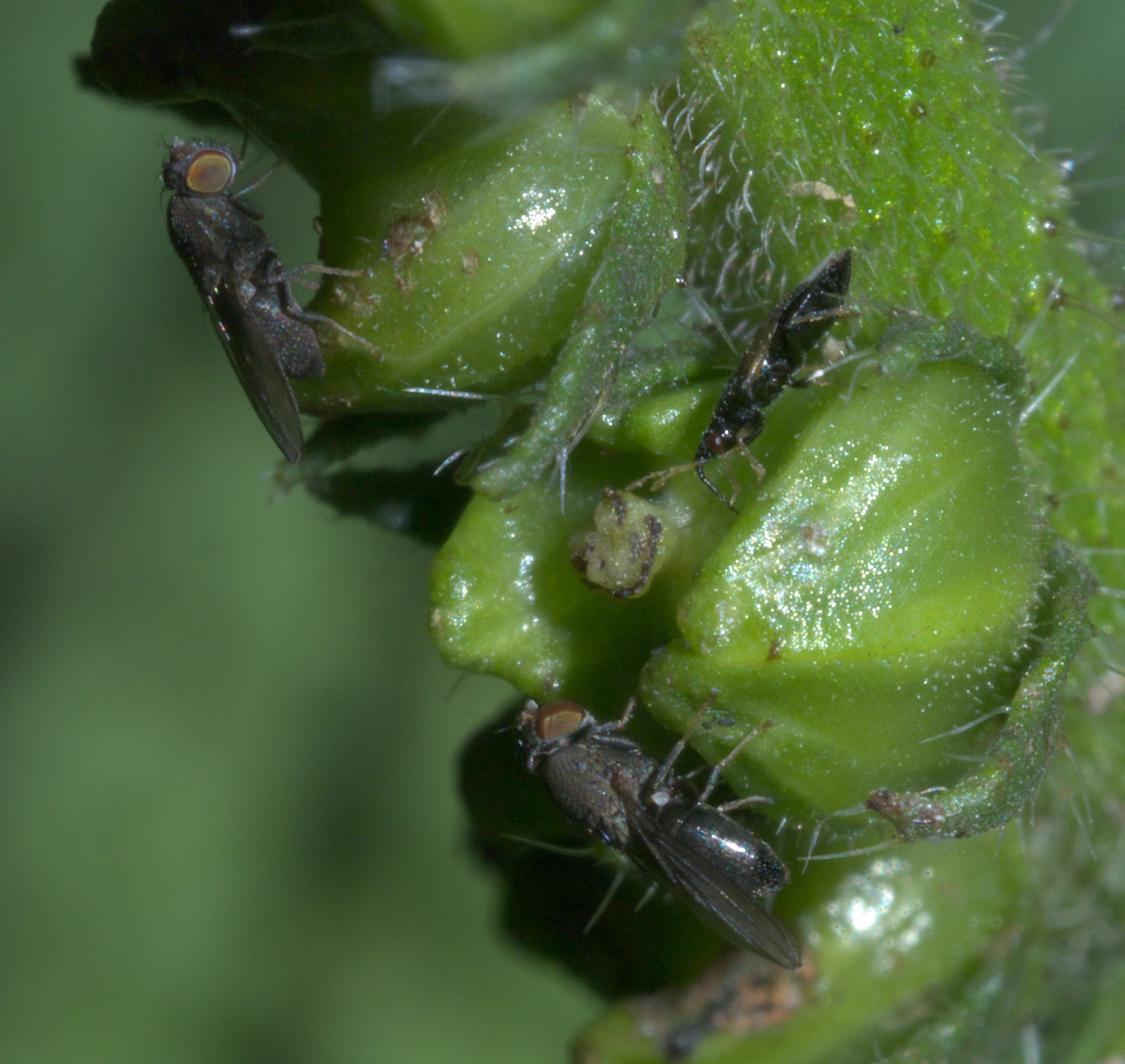

Scientific classification
- Domain: Eukaryota
- Kingdom: Animalia
- Phylum: Arthropoda
- Class: Insecta
- Order: Diptera
- Family: Ephydridae
- Subfamily: Gymnomyzinae

= Gymnomyzinae =

Subfamily of flies

Gymnomyzinae is a subfamily of shore flies in the family Ephydridae.

== Genera ==
Tribe Discocerinini Cresson, 1925

- Aquachasma Zatwarnicki, 2016
- Diclasiopa Hendel, 1917
- Discocerina Macquart, 1835
- Ditrichophora Cresson, 1924
- Gymnoclasiopa Hendel, 1930
- Hecamedoides Hendel, 1917
- Lamproclasiopa Hendel, 1933
- Pectinifer Cresson, 1944
- Polytrichophora Cresson, 1924

Tribe Gastropini

- Beckeriella Williston, 1897
- Gastrops Williston, 1897

Tribe Gymnomyzini Latreille

- Athyroglossa Loew, 1860
- Cerometopum Cresson, 1914
- Chaetomosillus Hendel, 1934
- Chlorichaeta Becker, 1922
- Gymnopiella Cresson, 1945
- Hoploaegis Cresson, 1944
- Mosillus Latreille, 1804
- Placopsidella Kertész, 1901
- Platygymnopa Wirth, 1971
- Stratiothyrea Meijere, 1913
- Trimerogastra Hendel, 1914

Tribe Hecamedini Mathis 1991

- Allotrichoma Becker, 1896
- Diphuia Cresson, 1944
- Elephantinosoma Becker, 1903
- Eremotrichoma Giordani Soika, 1956
- Hecamede Haliday in Curtis, 1837

Tribe Lipochaetini

- Glenanthe Haliday, 1839

Tribe Ochtherini Dahl

- Ochthera Latreille, 1802
