= Ezra Townsend Cresson =

American entomologist (1838–1926)

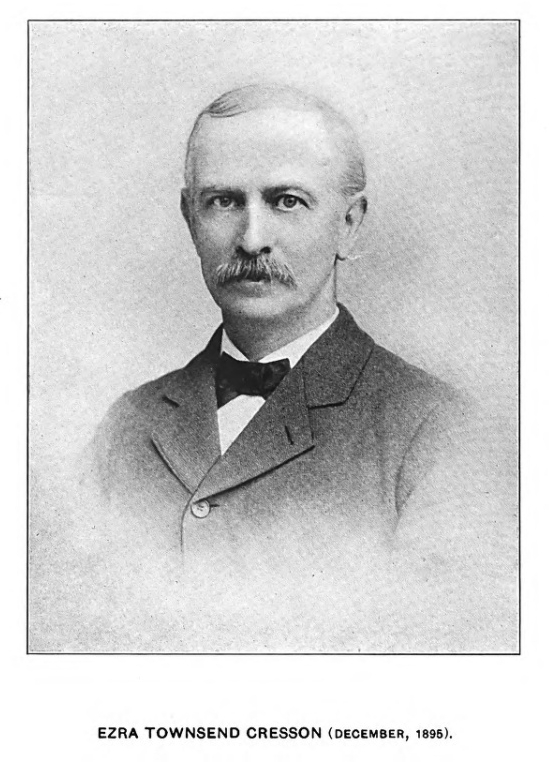
In 1895

Ezra Townsend Cresson (18 June 1838, in Byberry – 19 April 1926, in Swarthmore) was an American entomologist who specialized in the Hymenoptera order of insects. He wrote Synopsis of the families and genera of the Hymenoptera of America, north of Mexico Philadelphia: Paul C. Stockhausen, Entomological printer (1887) and many other works. Cresson also documented many new species including Nomada texana.

Cresson was born in Byberry, Bucks County, to Warder and Elizabeth Townsend. He was employed with the Franklin Fire Insurance Company from 1869, serving as its secretary until 1910. In 1859, Cresson founded the Entomological Society of Philadelphia, together with James Ridings and George Newman (1801–1876). The society was later renamed to the American Entomological Society in 1867. He served as its curator from 1866 to 1874 and as editor for its transactions from 1871 to 1912 apart from being its treasurer from 1874 to 1924. He worked on cataloguing the hymenoptera of North America. He was also involved in editing the first economic entomology periodical in North America, the "Monthly Bulletin of the Entomological Society of Philadelphia for gratuitous distribution among Farmers and Agriculturists", from 1865 to 1866.

Cresson married Mary Ann Ridings, daughter of James Ridings. They had four sons and a daughter. Two of their sons, George Bringhurst Cresson (1859–1919) and Ezra Townsend Cresson, Jr. (1876–1948), were also entomologists and members of the American Entomological Society. George B. Cresson was a general naturalist and specialist in ants, and Ezra T. Cresson Jr. was a specialist in Diptera.

== See also ==
- Category:Taxa named by Ezra Townsend Cresson

== Sources ==
- Essig, E. O. 1931 A History of Entomology. -New York, Macmillan Company.
- Mallis, A. 1971 American Entomologists. Rutgers Univ. Press New Brunswick 343-348, Portr.
- Osborn, H. 1937 Fragments of Entomological History Including Some Personal Recollections of Men and Events. Columbus, Ohio, Published by the Author.
- Osborn, H. 1952 A Brief History of Entomology Including Time of Demosthenes and Aristotle to Modern Times with over Five Hundred Portraits.
