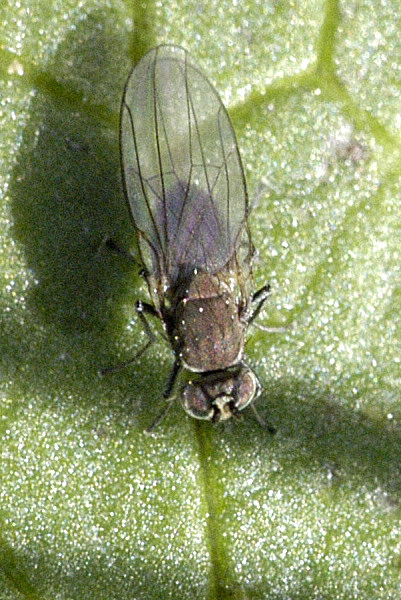
- Hydrellia griseola

Scientific classification
- Kingdom: Animalia
- Phylum: Arthropoda
- Clade: Pancrustacea
- Class: Insecta
- Order: Diptera
- Superfamily: Ephydroidea
- Family: Ephydridae; Zetterstedt, 1837

Subfamilies and tribes
- Discomyzinae: tribe Discomyzini; tribe Psilopini; Ephydrinae: tribe Dagini; tribe Ephydrini; tribe Parydrini; tribe Scatellini; Gymnomyzinae: tribe Discocerinini; tribe Gymnomyzini; tribe Hecamedini; tribe Lipochaetini; tribe Ochtherini; Hydrelliinae: tribe Atissini; tribe Dryxini; tribe Hydrelliini; tribe Notiphilini; tribe Typopsilopini; Ilytheinae: tribe Hyadinini; tribe Ilytheini

= Ephydridae =

Family of flies

Ephydridae (shore flies, sometimes brine flies) is a family of insects in the order Diptera. Shore flies are tiny flies that can be found near seashores or at smaller inland waters, such as ponds. About 2,000 species have been described worldwide, including Ochthera.

The petroleum fly, Helaeomyia petrolei, is the only known insect whose larvae live in naturally occurring crude petroleum. Another notable species is Ephydra hians which lives in vast number at Mono Lake.

== Description ==
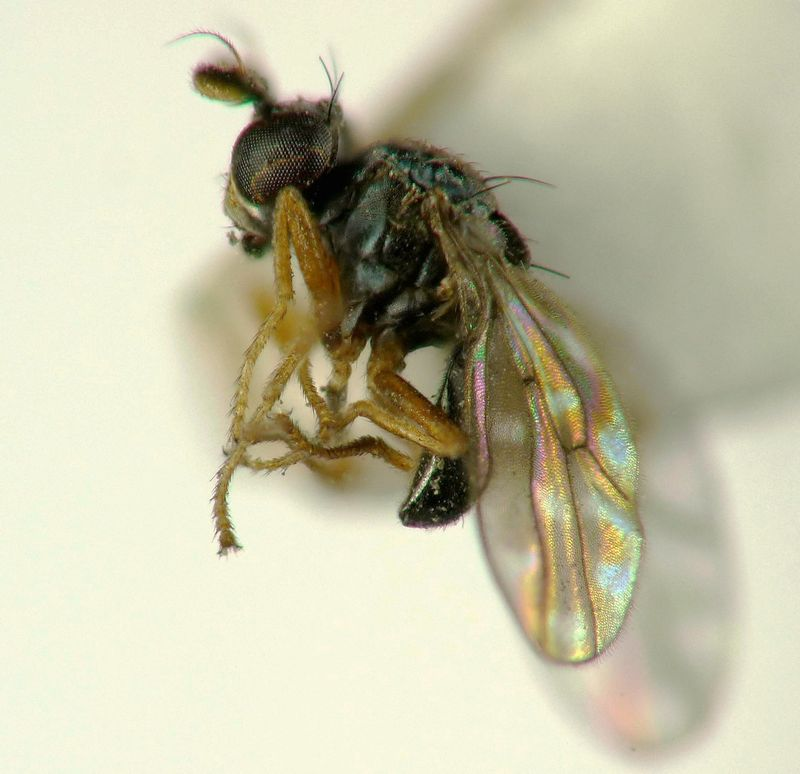
Hyadina pulchella note the patterned wings, wide mouth and (on upper side) plumose arista

Discomyza wing veins

Limnellia quadrata on Urtica video

The flies are minute to small (0.9 to 7.0 mm), with black or gray colorations. Wings are sometimes patterned. Costa with two interruptions are present in first section, near the humeral cross-vein and again near the end of vein 1. The second basal cell is not separated from the discal cell. Arista are bare or with hairs on the upper side (plumose on the upper side). The mouth opening is very large in some species. The ratio of vertical diameter of eye and height of gena (face index) is widely used in identification of individual species.

== Larvae ==
In the tribe Notiphilini the head is reduced to a cephalic skeleton, there are no anterior spiracles and the posterior spiracles are extended as spines. The other taxa have larvae similar to the Sciomyzidae, with the posterior spiracles at the apices of divergent branches from a common base. They may be differentiated by short thoracic segments (like the abdominal ones) and by the absence of a ventral arch linking the mouth hooks.

== Habitats ==
Ephydridae occupy a diverse array of seashore and wetland habitats including hot springs, petroleum pools, salt pools, alkaline lakes, marshes. Imago are phytophagous, sometimes feeding on microscopic algae and bacteria (Paracoenia, Ephydra), or predatory (Ochthera, Ephydrinae). As larvae, many are phytophagous, grazing on aquatic plants (including cultivated rice), others are algal grazers or saprophagous. Larvae of Trimerina are predatory. Some species are an important food source for other animals. Others cause damage to agricultural crops.

Larvae of some Ephydridae live in very unusual habitats. For example, Ephydra brucei lives in hot springs and geysers where the water temperature exceeds 45 degrees Celsius; some Scatella live in hot sulphur springs; Helaeomyia petrolei develops in pools of crude oil; and Ephydra gracilis, the brine fly proper, in pools with very high concentrations of salt. Some have public health significance being associated with sewage filter beds and septic tanks. Flies develop in moist soils or mine leaves of aquatic, subaquatic, and rarely dry soil (Hydrellia) plants. Flies are found near water along coasts, among aquatic vegetation and sometimes on water surfaces (Ephydra).

== Phylogeny ==
- Ephydroidea
  - Curtonotidae
  - - Drosophilidae+Camillidae
    - - Ephydridae
      - Diastatidae sensu lato

McAlpine (1989)

- Ephydroidea
  - - Curtonotidae+Drosophilidae
  - - Campichoetidae
    - - Ephydridae+Camillidae
      - Diastatidae

Grimaldi (1990)

== See also ==
- List of Ephydridae genera
