= Psilopa =

- Psilopa cf nitidula

Scientific classification
- Kingdom: Animalia
- Phylum: Arthropoda
- Clade: Pancrustacea
- Class: Insecta
- Order: Diptera
- Family: Ephydridae
- Subfamily: Discomyzinae
- Tribe: Psilopini
- Genus: Psilopa; Fallen, 1823

Type species
- Notiphila nitidula Fallen, 1823

Synonyms
- Hygrella Haliday, 1839; Ephygrobia Schiner, 1862; Diasemocera Bezzi, 1895; Domina Hutton, 1901; Discocerinella Mercier, 1927

Genus of flies

Psilopa is a genus of flies. The Petroleum fly, the only known insect to develop in naturally occurring crude oil, was once placed in this genus but then transferred elsewhere, as Helaeomyia., but later as Diasemocera petrolei (Coquillett, 1899).

== Species ==
- Psilopa aeneonigra
- Psilopa aequalipes
- Psilopa aethiopiae
- Psilopa africana
- Psilopa angola
- Psilopa antennata
- Psilopa apicalis
- Psilopa atlantica
- Psilopa clara
- Psilopa composita
- Psilopa compta
- Psilopa confentei
- Psilopa desmata
- Psilopa dupla
- Psilopa elsa
- Psilopa fannya
- Psilopa fisseli
- Psilopa flavescens
- Psilopa flaviantennalis
- Psilopa flavida
- Psilopa flavimanus
- Psilopa fratella
- Psilopa gigantea
- Psilopa gracilis
- Psilopa grisescens
- Psilopa iceryae
- Psilopa insolita
- Psilopa irregularis
- Psilopa loewi
- Psilopa mackiei
- Psilopa meneghinii
- Psilopa mentita
- Psilopa metallica
- Psilopa nana
- Psilopa nervimaculata
- Psilopa nigricornis
- Psilopa nigrifacies
- Psilopa nigrina
- Psilopa nigritella
- Psilopa nigrithorax
- Psilopa nilotica
- Psilopa nitidifacies
- Psilopa nitidissima
- Psilopa nitidula Fallen, 1823
- Psilopa obscuripes
- Psilopa ovaliformis
- Psilopa pappi
- Psilopa pectinata
- Psilopa polita
- Psilopa pulchripes
- Psilopa pulicaria
- Psilopa punica
- Psilopa quadratula
- Psilopa radiolata
- Psilopa roederi
- Psilopa rufibasis
- Psilopa rufipes
- Psilopa rufithorax
- Psilopa rutilans
- Psilopa senegalensis
- Psilopa sinensis
- Psilopa singaporensis
- Psilopa thora
- Psilopa tonsa
- Psilopa urbana
- Psilopa victoria
- Psilopa violacea

Else for Psilopa bornholmi, Psilopa girschneri, Psilopa leucostoma (Meigen, 1830), Psilopa marginella Psilopa martima see Diasemocera
