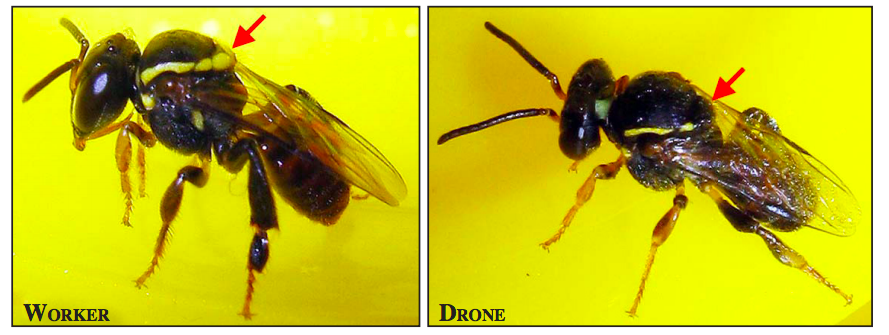
- Worker (left) and drone (right). The red arrows point at the characteristic yellow patch on the side of the thorax missing in the males.

Scientific classification
- Kingdom: Animalia
- Phylum: Arthropoda
- Class: Insecta
- Order: Hymenoptera
- Family: Apidae
- Genus: Austroplebeia
- Species: A. cincta

Binomial name
- Austroplebeia cincta (Mocsáry, 1898)
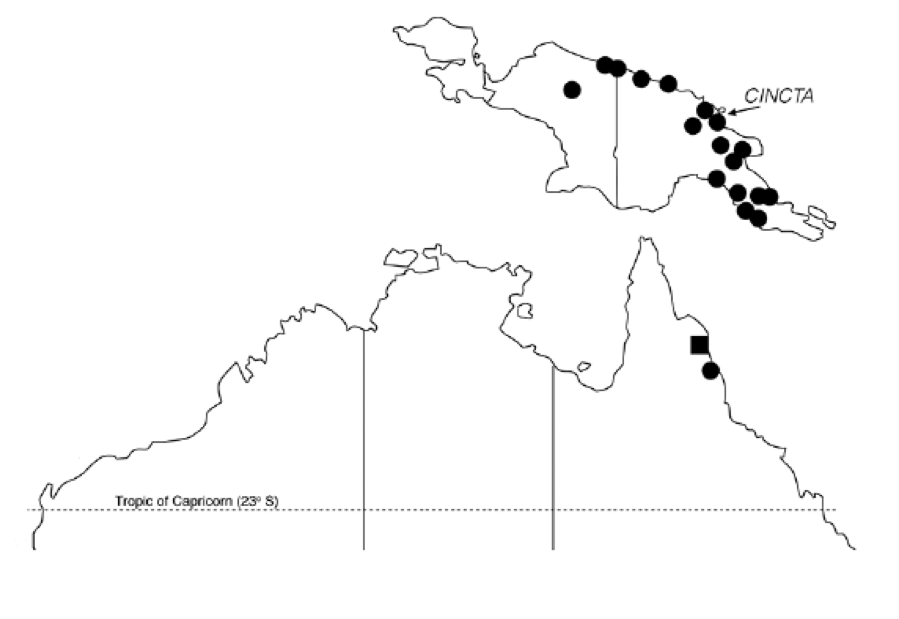
- Estimated current distribution of A. cincta in Australia and New Guinea

Synonyms
- Trigona cincta Mocsáry, 1898

= Austroplebeia cincta =

Species of bee

Austroplebeia cincta is a small eusocial stingless bee first described by Mocsáry in 1898 and it is found across Australia (far North Queensland), West Papua, and Papua New Guinea (East and Centre).

== Description and identification ==
The workers (3–4.3 mm in Papua New Guinea and 3–3.5 mm in Australia) can be distinguished by their body pilosity and broad yellow bands on the top of their thorax similar to A. essingtoni. The hair in the face and other parts of the thorax is much finer than other species. They have bold yellow markings in the face and a yellow patch on the side of the thorax making them easy to tell apart from other species. Most of the times is vivid yellow, but it can also range from dark yellow to reddish brown. Unlike the rest of Austroplebeia species, the males are darker than the workers, lacking the thorax markings.

== Nest building ==
The brood chamber is distinctive where new brood cells are waxed together into concentric layers different to other species of Austroplebeia in which the brood chambers are loosely connected to one-another forming an irregular network. A. cincta also builds very long entrance tunnels (17–43 cm) to avoid predation by ants. In difference to other species of Austroplebeia, A. cincta does not construct a mesh of resin droplets around the entrance. One exemption is when the nest is being threatened by predators such as green ants in which case, the bees would build a full or partial closure over their tunnel entrance.

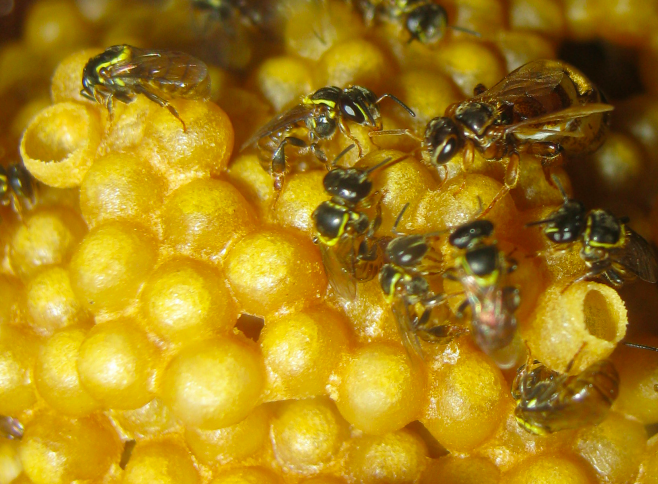
Clustered brood comb of A. cincta. The queen is in the top right corner surrounded by workers

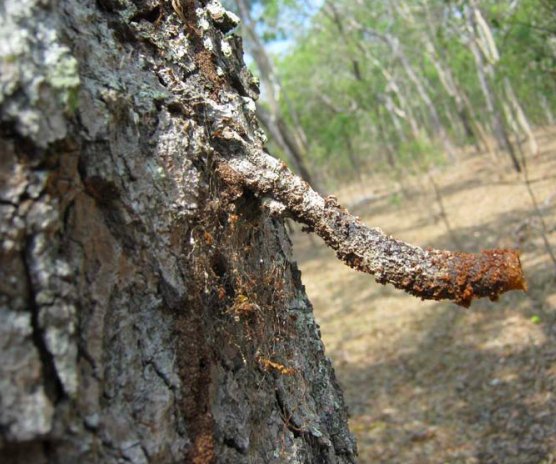
Nest entrance tunnel of A. cincta in far North Queensland, Australia
