= Leptopsilopa atrimana =

Scientific classification
- Kingdom: Animalia
- Phylum: Arthropoda
- Class: Insecta
- Order: Diptera
- Family: Ephydridae
- Subfamily: Discomyzinae
- Tribe: Psilopini
- Genus: Leptopsilopa
- Species: L. atrimana

Binomial name
- Leptopsilopa atrimana (Loew, 1878)

Synonyms
- Psilopa atrimana Loew, 1878

Species of fly

Leptopsilopa atrimana is a species of shore flies in the family Ephydridae.

== Distribution ==
Canada, United States, Mexico, Guatemala.
