= Trimerina madizans =

Scientific classification
- Kingdom: Animalia
- Phylum: Arthropoda
- Class: Insecta
- Order: Diptera
- Family: Ephydridae
- Subfamily: Discomyzinae
- Tribe: Psilopini
- Genus: Trimerina
- Species: T. madizans

Binomial name
- Trimerina madizans (Fallén, 1813)

Synonyms
- Notiphila madizans Fallén, 1813; Hydrellia lepida Meigen, 1838; Notiphila nigella Meigen, 1830; Notiphila rufipes Meigen, 1830

Species of fly

Trimerina madizans is a species of shore flies, insects in the family Ephydridae.

== Biology ==
The larvae are predators of spider eggs.

== Distribution ==
Algeria, Austria, Belgium, Bulgaria, Czech Republic, Finland.
