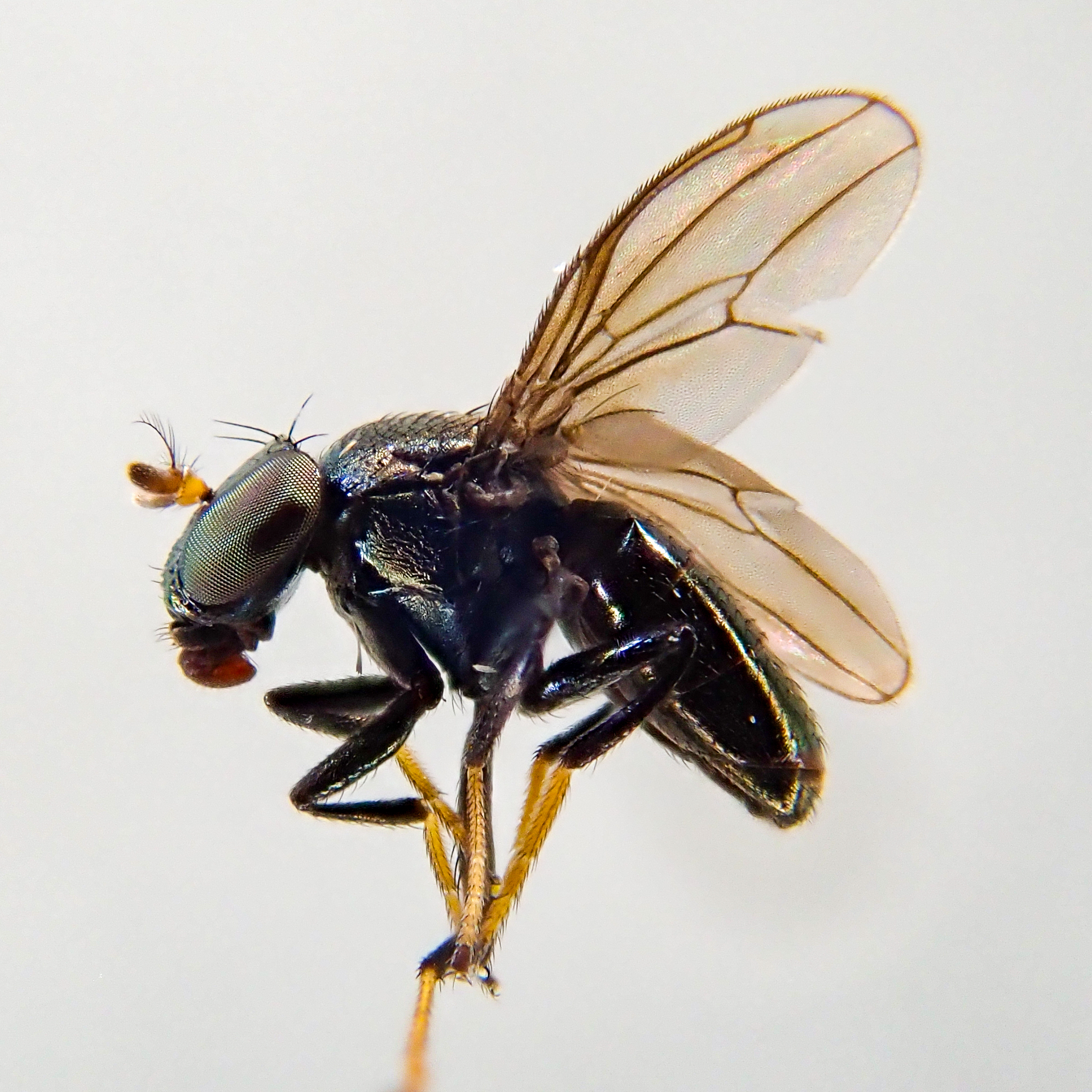
- Adult

Scientific classification
- Kingdom: Animalia
- Phylum: Arthropoda
- Class: Insecta
- Order: Diptera
- Family: Ephydridae
- Subfamily: Discomyzinae
- Tribe: Psilopini
- Genus: Clanoneurum
- Species: C. cimiciforme

Binomial name
- Clanoneurum cimiciforme (Haliday, 1855)

Synonyms
- Discomyza cimiciforme Haliday, 1855; Cyclocephala margininervis Strobl, 1902; Clanoneurum infumatum Becker, 1903

= Clanoneurum cimiciforme =

Species of fly

Clanoneurum cimiciforme is a species of fly in the family Ephydridae. It is found in the Palearctic.

== Distribution ==
Belgium, Bulgaria, Czech Republic, Canary Islands, Egypt, France, Italy
