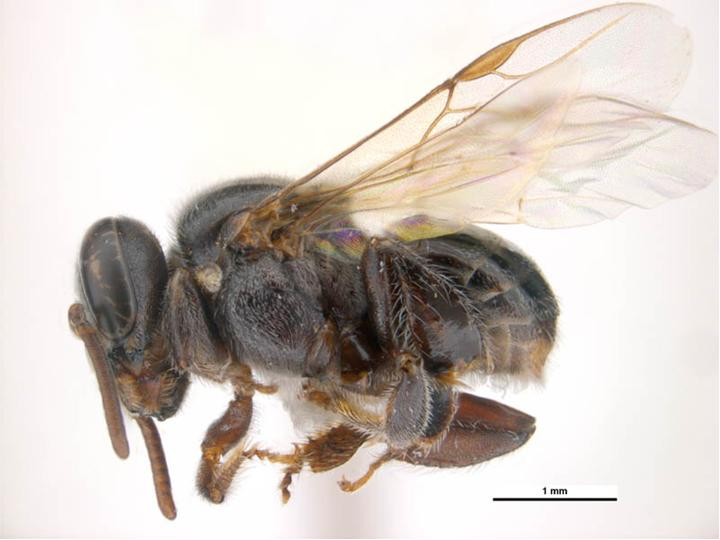
- Female Austroplebeia australis

Scientific classification
- Kingdom: Animalia
- Phylum: Arthropoda
- Clade: Pancrustacea
- Class: Insecta
- Order: Hymenoptera
- Family: Apidae
- Tribe: Meliponini
- Genus: Austroplebeia; Moure, 1961

= Austroplebeia =

Genus of insects

Austroplebeia is a stingless bee (Meliponini) genus in the family Apidae. The genus was erected by Jesus Santiago Moure in 1961. The genus comprises five described species endemic to Australia and New Guinea. Austroplebeia are more closely related to the African stingless bees than rest of the species found in Asia and Australia.

The species of Austroplebeia are difficult to separate reliably by body size or morphology except for A. cincta which can be distinguished readily by its colouration and pilosity. There are also few differences in their nest structures. This has hindered taxonomic studies to date and no workable key exists for the Austroplebeia species.

All species are small, black and robust (length: 3.0–4.9 mm) and differ from other stingless bee species that co-occur in the same region (i.e. Tetragonula, Platytrigona, Papuatrigona) by the presence of cream or yellow markings in their head and thorax. Most species construct their nests largely from wax, unlike most stingless bees, they use propolis sparingly. They construct a fine, lacy curtain of resin droplets over their nest entrance at night in order to protect against ants and other predators.

In Australia, people keep these bees in logs or wooden hives made of boxes. They show potential as pollinators of both field and greenhouse crops

== Species ==
In alphabetical order:

- Austroplebeia australis (Friese, 1898)
- Austroplebeia cassiae (Cockerell, 1910)
- Austroplebeia cincta (Mocsáry, 1898)
- Austroplebeia essingtoni (Cockerell, 1905)
- Austroplebeia fujianica (Engel, 2021)
- Austroplebeia magna (Dollin, Dollin, & Rasmussen, 2015)

== Gallery ==
Austroplebeia worker faces

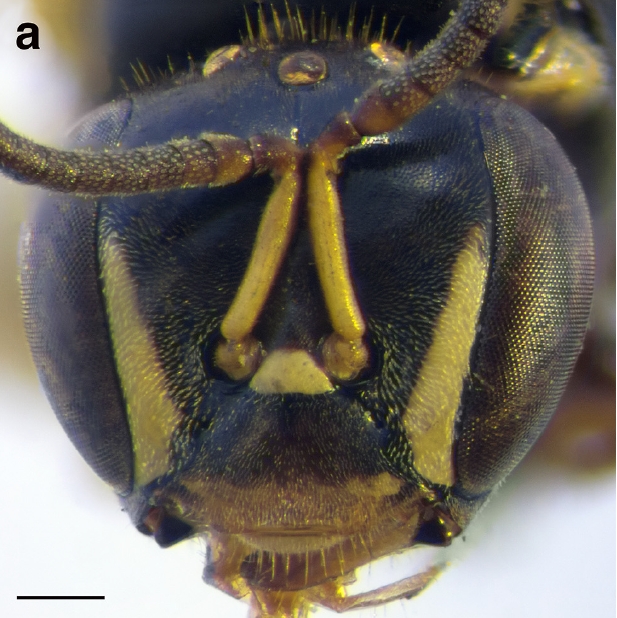
A. cincta (New Guinea population) worker face. Scale bar = 0.25 mm

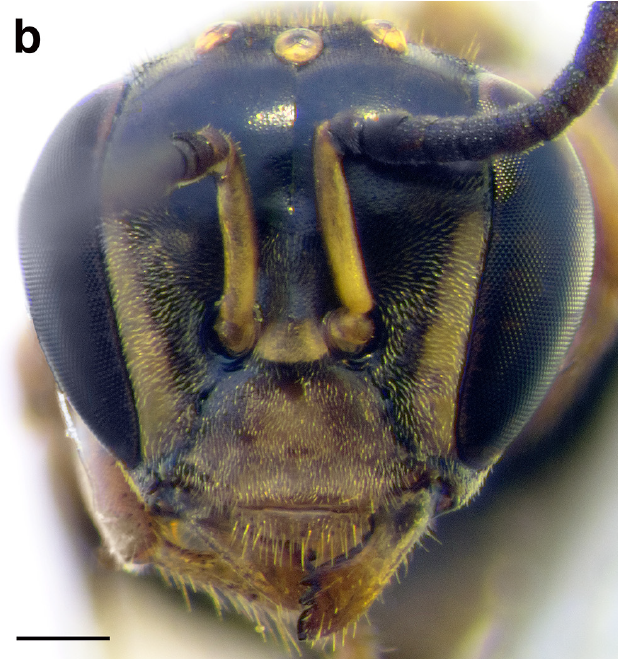
A. cincta (Queensland population) worker face. Scale bar = 0.25 mm

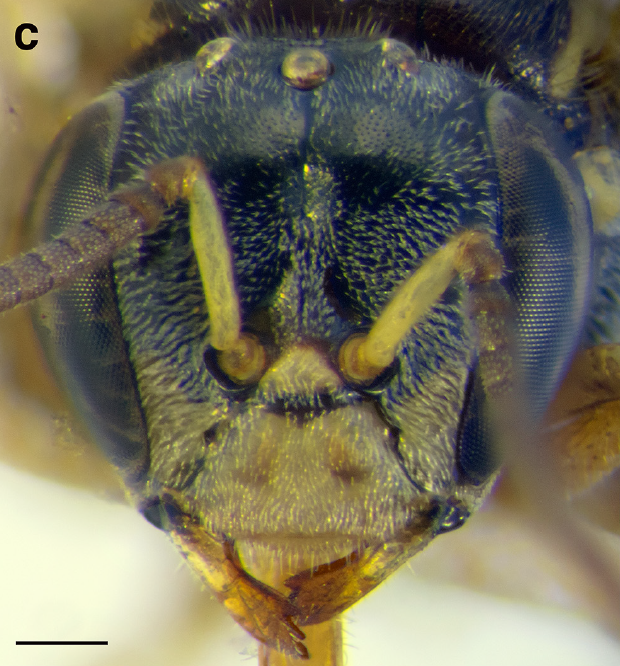
A. essingtoni worker face. Scale bar = 0.25 mm

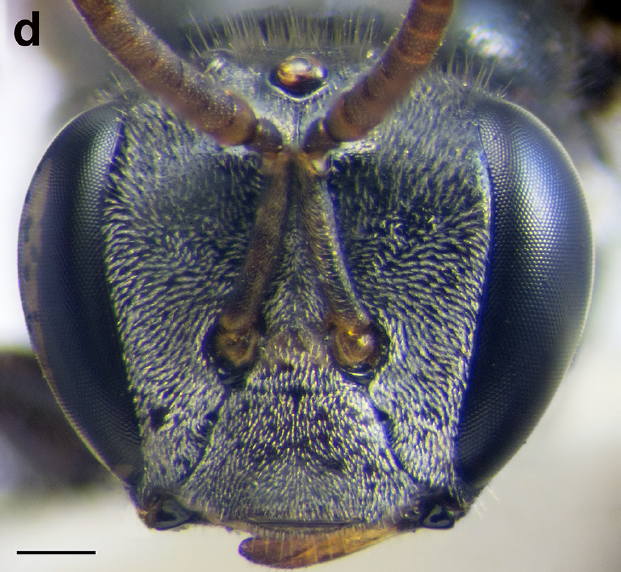
A. australis worker face. Scale bar = 0.25 mm

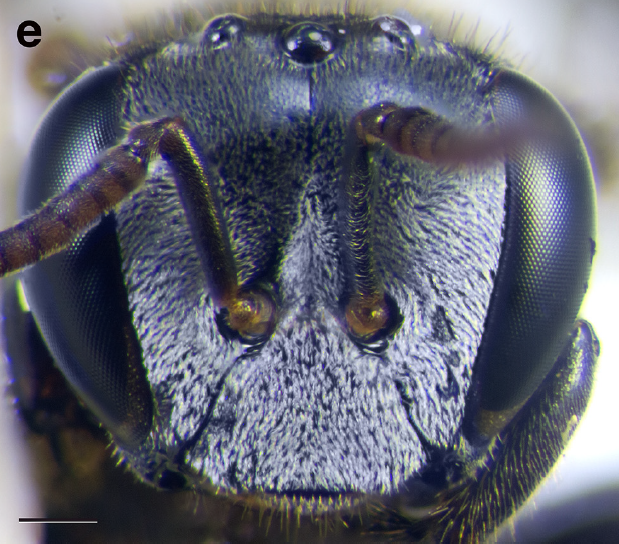
A. cassiae worker face. Scale bar = 0.25 mm

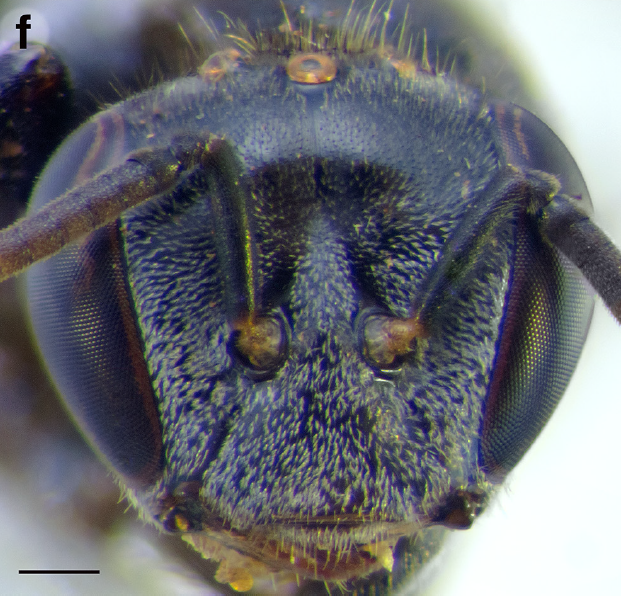
A. magna worker face. Scale bar = 0.25 mm
