= Actocetor afrus =

Scientific classification
- Kingdom: Animalia
- Phylum: Arthropoda
- Clade: Pancrustacea
- Class: Insecta
- Order: Diptera
- Family: Ephydridae
- Subfamily: Discomyzinae
- Tribe: Discomyzini
- Genus: Actocetor
- Species: A. afrus

Binomial name
- Actocetor afrus Dikow and Mathis, 2002

Species of shore fly

Actocetor afrus is a species of fly of the family Ephydridae. It was described by Torsten Dikow and Wayne N. Mathis in 2002. It is found in Liberia and Senegal.

== Description ==
The arista has 9 to 12 dorsal rays. The gena-to-eye ratio is 0.25 to 0.28. The thorax is tannish grey to whitish grey, and the pleura is whitish to silvery gray. The wing is very narrow, usually having 10 white spots on each wing. Legs are generally yellow to whitish yellow.

This species is closely to related to Actocetor hova, and belongs to the same subgenus - Actocetor.
