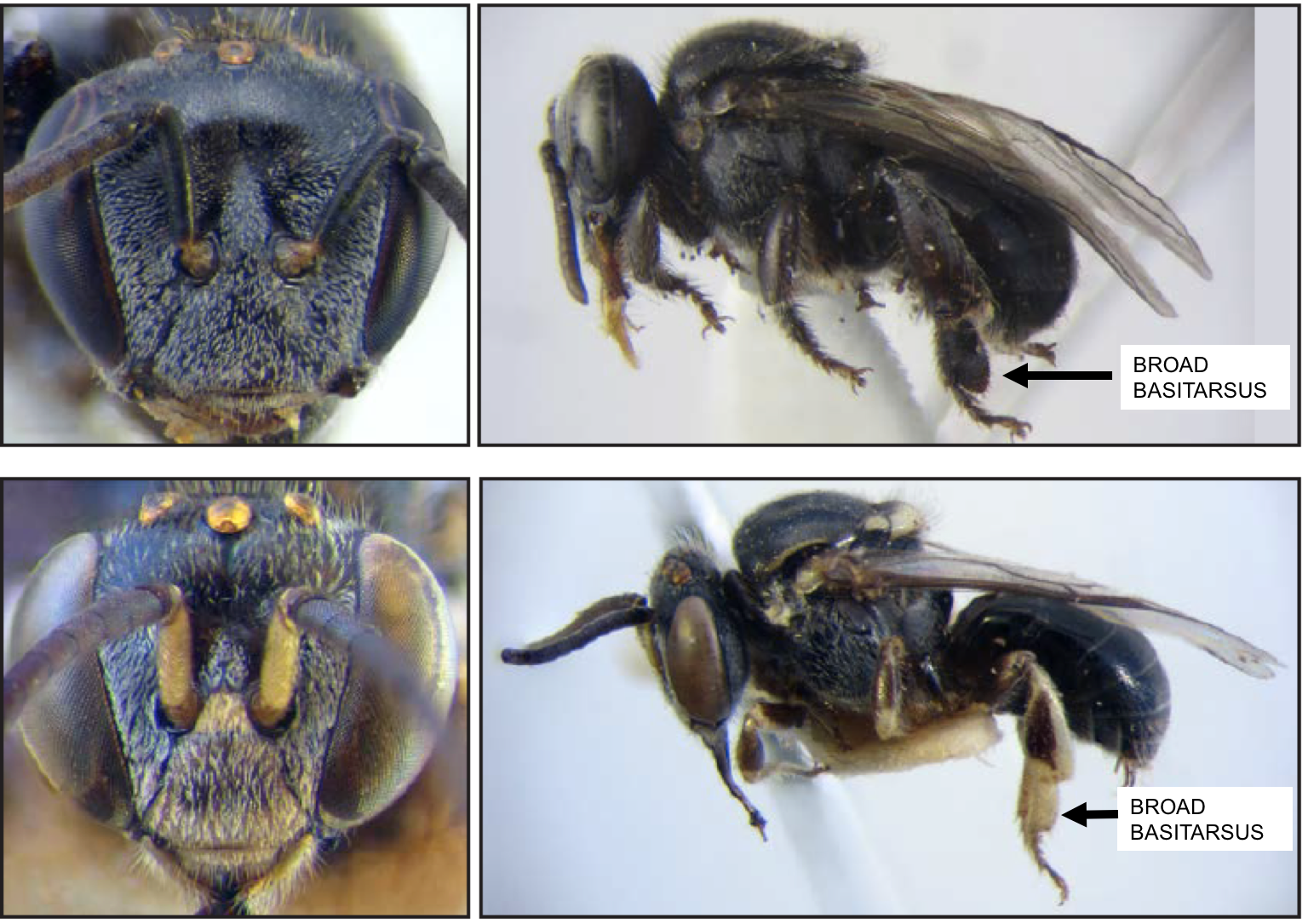
- Worker (top) and drone (bottom) of A. magna. The black arrows point at the characteristic broad basitarsus of the species.

Scientific classification
- Kingdom: Animalia
- Phylum: Arthropoda
- Clade: Pancrustacea
- Class: Insecta
- Order: Hymenoptera
- Family: Apidae
- Genus: Austroplebeia
- Species: A. magna

Binomial name
- Austroplebeia magna Dollin, Dollin and Rasmussen, 2015
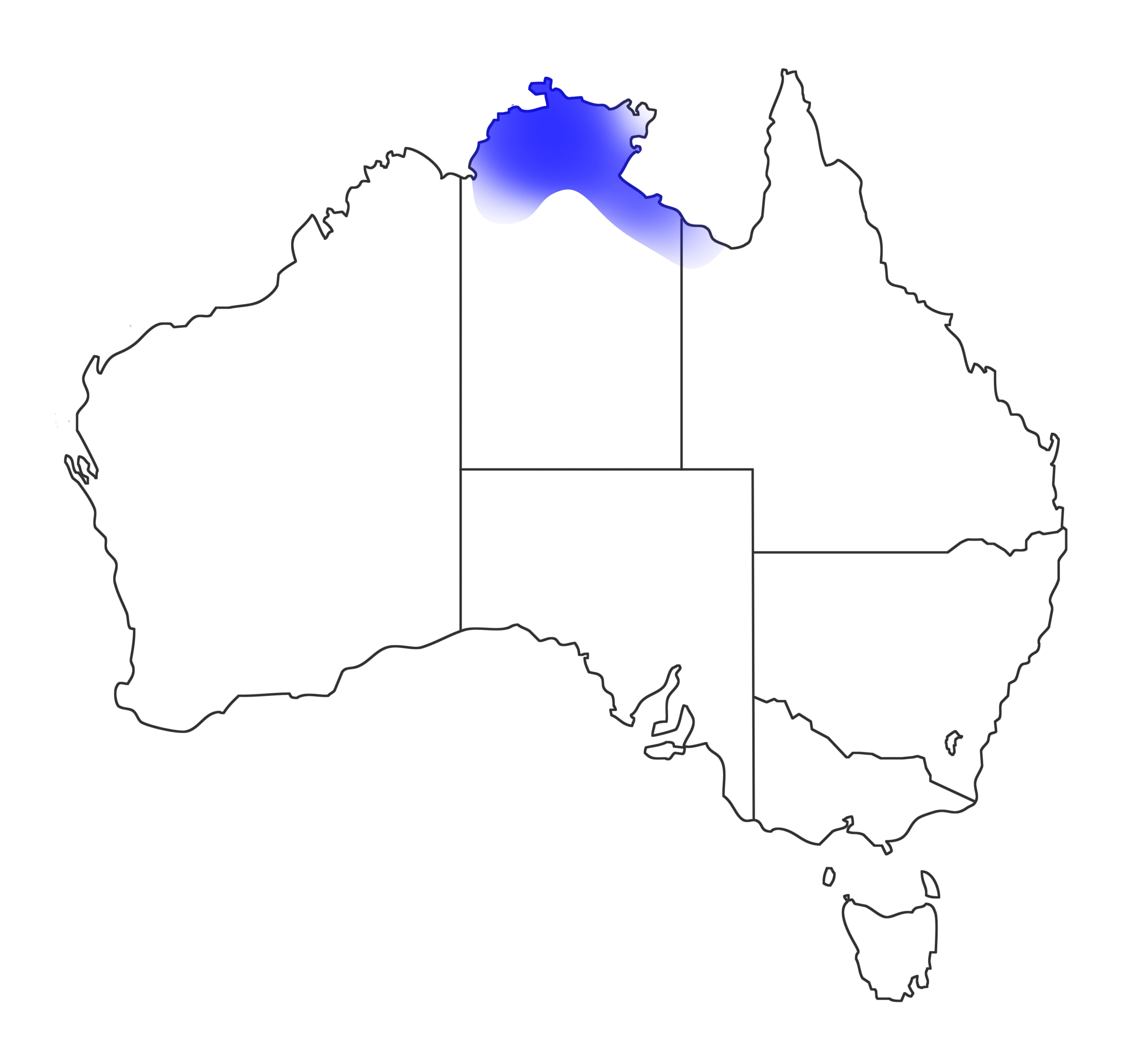
- Map showing the estimated current distribution of A. cassiae in Australia

= Austroplebeia magna =

Species of bee

Austroplebeia magna is a small eusocial stingless bee first described by Dollin, Dollin and Rasmussen in 2015, and it is found in Australia (Northern Northern Territory and far North-West Queensland).

== Etymology ==
The Latin feminine adjective, magna, meaning 'large', refers to a broad section of their legs (Basitarsus III) and long sting lancet found in workers of this species.

== Description and identification ==
A. magna is very similar to A. cassiae in size and colouration. The workers (3.5–4.5mm) are darker in colour compared to A. australis. The hind edge of their thorax usually only has two ochre or cream spots. Their face has a thick white hair with at least one full marking hidden underneath it. Sometimes workers have no marking at all on their face or thorax, like some populations found in Arnhem land in the Northern Territory. The males are brightly marked, with cream bands on their face, thorax and legs. The main differences from A. cassiae are their broad basitarsus III, long sting lancet and fine clypeus hair.

== Nest building ==
The nests of A. magna studied so far have been found in small to medium size hollow trees (10–24 cm diameter at nest level). The nests have a short entrance tunnel. The brood structure and storage pots are similar to the ones in A. australis.

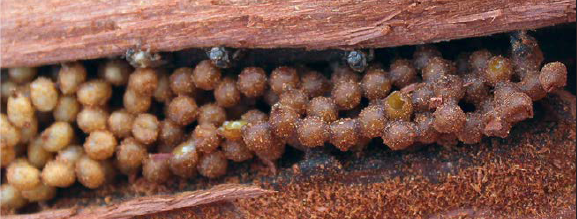
Brood structure of A. magna

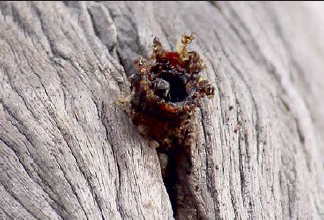
The short entrance tunnel of A. magna

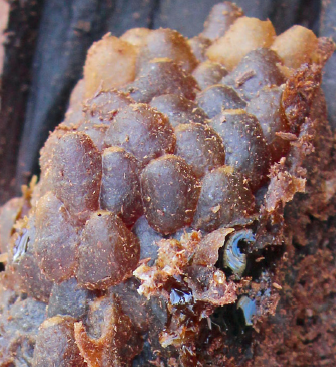
Honey pots of A. magna
