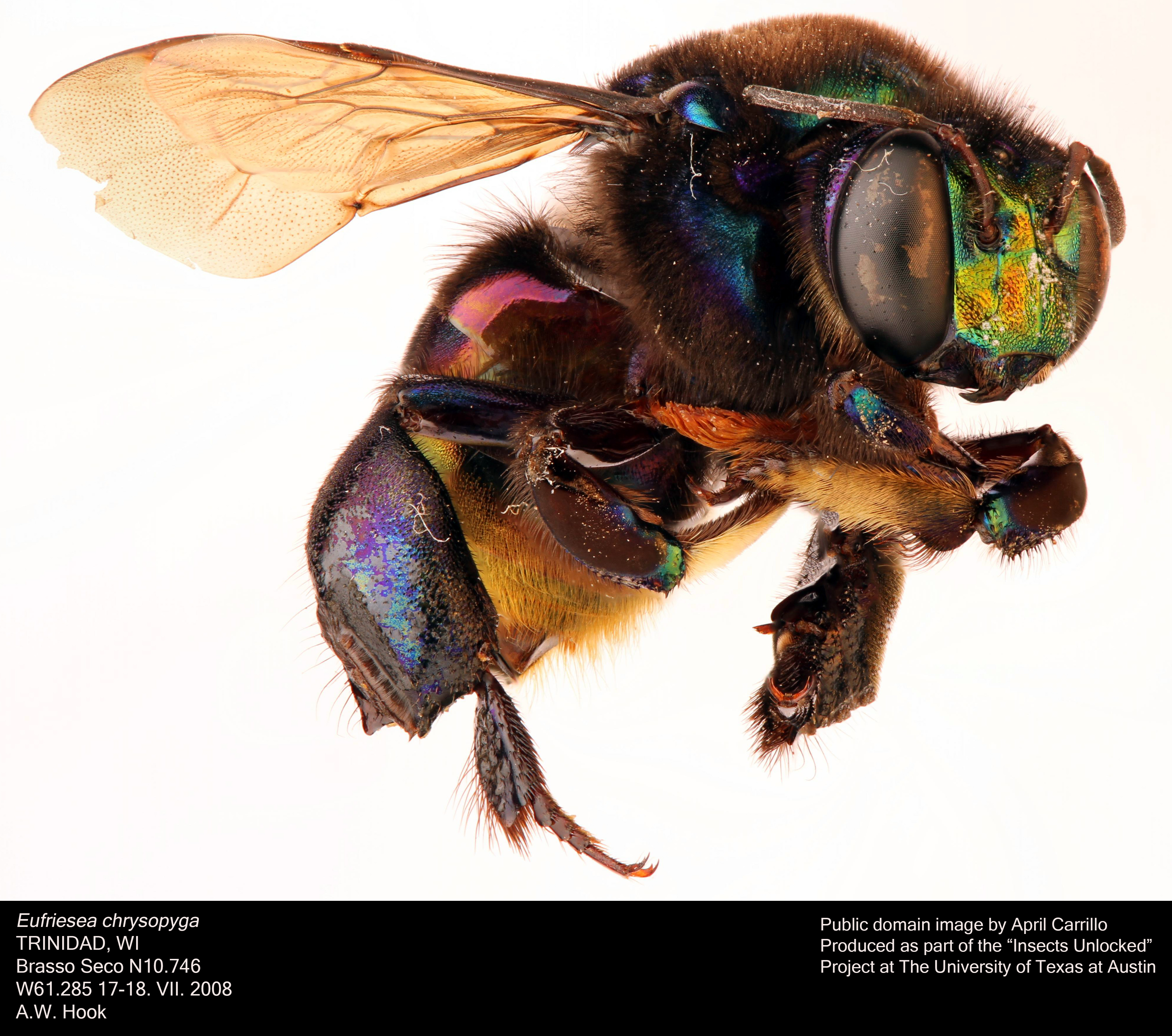
- Eufriesea chrysopyga

Scientific classification
- Kingdom: Animalia
- Phylum: Arthropoda
- Clade: Pancrustacea
- Class: Insecta
- Order: Hymenoptera
- Family: Apidae
- Tribe: Euglossini
- Genus: Eufriesea; Cockerell, 1908

Species
- see text

Diversity
- > 60 species

Synonyms
- Plusia Hoffmannsegg, 1817 (Preocc.); Eumorpha Friese, 1899 (Preocc.); Eufriesia Lutz & Cockerell, 1920 (Missp.); Euplusia Moure, 1943

= Eufriesea =

Genus of bees

Eufriesea is a genus of euglossine bees. Like all orchid bees, they are restricted to the Neotropics.

All species range from entirely to at least partially metallic (the face and/or tegulae), though much of the body in some species may be brown/black in color and hairy.

== Distribution ==
Eufriesea have been found from Texas to central Argentina.

== E. purpurata ==
At least one species in this genus, Eufriesea purpurata from Brazil, has been shown to deliberately collect large quantities of the insecticide DDT without any apparent adverse effects. Individual bees were observed to collect as much as 2 mg, which is equivalent to several percent of the bee's weight. Bees were observed to return to the walls of houses that had been recently sprayed with DDT and to collect the dried insecticide. The males of orchid bees are known to collect aromatic fragrances from certain kinds of orchids, and it is thought that they use these in territorial display and courtship, probably as precursors of their own pheromones. Some orchid bees have also been found to collect fragrances from rotten wood.

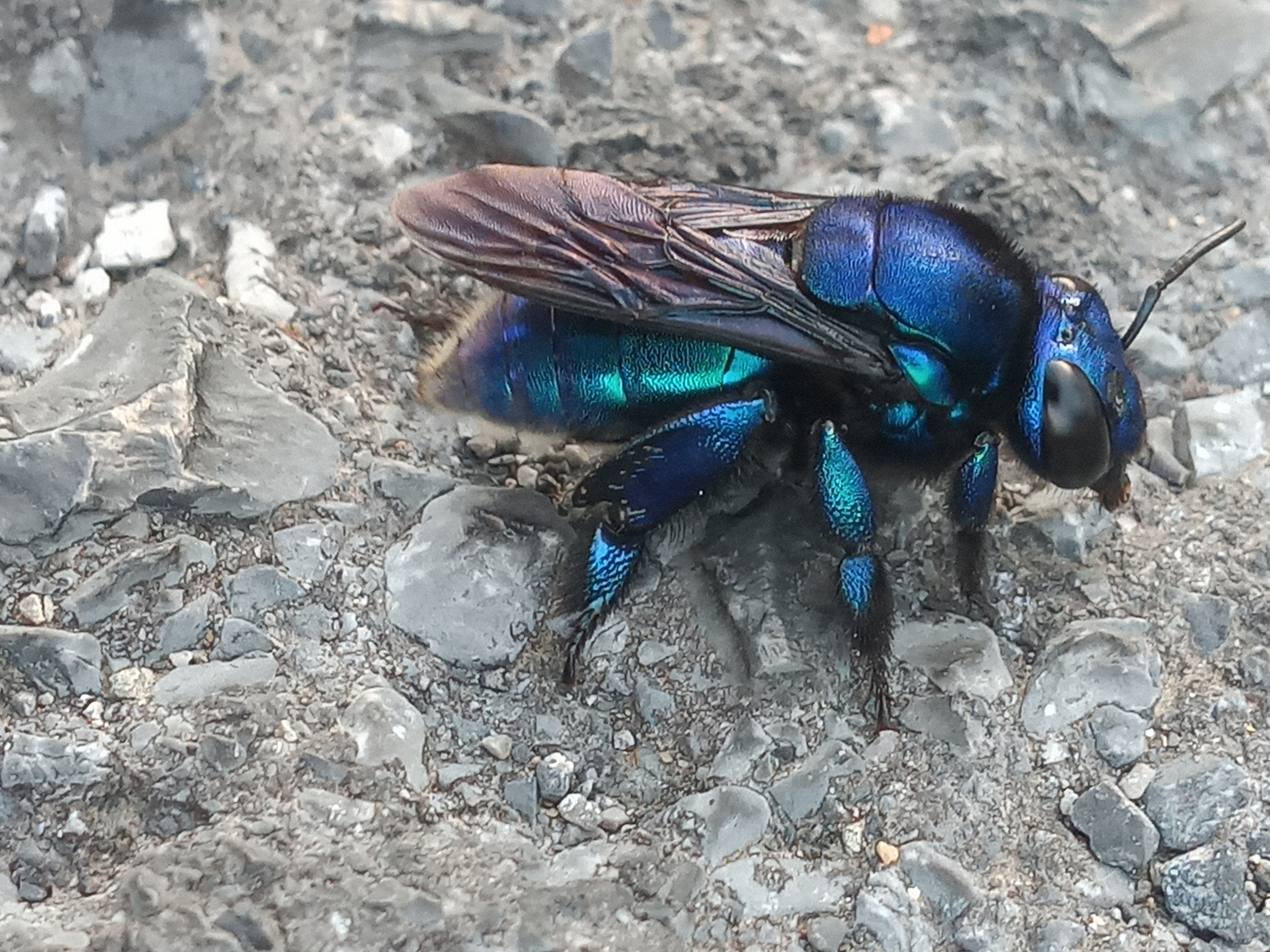
Eufriesea coerulescens, Mexico

== Name ==
The genus is named after entomologist Heinrich Friese.

== Species ==
- E. aeniventris (Mocsáry, 1896)
- E. andina (Friese, 1925)
- E. anisochlora (Kimsey, 1977)
- E. atlantica Nemésio, 2008
- E. auriceps (Friese, 1899)
- E. auripes (Gribodo, 1882)
- E. bare González & Gaiani, 1989
- E. barthelli Gonzalez & Griswold 2017
- E. boharti (Kimsey, 1977)
- E. brasilianorum (Friese, 1899)
- E. buchwaldi (Friese, 1923)
- E. caerulescens (Lepeletier, 1841)
- E. chaconi González & Gaiani, 1989
- E. chalybaea (Friese, 1923)
- E. chrysopyga (Mocsáry, 1898)
- E. combinata (Mocsáry, 1897)
- E. concava (Friese, 1899)
- E. convexa (Friese, 1899)
- E. corusca (Kimsey, 1977)
- E. dentilabris (Mocsáry, 1897)
- E. distinguenda (Gribodo, 1882)
- E. dressleri (Kimsey, 1977)
- E. duckei (Friese, 1923)
- E. eburneocincta (Kimsey, 1977)
- E. elegans (Lepeletier, 1841)
- E. engeli Gonzalez & Griswold 2017
- E. excellens (Friese, 1925)
- E. fallax (Smith, 1854)
- E. flaviventris (Friese, 1899)
- E. formosa (Mocsáry, 1908)
- E. fragrocara (Kimsey, 1977)
- E. heideri Nemésio & Bembé, 2008
- E. insularis Ayala et al., 2022
- E. kimimari González & Gaiani, 1989
- E. laniventris (Ducke, 1902)
- E. limbata (Mocsáry, 1897)
- E. lucida (Kimsey, 1977)
- E. lucifera Kimsey, 1977
- E. macroglossa (Moure, 1965)
- E. magrettii (Friese, 1899)
- E. mariana (Mocsáry, 1896)
- E. mexicana (Mocsáry, 1897)
- E. micheneri (Ayala & Engel, 2008)
- E. mussitans (Fabricius, 1787)
- E. nigrescens (Friese, 1925)
- E. nigrohirta (Friese, 1899)
- E. oliveri Gonzalez & Griswold 2017
- E. opulenta (Mocsáry, 1908)
- E. ornata (Mocsáry, 1896)
- E. pallida (Kimsey, 1977)
- E. pretiosa (Friese, 1903)
- E. pulchra (Smith, 1854)
- E. purpurata (Mocsáry, 1896)
- E. pyrrhopyga Faria & Melo 2011
- E. rufocauda (Kimsey, 1977)
- E. rugosa (Friese, 1899)
- E. schmidtiana (Friese, 1925)
- E. simillima (Moure & Michener, 1965)
- E. superba (Hoffmannsegg, 1817)
- E. surinamensis (Linnaeus, 1758)
- E. theresiae (Mocsáry, 1908)
- E. velutina (Moure, 1999)
- E. venezolana (Schrottky, 1913)
- E. venusta (Moure, 1965)
- E. vidua (Moure, 1976)
- E. violacea (Blanchard, 1840)
- E. violascens (Mocsáry, 1898)
- E. zhangi Nemésio, Júnior and Santos, 2013
