= Clanoneurum americanum =

Scientific classification
- Kingdom: Animalia
- Phylum: Arthropoda
- Class: Insecta
- Order: Diptera
- Family: Ephydridae
- Subfamily: Discomyzinae
- Tribe: Psilopini
- Genus: Clanoneurum
- Species: C. americanum

Binomial name
- Clanoneurum americanum Cresson, 1940

Species of fly

Clanoneurum americanum is a species of shore flies in the family Ephydridae.

== Distribution ==
United States,
