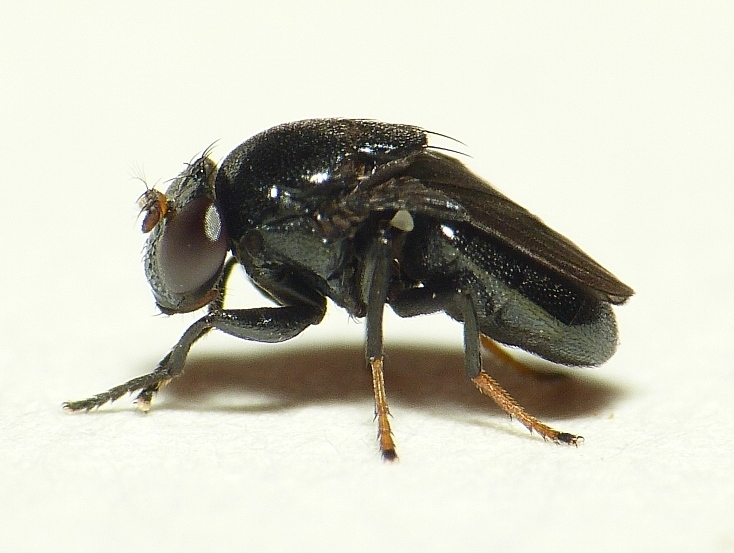
- Discomyza incurva Netherlands

Scientific classification
- Kingdom: Animalia
- Phylum: Arthropoda
- Class: Insecta
- Order: Diptera
- Family: Ephydridae
- Subfamily: Discomyzinae
- Tribe: Discomyzini
- Genus: Discomyza
- Species: D. incurva

Binomial name
- Discomyza incurva (Fallen, 1823)

Synonyms
- Psilopa incurva Fallen, 1823

= Discomyza incurva =

Species of fly

Discomyza incurva is a species of fly in the family Ephydridae. It is found in the Palearctic. It is 2.5–3 mm.long. Found July-September. The habitat is grasslands. All Europe especially South Europe. Also North Africa. D. incurva is a parasite of Helix spp. land snails.

== Distribution ==
Canada, Senegal, Albania, Algeria, Austria, Bulgaria, Cyprus, Czech Republic, Great Britain, Switzerland, Germany.
