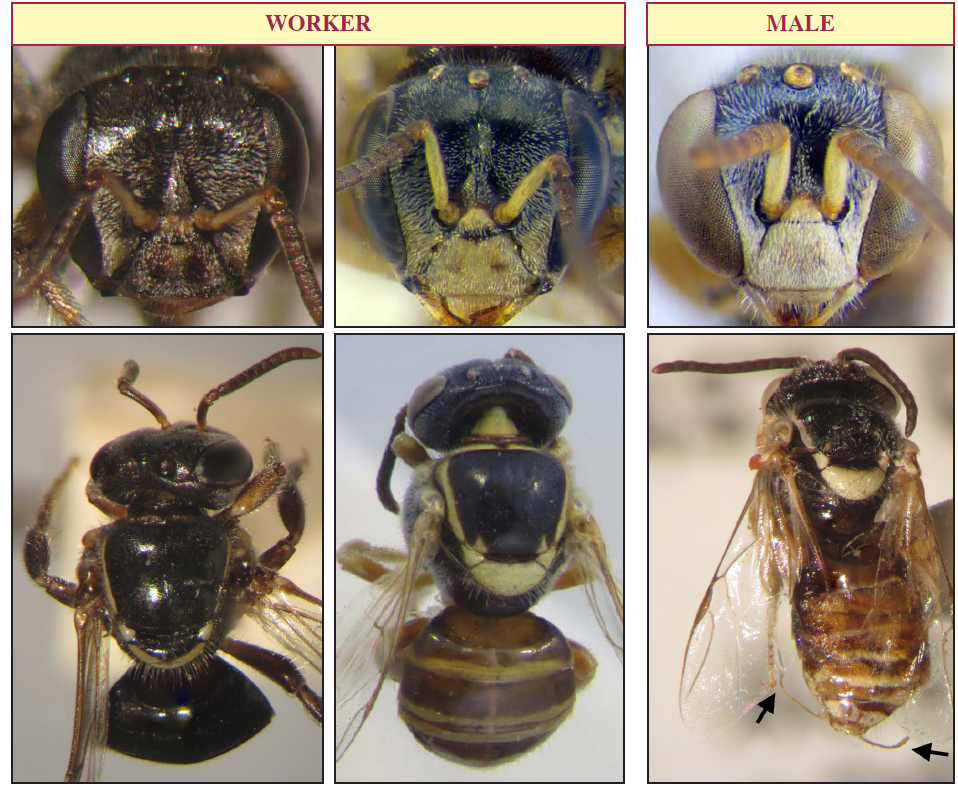
- Two different morphs of workers (first two columns) and drone (third column) of A. essingtoni. The black arrows point at the characteristic genitalia with bent tips of the drones.

Scientific classification
- Kingdom: Animalia
- Phylum: Arthropoda
- Class: Insecta
- Order: Hymenoptera
- Family: Apidae
- Tribe: Meliponini
- Genus: Austroplebeia
- Species: A. essingtoni

Binomial name
- Austroplebeia essingtoni Cockerell, 1905
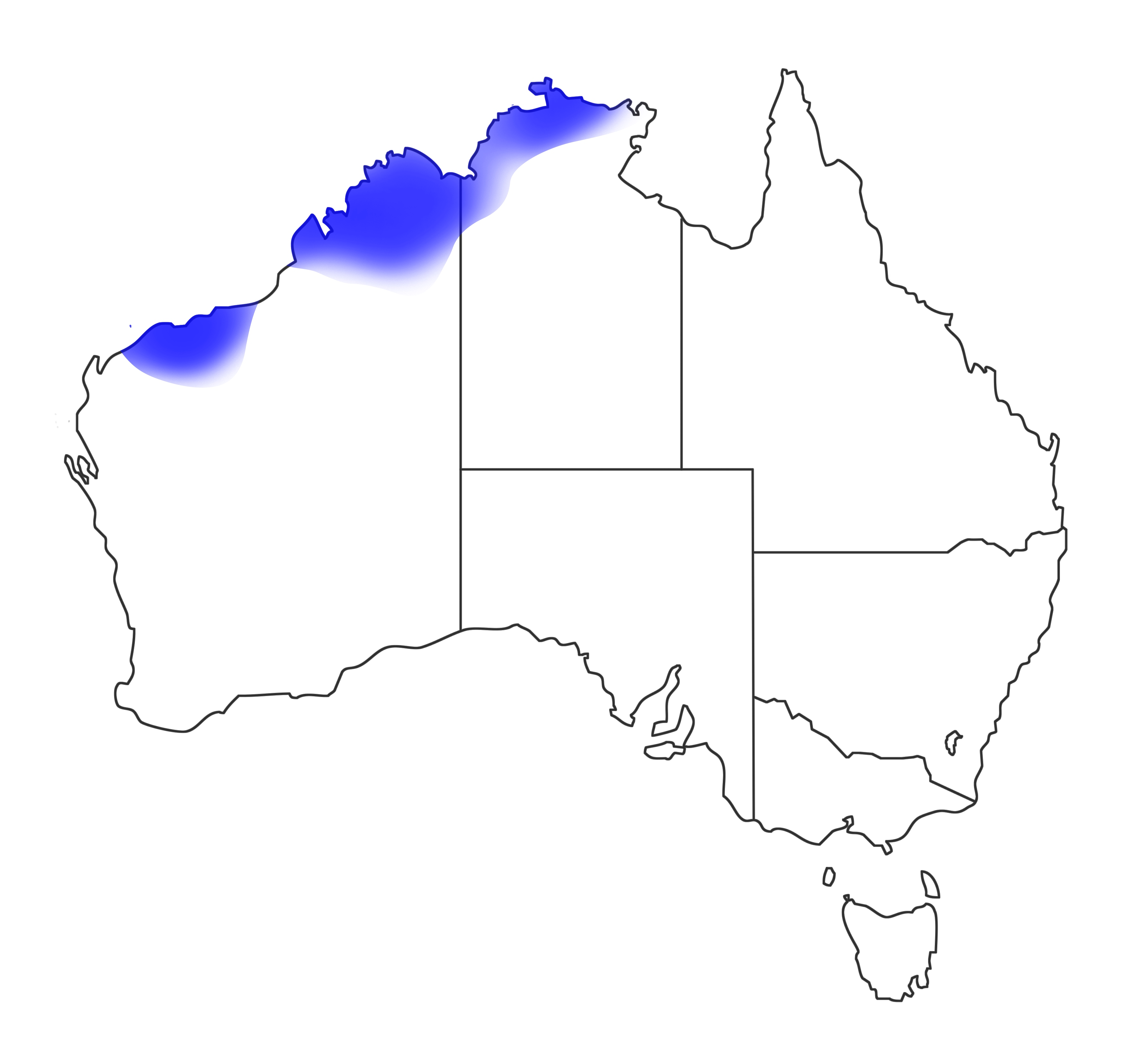
- Map showing the estimated current distribution of A. essingtoni in Australia

Synonyms
- Trigona essingtoni Cockerell, 1905; Austroplebeia essingtoni Moure, 1961; T. (Plebeia) essingtoni Michener, 1965

= Austroplebeia essingtoni =

Species of insect

Austroplebeia essingtoni is a small eusocial stingless bee first described by Cockerell in 1905 and it is found in Australia (Northern areas of Western Australia and Northern Territory). They are one of the smallest stingless bees in Australia and can survive in very arid areas with annual rainfalls down to 300 mm.

== Etymology ==
The name 'essingtoni' was given because the first specimens were collected from Port Essington on the north coast of Arnhem Land, Australia in 1840.

== Description and identification ==
The workers (3.2-3.9mm) usually have distinct cream bands on the side and rear of the thorax and broad cream marking on the lower face. Most workers are noticeably smaller than those of the other Austroplebeia species across their distribution. Their colouring varies, workers in the Hamersley Ranges are brighter, with pale yellow bands on the thorax, legs and abdomen as well as bright patterns on the lower face. Other populations in contrast, such as the ones in coastal areas, are much darker. Males from this species are brightly coloured and have unusual bent tips on their genitalia.

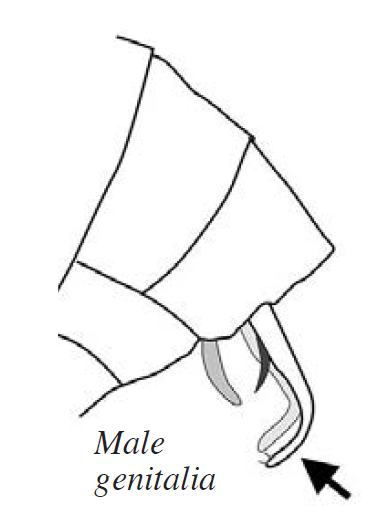
The characteristic male genitalia with bent tips of A. essingtoni

== Nest building ==
A. essingtoni usually nests in small to medium hollow trees (9–30 cm diameter at nest level) but many nest in wall cavities or crevices in cliffs. Similar to A. cassiae and A. magna, A. essingtoni builds a short nest entrance tunnel. The cells in the broods are loosely connected together into an irregular structure called a "cluster". The pollen and honey is stored in spherical or oval shaped pots with thin walls.

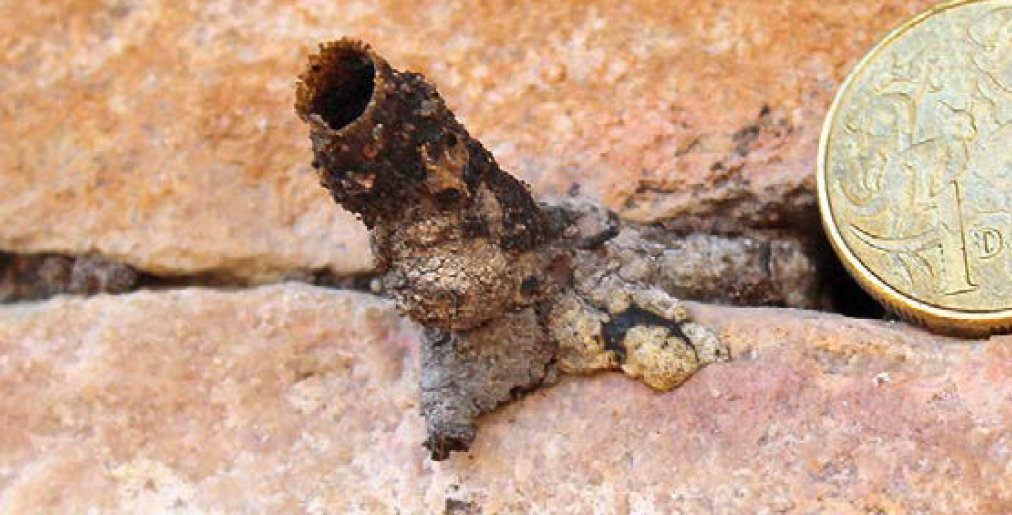
The short entrance tunnel of A. essingtoni

== Human use ==
Preliminary attempts to establish this species in hives have been successful but propagation by division has not achieved much success.
