= Megachile rhinoceros =

Scientific classification
- Domain: Eukaryota
- Kingdom: Animalia
- Phylum: Arthropoda
- Class: Insecta
- Order: Hymenoptera
- Family: Megachilidae
- Genus: Megachile
- Species: M. rhinoceros

Binomial name
- Megachile rhinoceros (Mocsáry, 1892)

Species of bee

Megachile rhinoceros is a species of bee belonging to the mason bee family. M. rhinoceros was described by Alexander Mocsáry in 1892.
