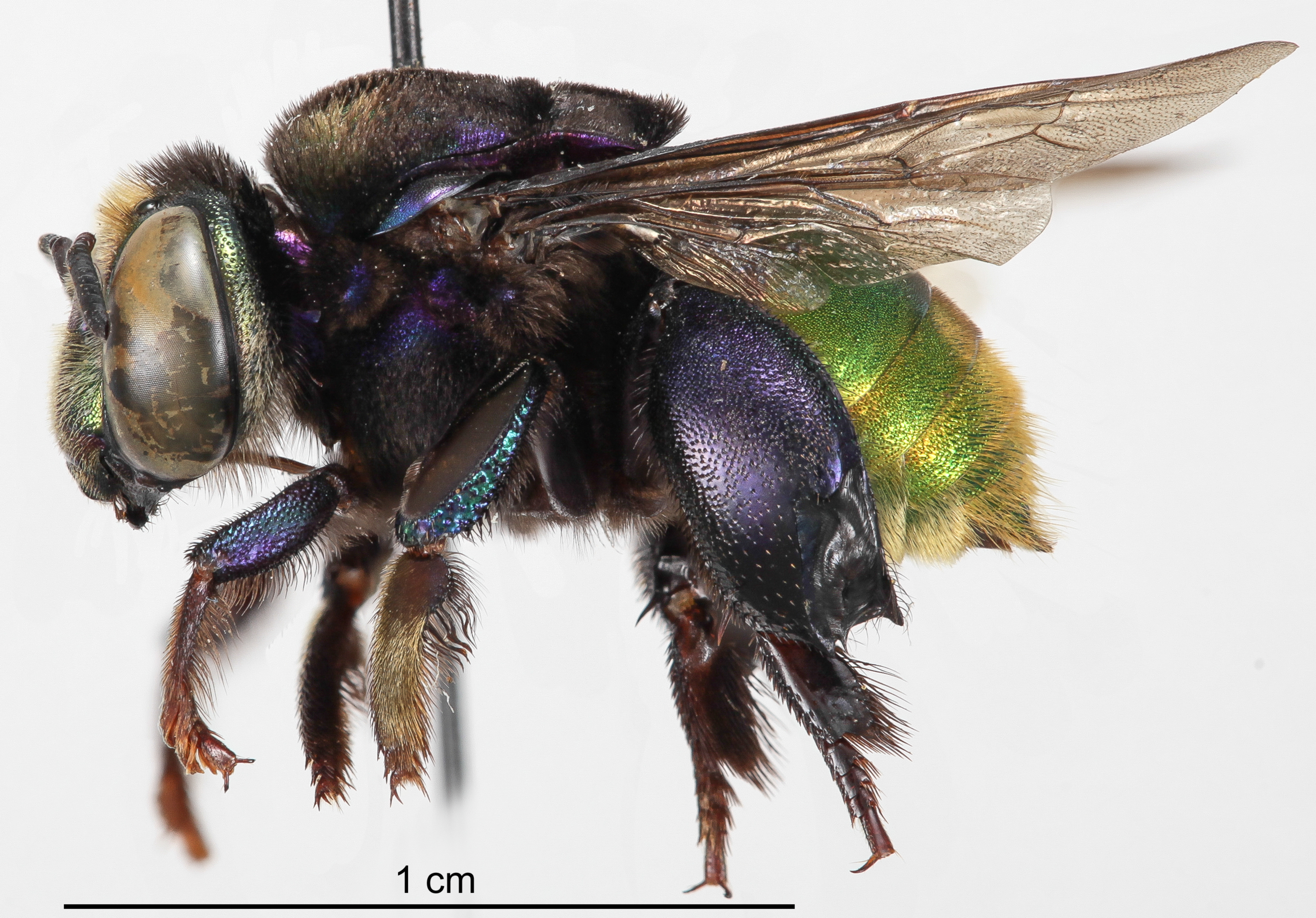
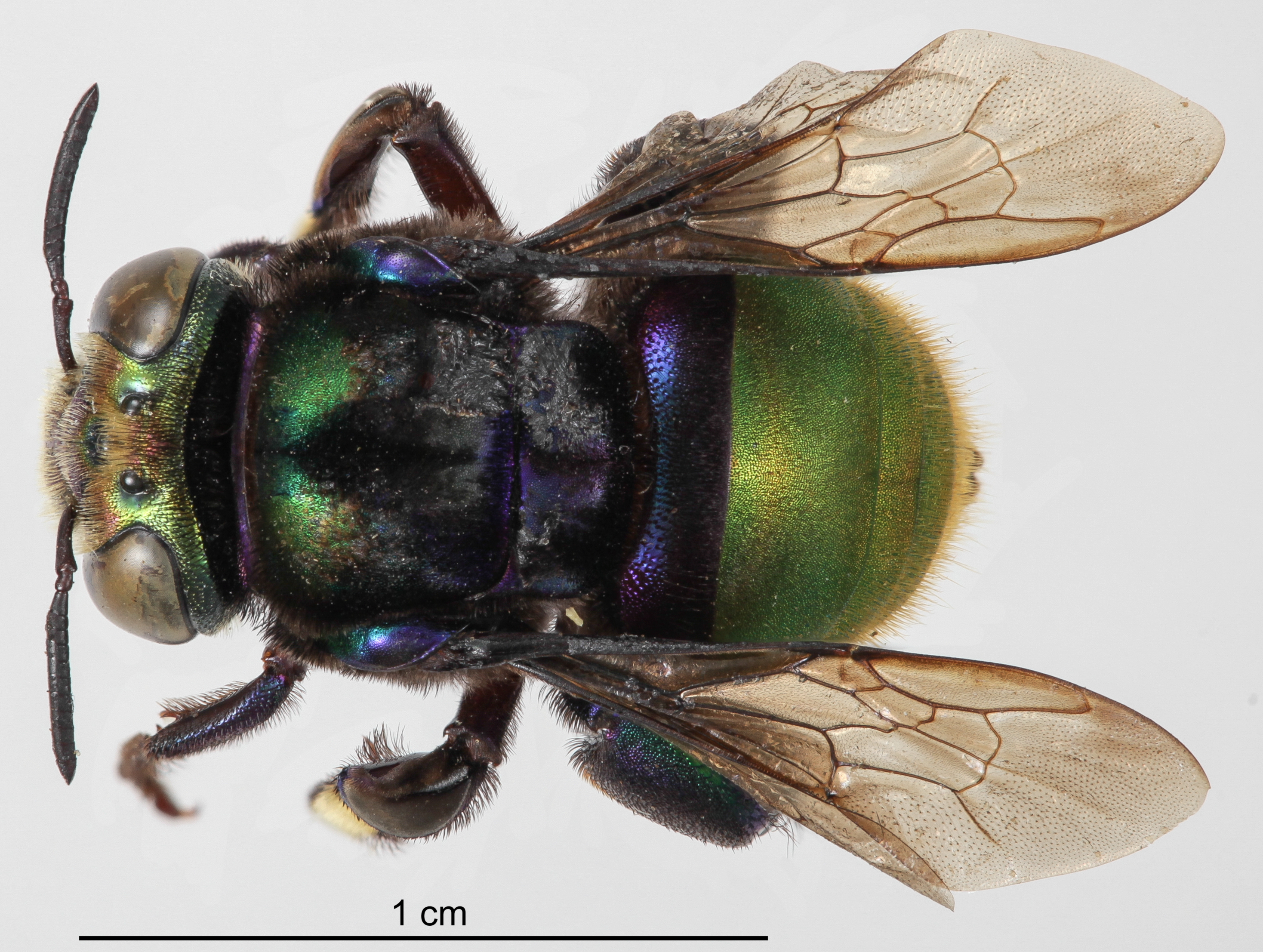
- Lateral and dorsal views of E. purpurata

Scientific classification
- Kingdom: Animalia
- Phylum: Arthropoda
- Class: Insecta
- Order: Hymenoptera
- Family: Apidae
- Genus: Eufriesea
- Species: E. purpurata

Binomial name
- Eufriesea purpurata Mocsáry, 1896

Synonyms
- Euglossa purpurata (Mocsáry, 1896); Euplusia purpurata (Mocsáry, 1896)

= Eufriesea purpurata =

Species of orchid bee that collects DDT

Eufriesea purpurata is a species of eusocial orchid bee common in northeastern South America, particularly in the Amazon basin. It is an important pollinator of various wild plants, and it is noted for its attraction to various synthetic compounds used by humans, including some insecticides. In the late 1970s, males of the species pestered an indigenous Amazonian community whose palm-leaf houses had been sprayed by the government with DDT, which the bees found attractive.

== Morphology ==
Eufriesea purpurata has a bright green metallic-colored head with red-orange highlights, a short tongue (5–6 mm), an adult body length of 14–17 mm, and an average body weight of 50 mg. Its thorax is most often purple, but can also be reddish, yellow, or green.

== Natural ecology ==
Like other euglossine bees, E. purpurata males collect volatile floral scents, possibly for courtship purposes. Adolf Ducke described Eufriesea purpurata collecting Melastomataceae bark and resin as nest-building materials. Eufriesea purpurata is considered a pest to Anthurium cultivation because of its indiscriminate cross-pollination of flowers. It is the sole pollinator of the Stanhopea insignis species of orchid, which attracts the bees with its fragrance. It is also a pollinator of the orchids Cycnoches aureum, Dressleria helleri, and Gongora spp., as well as the monocots Spathiphyllum cannaefolium and Coryanthes spp. and the eudicot Mouriri nervosa. It has been observed rarely visiting the flowers of the Brazil nut tree, but is considered unlikely to be an important pollinator of the plant.

== Attraction to insecticides ==
The bee is attracted to and unharmed by the insecticide DDT. In 1979 and 1980, males of the species were observed deliberately collecting large quantities of the insecticide from remote, rural houses along Brazil's Ituxi River. The houses, which were constructed from palm leaves, had been treated with DDT in the summer of 1979 by the government to prevent the spread of malaria. Attracted by the smell of the insecticide, the bees were observed finding and returning often to the DDT-sprayed houses, entering the homes to scrape dried insecticide from the walls into their hind tibial pouches. Individual bees of the species were observed collecting as much as 2 mg of DDT each (4% of their average body weight) with no apparent adverse effects, displaying a tolerance tens or hundreds of times greater than most insects. The bees do not ingest or otherwise metabolize the collected DDT, which Whitten suggests "must mimic some natural product sought by the bee". Interviews with locals revealed that there had been no house-visiting bees until the malaria control spray program had begun. Of families interviewed, 95% reported some disturbance from the bees' noise, and 71% of interviewees had bees in their homes during their interviews.

Eufriesea purpurata has also been observed collecting the insecticide aldrin. One scientific account from Peru describes hundreds of male bees drawn to aldrin-treated wood walls, which were "actually scarred by [the bees'] repeated scratching". E. purpurata has also been found to be attracted to benzyl alcohol, a major component of Stanhopea insignis' fragrance, and anisyl acetate.

== See also ==
- Helaeomyia petrolei, a fly that develops in crude oil
