= Clanoneurum =

Scientific classification
- Kingdom: Animalia
- Phylum: Arthropoda
- Class: Insecta
- Order: Diptera
- Family: Ephydridae
- Subfamily: Discomyzinae
- Tribe: Psilopini
- Genus: Clanoneurum; Becker, 1903

Genus of flies

Clanoneurum is a genus of shore flies in the family Ephydridae.

== Species ==
- C. americanum Cresson, 1940
- C. cimiciforme (Haliday, 1855)
- C. menozzii Séguy, 1929
- C. orientale Hendel, 1913
