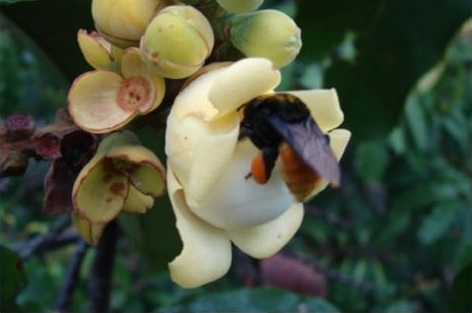
- Eufriesea flaviventris female visiting flowers of the Brazil nut (Bertholletia excelsa).

Scientific classification
- Domain: Eukaryota
- Kingdom: Animalia
- Phylum: Arthropoda
- Class: Insecta
- Order: Hymenoptera
- Family: Apidae
- Genus: Eufriesea
- Species: E. flaviventris

Binomial name
- Eufriesea flaviventris Moure, 1964

= Eufriesea flaviventris =

Species of bee

Eufriesea flaviventris is a species of bee in the family Apidae, tribe Euglossini (orchid bees).
