= Leptopsilopa =

Scientific classification
- Kingdom: Animalia
- Phylum: Arthropoda
- Class: Insecta
- Order: Diptera
- Family: Ephydridae
- Subfamily: Discomyzinae
- Tribe: Psilopini
- Genus: Leptopsilopa; Cresson, 1922

Type species
- Psilopa similis Coquillett, 1900

Genus of flies

Leptopsilopa is a genus of shore flies in the family Ephydridae.

== Species ==
- L. africana Cresson, 1946
- L. andiana Mathis, 2006
- L. atrimana (Loew, 1878)
- L. aurata (Canzoneri & Meneghini, 1969)
- L. demartini Canzoneri, 1987
- L. flavicoxa Mathis, 2006
- L. leonensis Canzoneri & Rampini, 1990
- L. lineanota Cresson, 1922
- L. martharum Mathis, 2006
- L. metallina (Becker, 1919)
- L. mianii Canzoneri & Raffone, 1987
- L. mutabilis Cresson, 1925
- L. nigricoxa Cresson, 1922
- L. nigrimanus (Williston, 1896)
- L. placentia Mathis, 2006
- L. pollinosa (Kertész, 1901)
- L. rossii Canzoneri & Raffone, 1987
- L. similis (Coquillett, 1900)
- L. subapicalis Cresson, 1922
- L. tibialis (Canzoneri & Meneghini, 1969)
- L. varipes (Coquillett, 1900)
