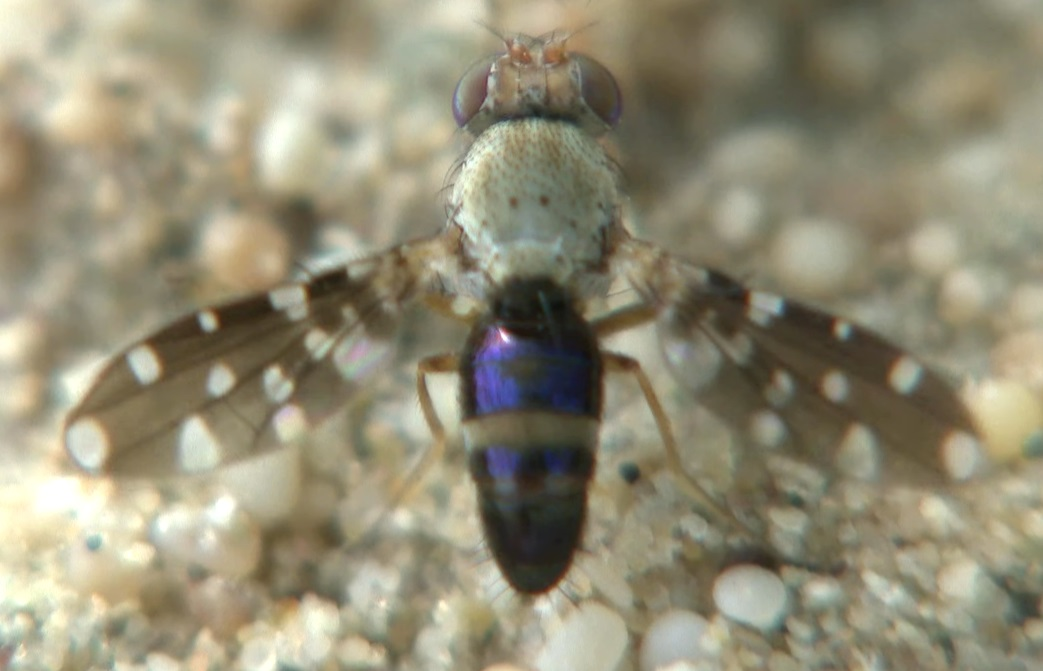
- Actocetor indicus

Scientific classification
- Kingdom: Animalia
- Phylum: Arthropoda
- Class: Insecta
- Order: Diptera
- Family: Ephydridae
- Subfamily: Discomyzinae
- Tribe: Discomyzini
- Genus: Actocetor; Becker, 1903

Type species
- Ephydra margaritata

= Actocetor =

Genus of flies

Actocetor is a genus of shore flies in the family Ephydridae. It was described by Theodor Becker in 1903.

== Species ==
There are seven recognized species in the genus

- Actocetor (Poecilostenia):
  - Actocetor decemguttatus (Bezzi, 1908) - Botswana, Namibia, South Africa, Ethiopia, Kenya, Nigeria, Senegal
  - Actocetor lindneri (Wirth, 1955) - Kenya, Tanzania
  - Actocetor yaromi (Dikow and Mathis, 2002) - Ethiopia
- Actocetor (Actocetor):
  - Actocetor afrus (Dikow and Mathis, 2002) - Liberia and Senegal
  - Actocetor hova (Soika, 1956) - Madagascar
  - Actocetor indicus (Wiedemann, 1824) - India, Sri Lanka, Malaysia, Spain, United Arab Emirates, Oman, Israel, Egypt, Sudan, Eritrea, Ethiopia, Kenya, Uganda, Tanzania, Democratic Republic of the Congo, Malawi, Zimbabwe, South Africa, Angola, Namibia, Cameroon, Nigeria, Ivory Coast, Senegal, Sierra Leone, Canary Islands, Seychelles and Cape Verde
  - Actocetor nigrifinis (Walker, 1860) - India, Malaysia, Indonesia, Philippines, Sri Lanka and Thailand

Note: In Dikow & Mathis (2002) the senior objective homonym Actocetor beckeri de Meijere, 1916 is then (p.261) treated as a junior subjective synonym of Actocetor nigrifinis (Walker, 1860). In contrast, the junior objective homonym Actocetor beckeri Hendel, 1917 [replaced by Actocetor hendeli de Meijere, 1924: 202] is then (p.272) treated as a junior subjective synonym of Actocetor indicus (Wiedemann, 1824).
