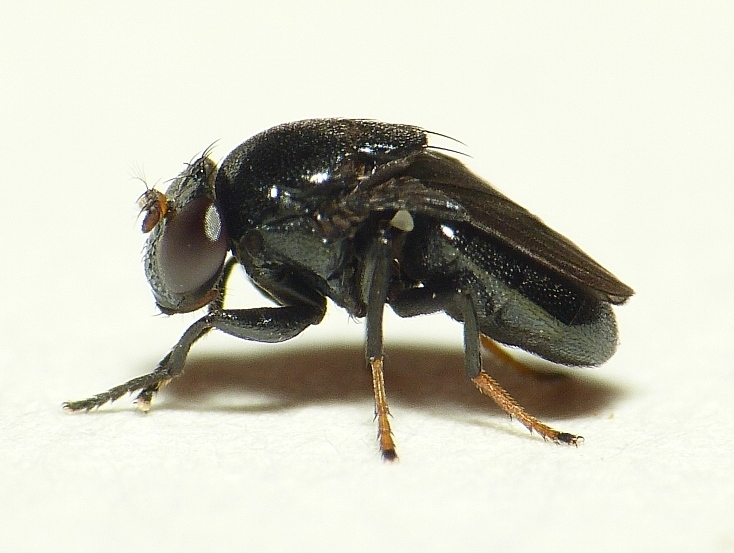
- Discomyza incurva

Scientific classification
- Kingdom: Animalia
- Phylum: Arthropoda
- Class: Insecta
- Order: Diptera
- Family: Ephydridae
- Subfamily: Discomyzinae
- Tribe: Discomyzini
- Genus: Discomyza; Meigen, 1830

Type species
- Psilopa incurva Fallen, 1823

= Discomyza =

Genus of flies

Discomyza is a genus of shore flies in the family Ephydridae.

== Species ==
- D. africana Cresson, 1939
- D. baechlii Zatwarnicki & Mathis, 2007
- D. dolichocerus Cresson, 1944
- D. eritrea Cresson, 1939
- D. fagomoga Zatwarnicki & Cielniak, 2015
- D. incurva (Fallen, 1823)
- D. maculipennis (Wiedemann, 1924)
- D. maritima Krivosheina, 1987
- D. similis Lamb, 1912
