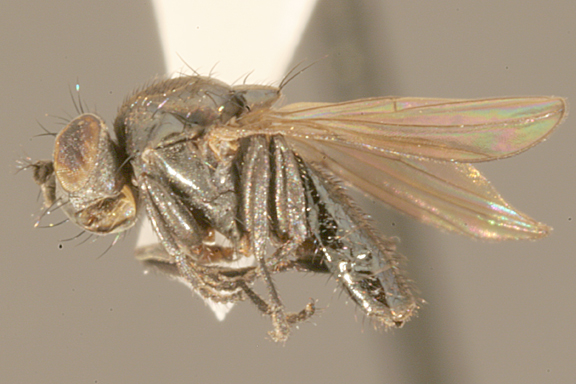

Scientific classification
- Kingdom: Animalia
- Phylum: Arthropoda
- Clade: Pancrustacea
- Class: Insecta
- Order: Diptera
- Family: Ephydridae
- Subfamily: Discomyzinae
- Tribe: Psilopini
- Genus: Helaeomyia
- Species: H. petrolei

Binomial name
- Helaeomyia petrolei (Coquillett, 1899)

Synonyms
- Psilopa petrolei Coquillett, 1899

= Helaeomyia petrolei =

Species of fly

The petroleum fly, Helaeomyia petrolei (synonym Diasemocera petrolei), is a species of fly from California, USA. The larvae feed on dead insects and other arthropods that become trapped in naturally occurring petroleum pools, making this the only known insect species that develops in crude oil, a substance which is normally highly toxic to insects.

== Description ==
Adults are about 5 mm long, with black bodies, except for lighter cheeks. The halteres are yellowish, with white knobs. The densely hairy eyes are nearest at the middle of the face. The third joint of the antennae is slightly longer than the second, the spine of the latter not reaching beyond the apex of the antennae. The hyaline wings are tinged with gray on nearly the entire costal half, except sometimes having a spot toward the apex of the submarginal cell. The apex of the second vein is nearly twice as far from the first as from the apex of the third vein.

== Biology ==
While the larvae normally swim slowly near the surface of the oil with the tips of their air-tubes showing as minute points above the surface film, they are able to submerge for longer periods. The mating behavior and egg deposition are still unknown, but it is thought that the eggs are not laid inside the oil. The larvae leave it only to pupate, travelling to nearby grass stems on the margins of the pool. Their whole development between newly hatched larva and pupa takes place exclusively in petroleum.

=== Petroleum tolerance ===
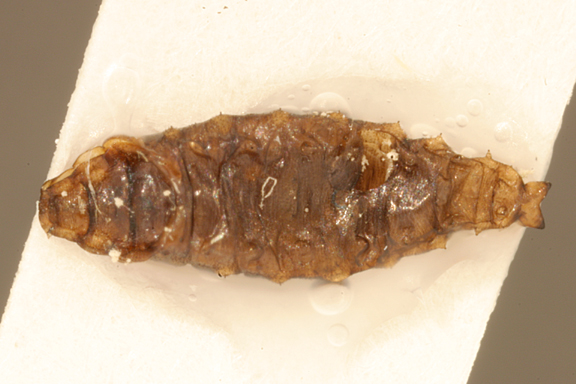
Pupa

The larvae ingest large quantities of oil and asphalt, and their guts can be seen to be filled with petroleum. However, nutritional experiments showed that they subsist on animal matter present in the oil, which they quickly devour. Although the oil can reach temperatures of up to 38 °C (100 °F), the larvae suffer no ill effects from it, even when additionally exposed to 50% turpentine or 50% xylene in laboratory experiments. Oil fly larvae contain about 200,000 heterotrophic bacteria, which have been of interest to scientists searching for microorganisms or enzymes that function in an organic solvent environment. The nitrogen-rich nutrients released into the gut make the environment, with a pH of around 6.5, suitable for the development of these bacteria. There is no evidence that these bacteria contribute to insect physiology.

William Homan Thorpe referred to H. petrolei as "undoubtedly one of the chief biological curiosities of the world."

== Distribution ==
The petroleum fly was first described in crude petroleum of the La Brea Tar Pits near Los Angeles, California, although the maggots were known to petroleum technologists many years earlier. The population is not considered endangered. The species has since been found in other locations, where the populations are considered sporadic.

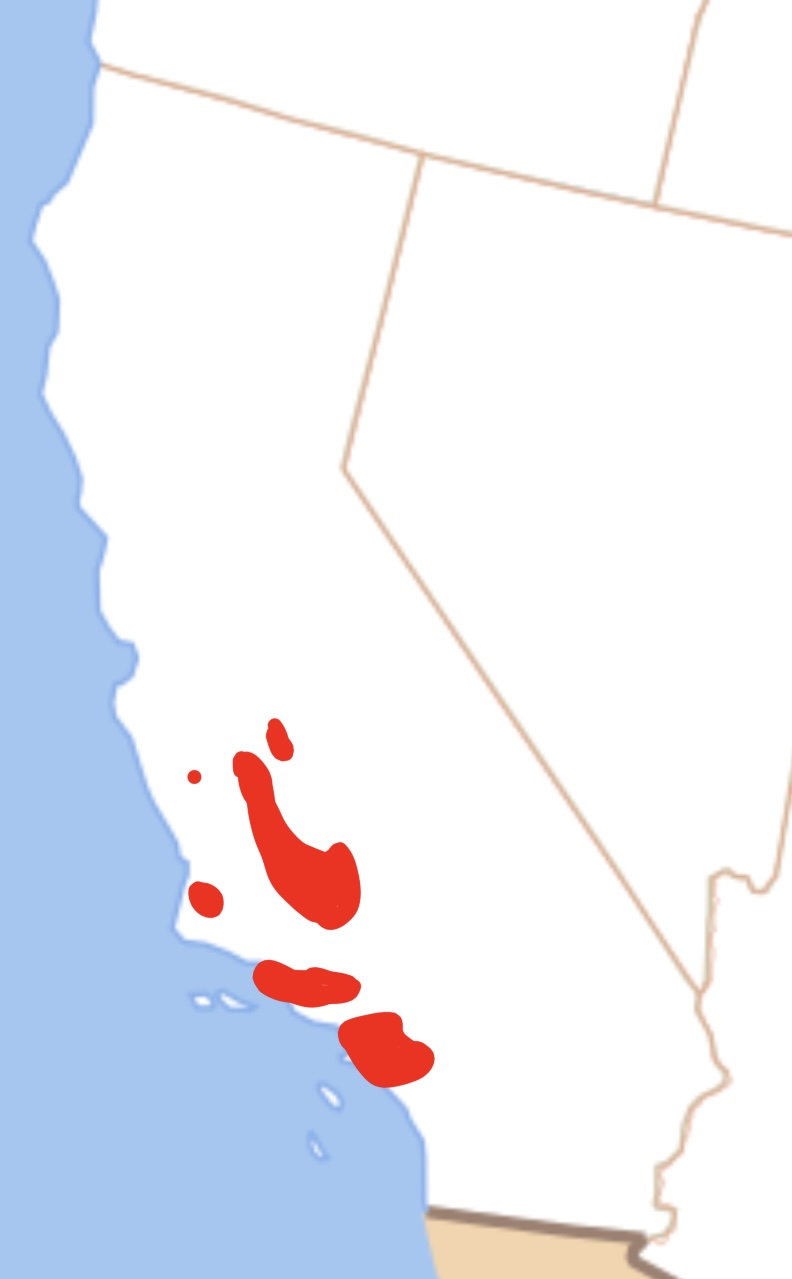
Habitat map

== See also ==
- Eufriesea purpurata, a bee that collects DDT
