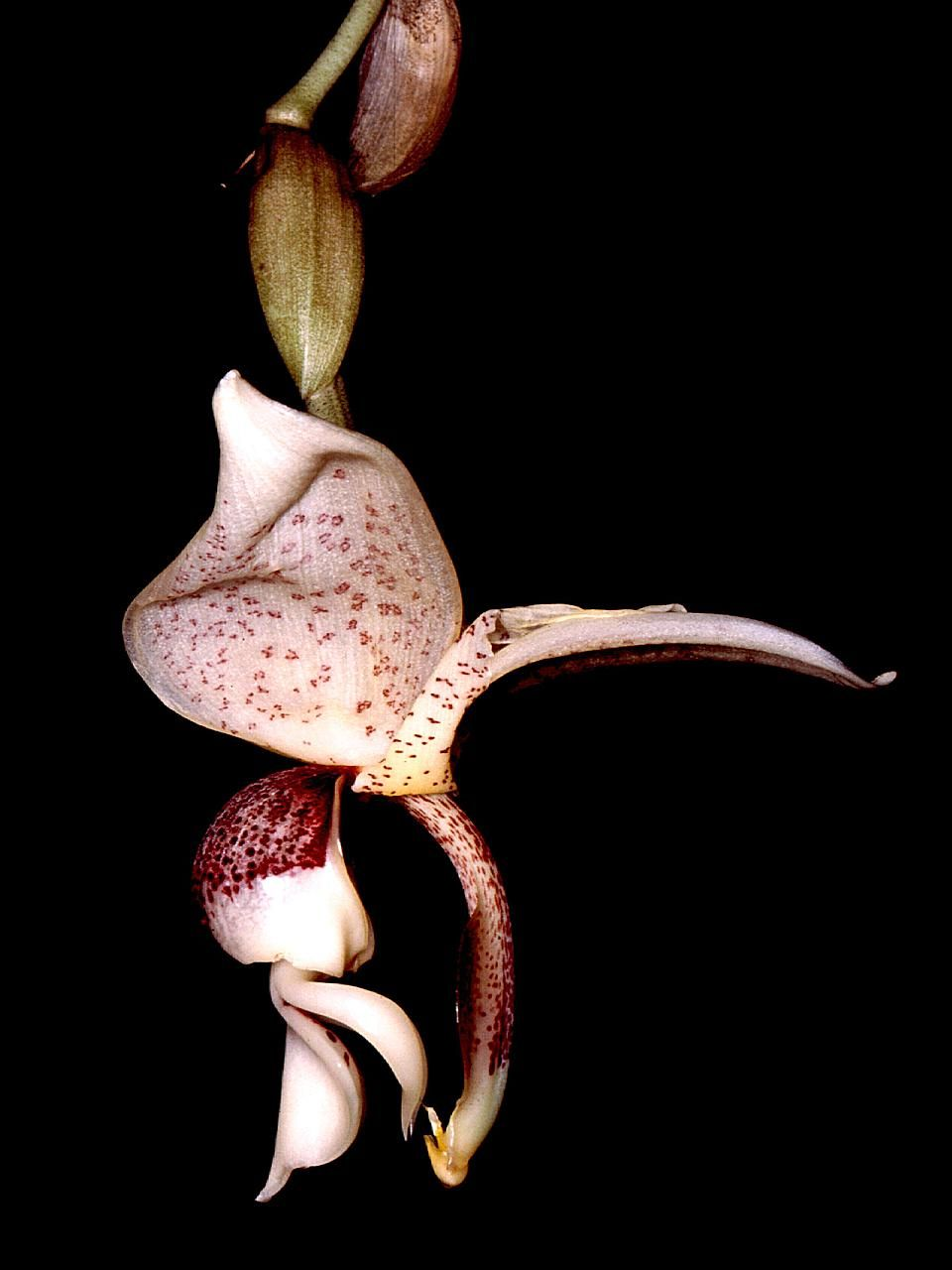
- Stanhopea insignis flower

Scientific classification
- Kingdom: Plantae
- Clade: Tracheophytes
- Clade: Angiosperms
- Clade: Monocots
- Order: Asparagales
- Family: Orchidaceae
- Subfamily: Epidendroideae
- Genus: Stanhopea
- Species: S. insignis

Binomial name
- Stanhopea insignis J.Frost ex Hook.

Synonyms
- Ceratochilus insignis (J.Frost) Lindl. ex G.Don; Stanhopea flava Lodd. ex Beer; Stanhopea odoratissima Planch.; Stanhopea atropurpurea Lodd. ex Planch.

= Stanhopea insignis =

Species of orchid

Stanhopea insignis is a species of orchid endemic to southern and southeastern Brazil. It is the type species of the genus Stanhopea. The orchid bee Eufriesea purpurata is the sole pollinator of Stanhopea insignis, which attracts the bees with its fragrance.
