= Psilopa leucostoma =

Scientific classification
- Kingdom: Animalia
- Phylum: Arthropoda
- Class: Insecta
- Order: Diptera
- Family: Ephydridae
- Tribe: Psilopini
- Genus: Psilopa
- Species: P. leucostoma

Binomial name
- Psilopa leucostoma (Meigen, 1830)

Synonyms
- Notiphila leucostoma Meigen, 1830

Species of fly

Psilopa leucostoma is a species of shore flies (insects in the family Ephydridae).

== Distribution ==
Austria, Belgium, Finland, France, Great Britain, Italy, Poland.
