= Trimerina =

Scientific classification
- Kingdom: Animalia
- Phylum: Arthropoda
- Class: Insecta
- Order: Diptera
- Family: Ephydridae
- Subfamily: Discomyzinae
- Tribe: Psilopini
- Genus: Trimerina; Macquart, 1835

Type species
- Psilopa madizans Fallen, 1813

Genus of flies

Trimerina is a genus of shore flies, insects in the family Ephydridae.

== Species ==
- T. albitarsis Canzoneri & Rampini, 1998
- T. bettellai Canzoneri, 1995
- T. indistincta Krivosheina, 2004
- T. intemeliae Canzoneri & Meneghini, 1982
- T. madizans (Fallén, 1813)
- T. microchaeta Hendel, 1932
- T. shatalkini Krivosheina, 1993
