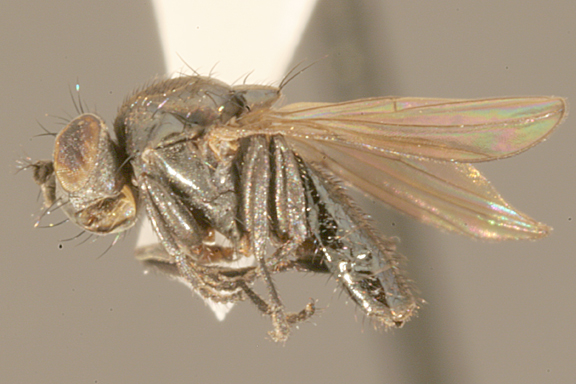
- Helaeomyia petrolei

Scientific classification
- Kingdom: Animalia
- Phylum: Arthropoda
- Class: Insecta
- Order: Diptera
- Family: Ephydridae
- Subfamily: Discomyzinae
- Tribe: Psilopini
- Genus: Helaeomyia; Cresson, 1941

Type species
- Psilopa petrolei Coquillett, 1899

Synonyms
- Mimapsilopa Cresson, 1941

= Helaeomyia =

Genus of flies

Helaeomyia is a genus of shore flies (insects in the family Ephydridae).

== Species ==
- Helaeomyia bacoa (Mathis & Zatwarnicki, 1998)
- Helaeomyia colombiana (Lizarralde de Grosso, 1982)
- Helaeomyia cressoni (Lizarralde de Grosso, 1982)
- Helaeomyia cubensis (Mathis & Zatwarnicki, 1998)
- Helaeomyia dominicana (Mathis & Zatwarnicki, 1998)
- Helaeomyia mathisi (Lizarralde de Grosso, 1982)
- Helaeomyia metatarsata (Cresson, 1939)
- Helaeomyia oligocarda (Lizarralde de Grosso, 1982)
- Helaeomyia petrolei (Coquillett, 1899)
- Helaeomyia schildi (Cresson, 1944)
