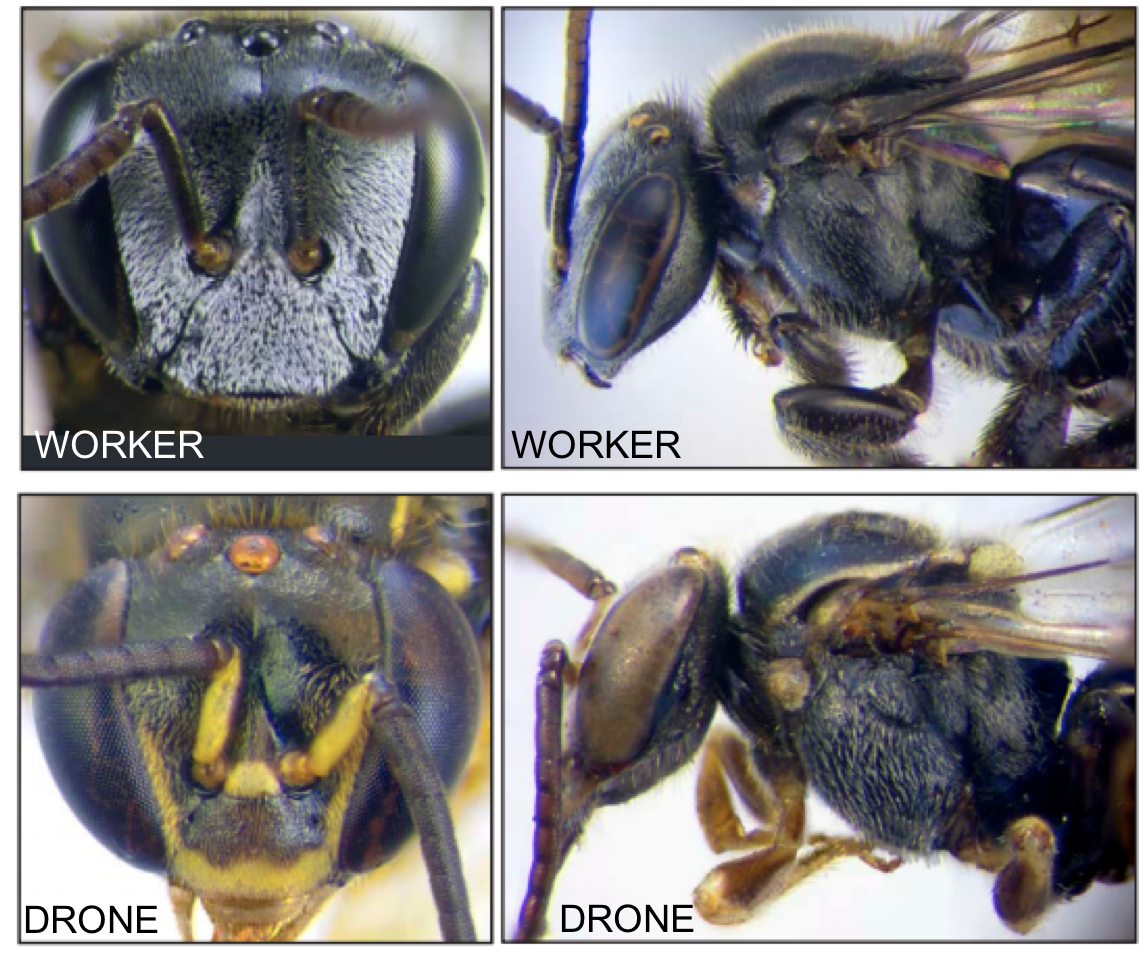
- Difference between workers and drones of A. cassiae

Scientific classification
- Kingdom: Animalia
- Phylum: Arthropoda
- Class: Insecta
- Order: Hymenoptera
- Family: Apidae
- Genus: Austroplebeia
- Species: A. cassiae

Binomial name
- Austroplebeia cassiae Cockerell, 1910
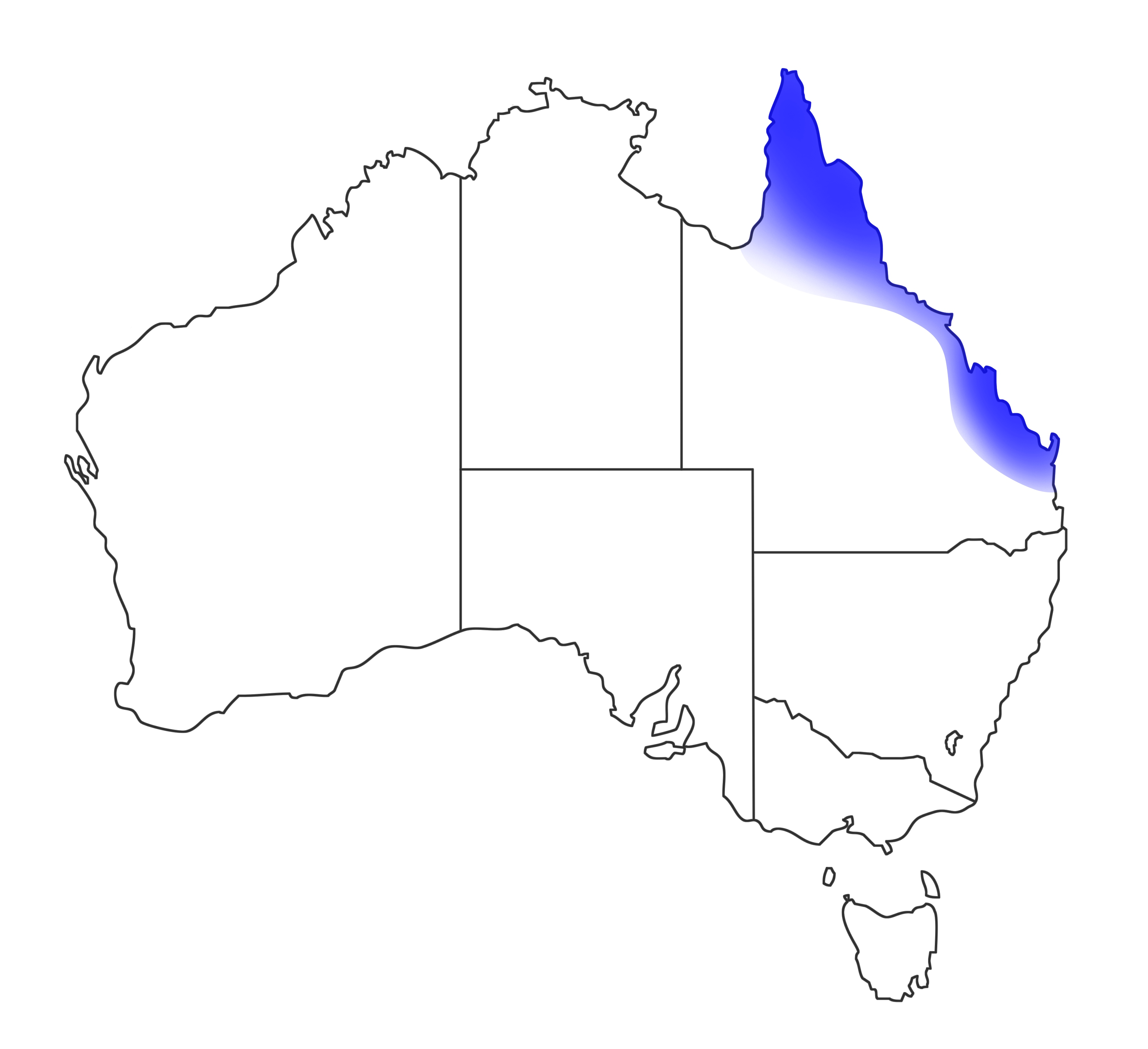
- Map showing the estimated current distribution of A. cassiae in Australia

Synonyms
- Trigona cassiae Cockerell, 1910; Trigona (Plebeia) australis Michener, 1961; A. cassiae Moure, 1961; T. cassiae Michener, 1965; T. symei Moure, 1961; A. symei Moure, 1961

= Austroplebeia cassiae =

Species of bee

Austroplebeia cassiae is a small eusocial stingless bee first described by Cockerell in 1910 and it is found in Australia (North and Eastern Queensland).

== Etymology ==
The name 'cassiae' was given because the first specimens were collected from Cassia flowers.

== Description and identification ==
The workers (3.4-4.5 mm) are darker in coloured compared to A. australis. The hind edge of their thorax usually only has two ochre or cream spots, or no marking at all. Their face has a thick white hair with at least one full marking hidden underneath it. The hair on the worker's face is much denser in A. cassiae than in A. australis. The males are brightly marked.

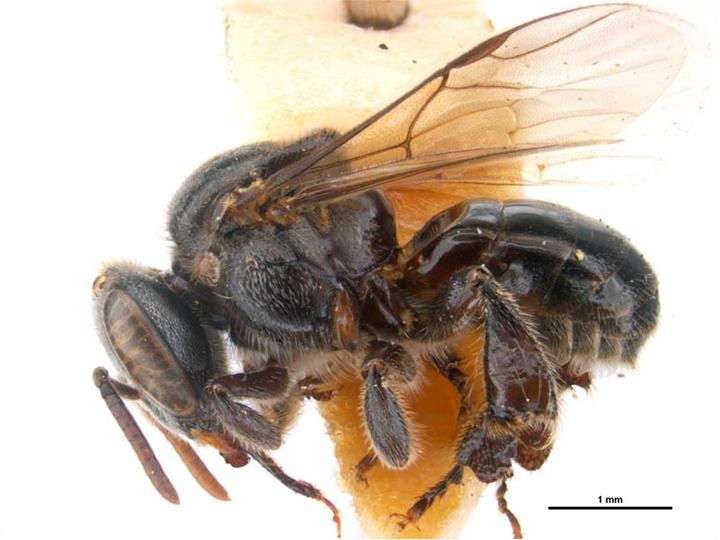
Austroplebeia cassiae worker. Scale bars = 1 mm

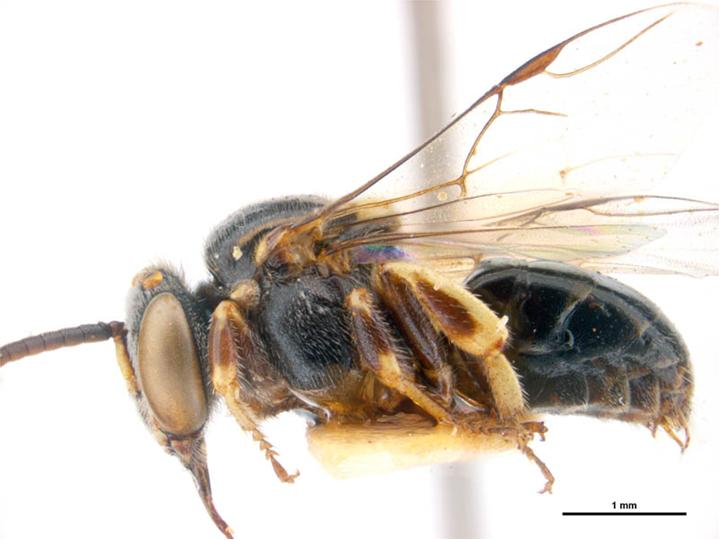
Austroplebeia cassiae drone. Scale bars = 1 mm

== Nest building ==
The nests of A. cassiae are usually larger in size than those of A. australis and they have more workers. They also have a short entrance tunnel compared to the rest of the Austroplebeia species. Like most species of Austroplebeia, A. cassiae constructs a lacy mesh of fine resin droplets around the entrance at night.

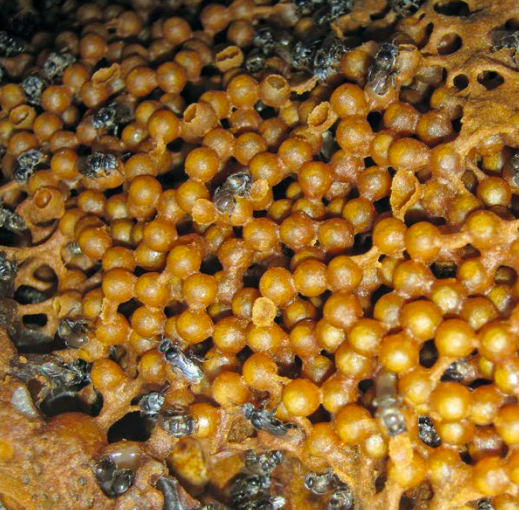
Clustered brood of A. cassiae

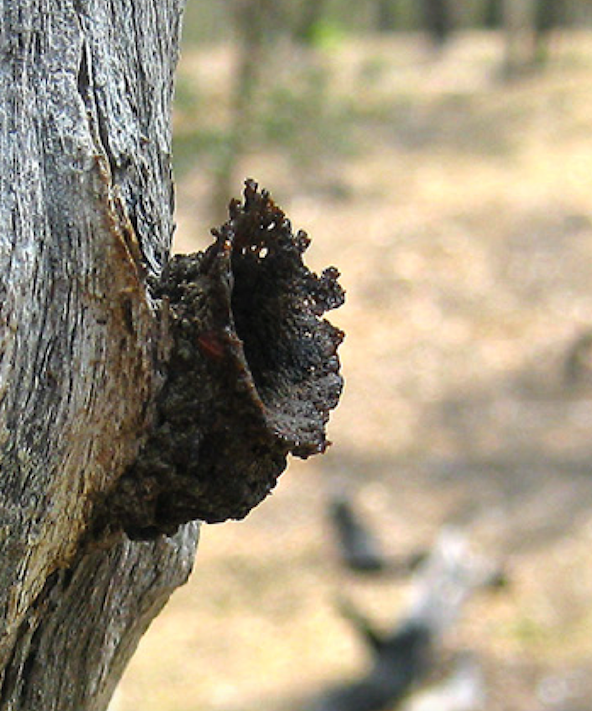
The short entrance tunnel of A. cassiae

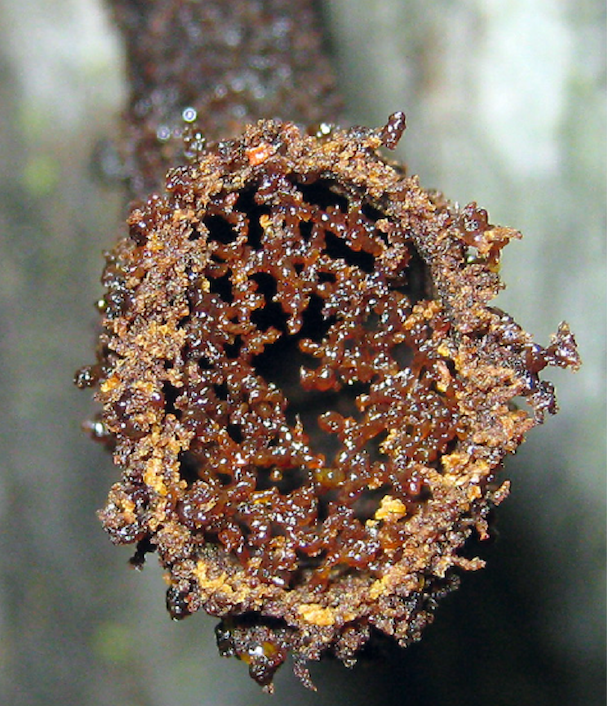
The fine resin droplets around the entrance of A. cassiae at night.

== Human use ==
This Austroplebeia species is the second most commonly kept in managed hives in Australia after A. australis. They can be readily transferred into hives and propagated. They are commonly kept in central Queensland, where it is naturally abundant.
