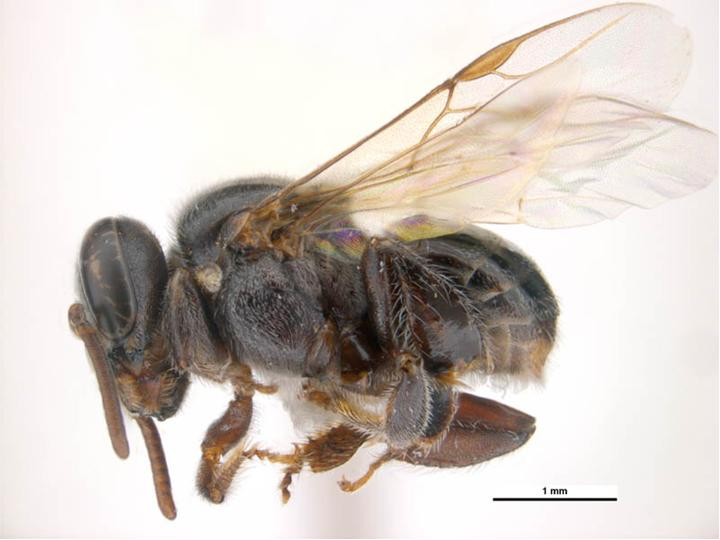
- Female worker
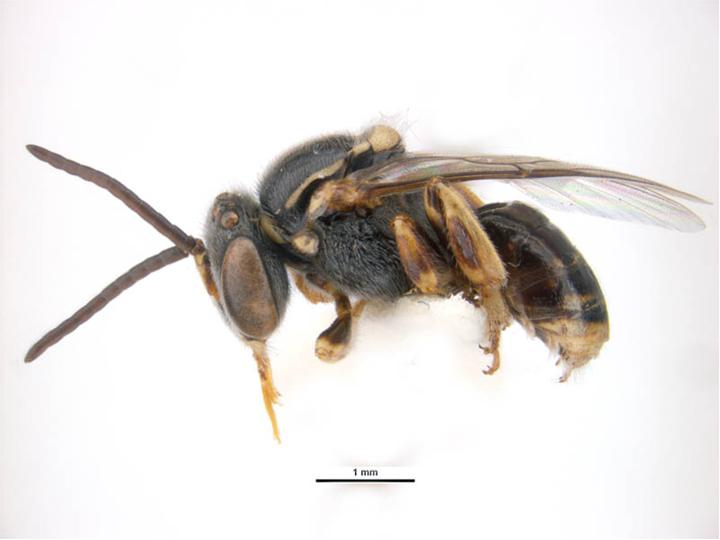
- Male drone

Scientific classification
- Kingdom: Animalia
- Phylum: Arthropoda
- Clade: Pancrustacea
- Class: Insecta
- Order: Hymenoptera
- Family: Apidae
- Clade: Corbiculata
- Tribe: Meliponini
- Genus: Austroplebeia
- Species: A. australis

Binomial name
- Austroplebeia australis (Friese, 1898)

Synonyms
- A. cockerelli Rayment, 1930; A. ornata Rayment, 1932; A. percincta Cockerell, 1929; A. websteri Rayment, 1932

= Austroplebeia australis =

Species of bee

Austroplebeia australis (previously and originally known as Trigona australis) is a stingless bee species in the tribe Meliponini first validly described by Heinrich Friese in 1898. Within Australia, they are occasionally referred to as bush bees.

The native range of A. australis extends more than 2,000 km, from the districts of Fitzroy and Central West Queensland, through the Darling Downs and into northern New South Wales, but is thought to be no further south than 31°04'S (Example: Hat Head National Park).

== Colony cycle ==
=== Activity ===
Colonies of A. australis tend to be active all year round. The daily activity period, however, is longer in the Southern Hemisphere's warmer months, late September to March. The intensity of these daily flights is greatest in September, and least intense in May. A temperature threshold exists on all of this activity. Flight and foraging activity is not observed until an ambient temperature rise of greater than 20 °C. This year-long period of activity is beneficial for the pollination of crops flowering at any time of the year.

Austroplebeia australis colonies tend to collect a narrow resource spectrum and focused on high-quality resources (i.e., nectar of significantly higher sugar concentrations), compared to other stingless bees such as Tetragonula carbonaria.

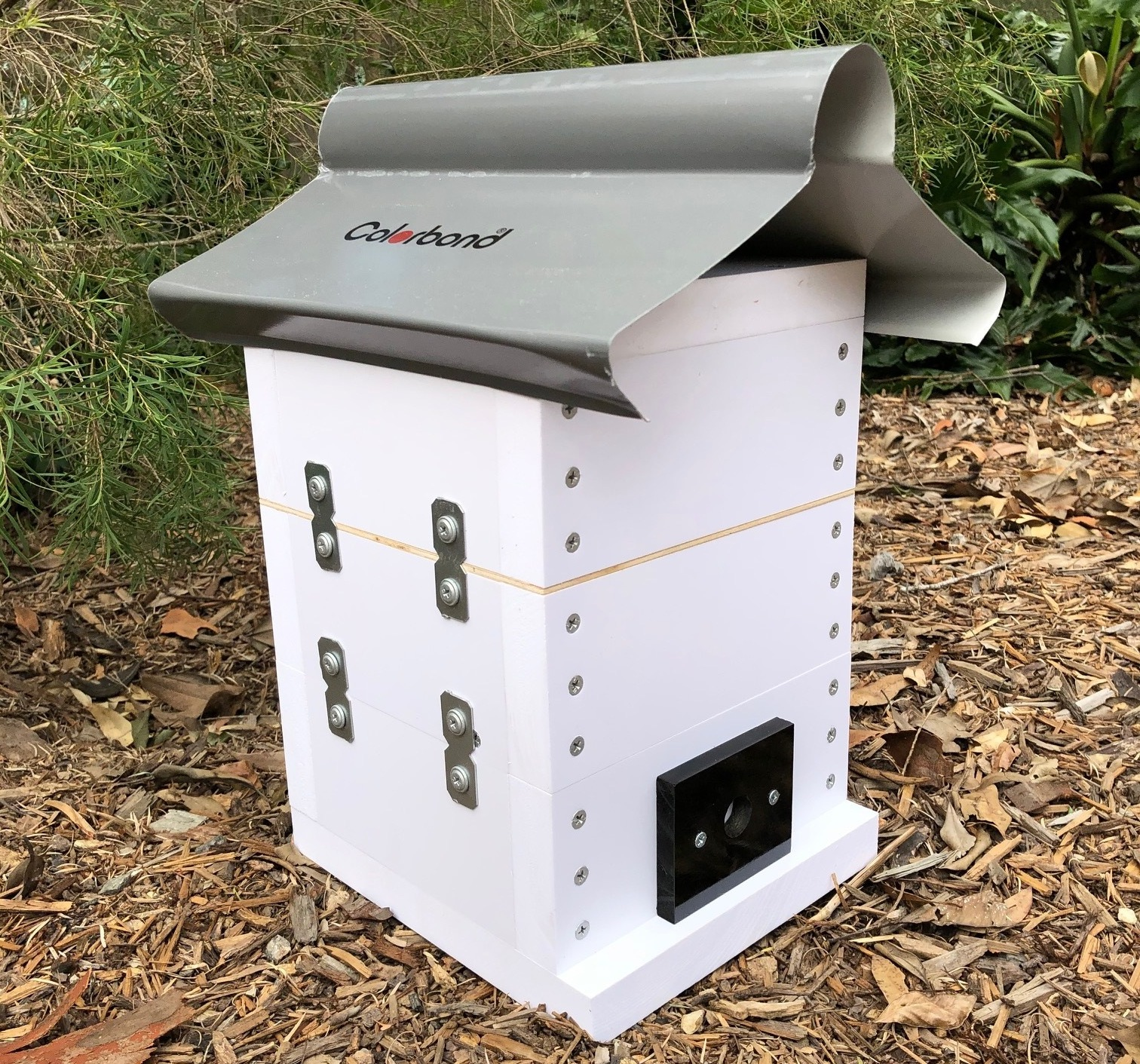
Mini OATH Bee Hive

== Interaction with other species ==
=== Predators ===
The typical predators for A. australis include many of the same predators for other Meliponini species, such as birds, lizards, spiders, and mammals.

=== Defence ===
Devoid the use of a stinger, the main defence for a stingless bee colony is the entrance. The entrance of the nest are reduced in size to the width of three to four bees wide. Most species within the Austroplebeia genus close their entrance at night with a sticky resinous substance. At dusk A. australis constructs a lacy curtain of cerumen at the entrance of the nest to aid in defence but this is also observed during inclement weather. The curtain is taken down each morning when the temperature starts to rise and stored for later reuse.

==== African small hive beetle ====
In a 2007 study by Megan Halcroft, A. australis successfully demonstrated its capability to defend against invasive African small hive beetles (Aethina tumida) that were intentionally introduced into the nest. The study showed that all introduced African small hive beetle eggs were eaten by the workers or destroyed by them within 24 hours, with 96% of the eggs consumed or destroyed within the first 90 minutes. Similarly introduced small hive beetle larvae were also removed, and adult small hive beetle were also removed or rendered entirely incapacitated by entombment in resin. It was concluded that healthy, strong colonies of A. australis that kept in undamaged hives and maintained which are faced with the African small hive beetles normal hive invasion mechanism, entering through the hive entrance, are more than capable to defend themselves. The defensive behaviour of A. australis is at an advantage with that compared to the European honey bee (Apis mellifera) against the African small hive beetle.

== Photo Gallery ==
Austroplebeia australis images
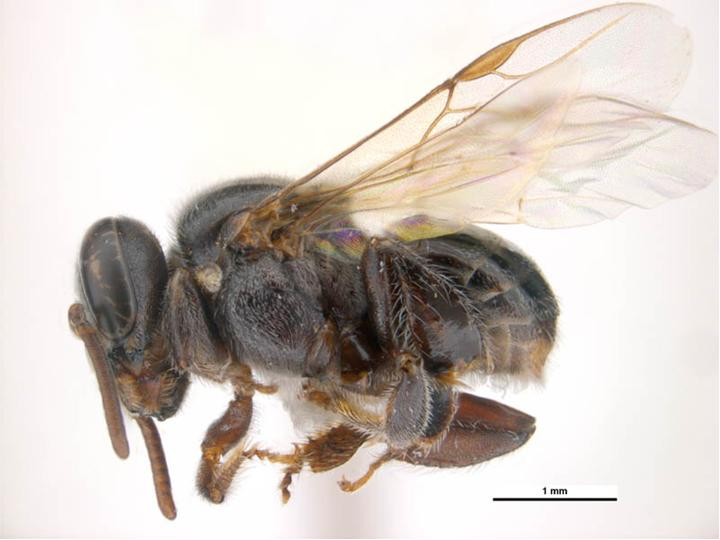
Female worker

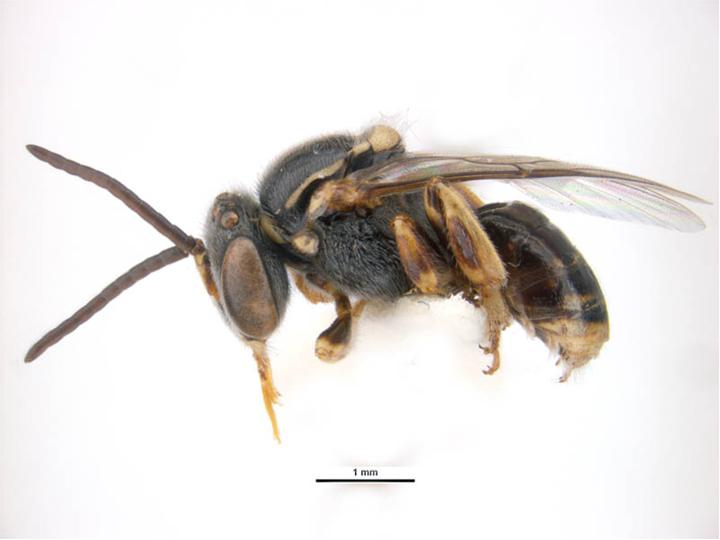
Male drone

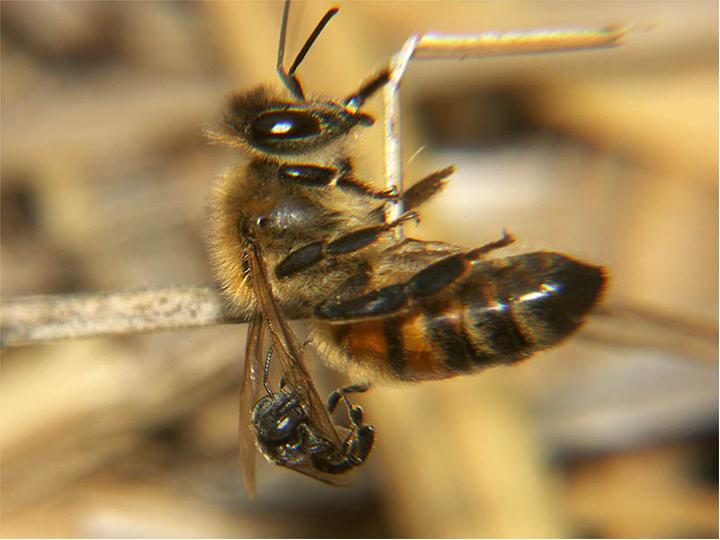
An Austroplebeia australis stingless bee defending against Apis mellifera

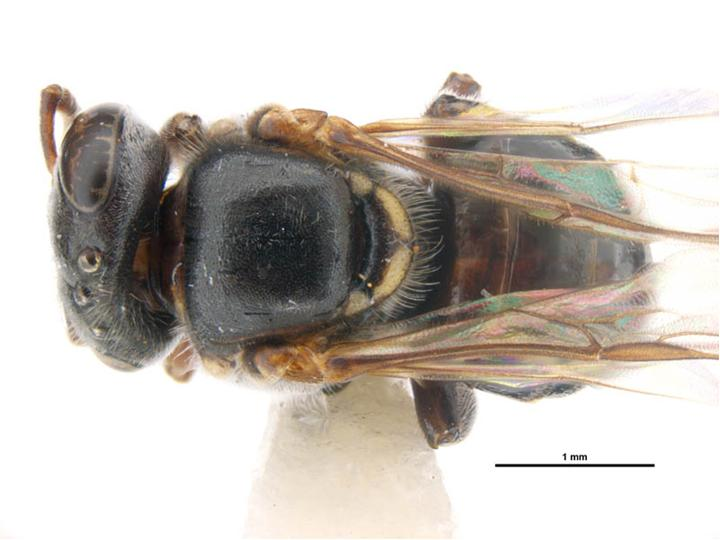
Female worker dorsal view

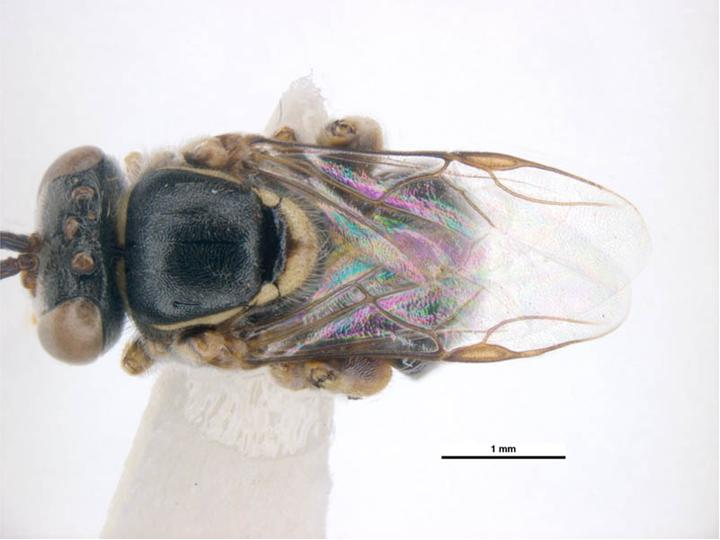
Male drone dorsal view
