= Alexander Mocsáry =

Hungarian entomologist

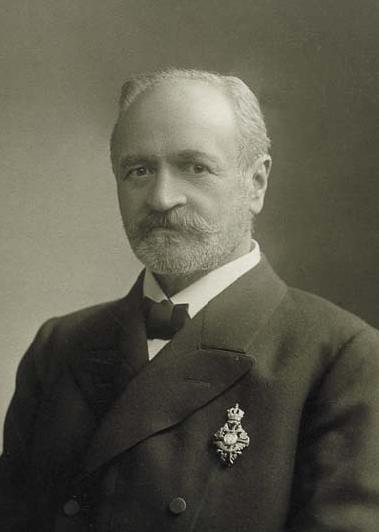
- Born: 27 September 1841; Nagyvárad
- Died: 26 December 1915 (aged 74); Budapest

Academic work
- Discipline: entomology
- Institutions: Hungarian Natural History Museum
- Main interests: Hymenoptera

Alexander Mocsary, sometimes Hungarian: Mocsáry Sándor (27 September 1841, Nagyvárad (Romanian: Oradea) - 26 December 1915, Budapest) was a Hungarian entomologist who specialised in Hymenoptera.

He was the Curator of the Hungarian Natural History Museum where his collection of mainly Hungarian insects of all orders is conserved. He described many new taxa.

== Works ==
- Ordo. Hymenoptera. In: Paszlavsky, J.: Fauna Regni Hungariae. Regia Societas Scientiarum Naturalium Hungarica, Budapest: 7–113 (1918)
