= Discomyzinae =

Scientific classification
- Kingdom: Animalia
- Phylum: Arthropoda
- Clade: Pancrustacea
- Class: Insecta
- Order: Diptera
- Family: Ephydridae
- Subfamily: Discomyzinae; Acloque, 1897

Subfamily of flies

Discomyzinae is a subfamily of shore flies in the family Ephydridae.

== Genera ==
Tribe Discomyzini Acloque, 1897

- Actocetor Becker, 1903
- Discomyza Meigen, 1830
- Clasiopella Hendel, 1914

Tribe Psilopini Cresson, 1942

- Achaetorisa Papp, 1980
- Ceropsilopa Cresson, 1917
- Clanoneurum Becker, 1903
- Cnestrum Becker, 1896
- Helaeomyia Cresson, 1941
- Leptopsilopa Cresson, 1922
- Psilopa Fallén, 1823
- Risa Becker, 1907
- Rhynchopsilopa Hendel, 1913
- Scoliocephalus Becker, 1903
- Trimerina Macquart, 1835
