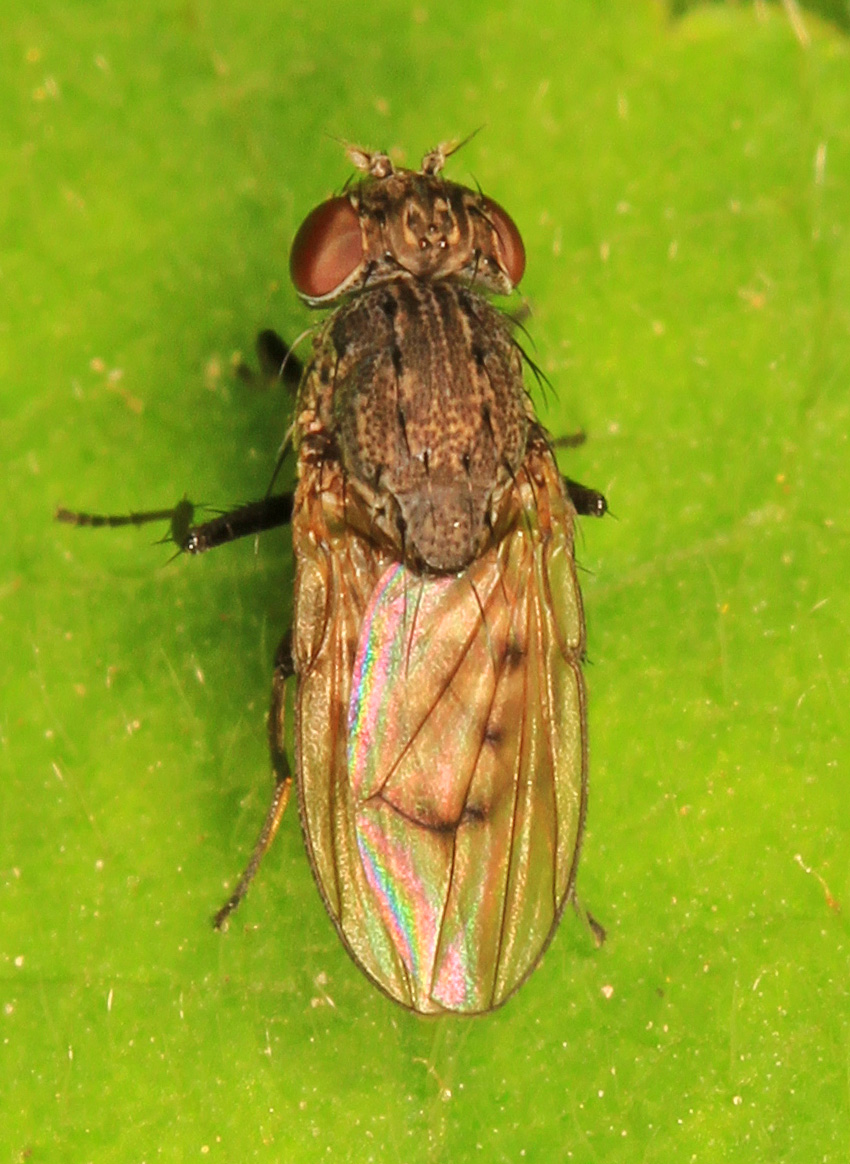
- Paralimna punctipennis

Scientific classification
- Kingdom: Animalia
- Phylum: Arthropoda
- Class: Insecta
- Order: Diptera
- Family: Ephydridae
- Subfamily: Hydrelliinae
- Tribe: Dryxini
- Genus: Paralimna; Loew, 1862

Type species
- Paralimna appendiculata Loew, 1862

= Paralimna =

Genus of flies

Paralimna is a genus of shore flies (insects in the family Ephydridae).

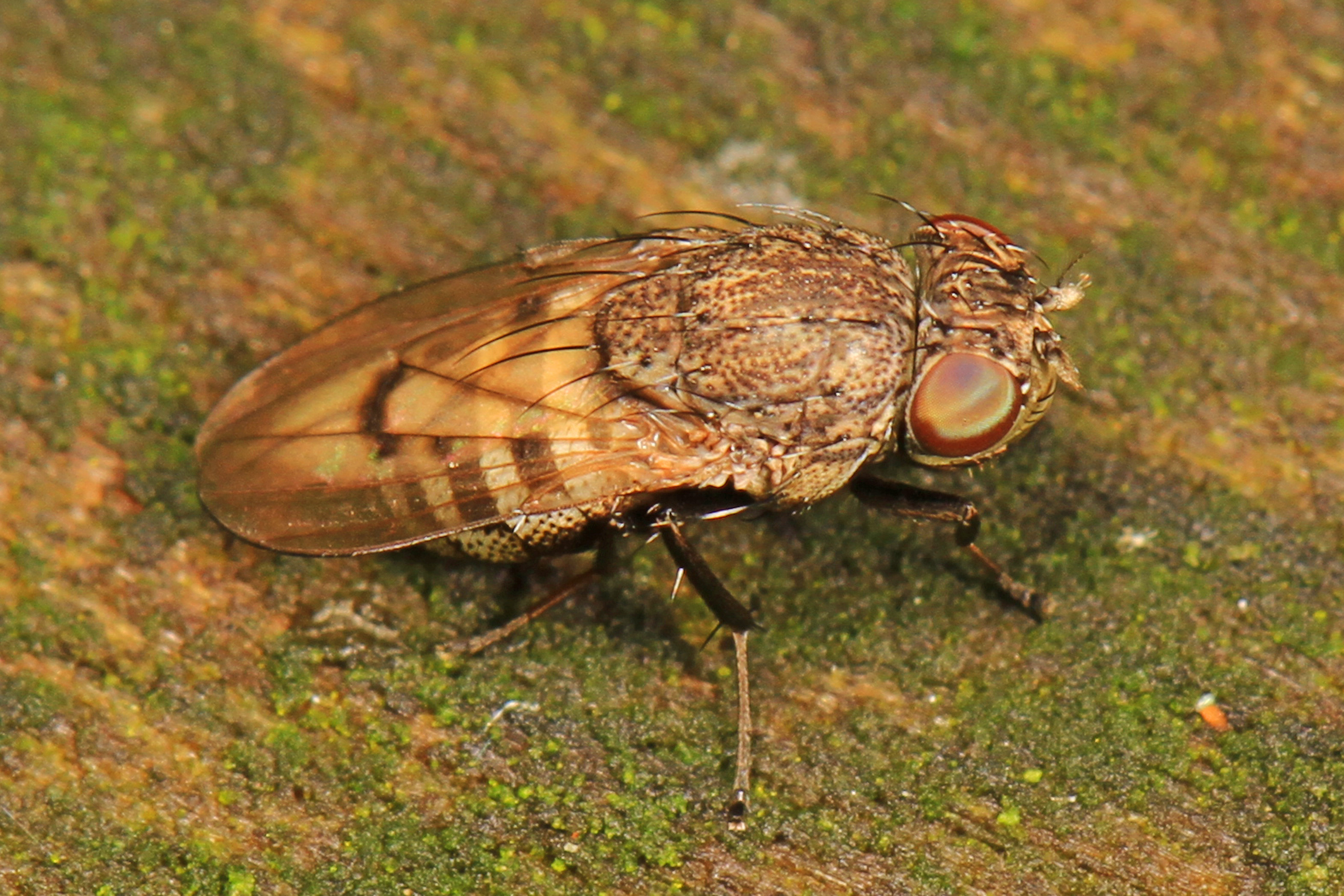
Paralimna punctipennis

== Species ==
- P. adunca Ale-Rocha & Mathis, 2015
- P. adversa Cresson, 1933
- P. afra (Wirth, 1956)
- P. albonotata Loew, 1862
- P. approximata Cresson, 1947
- P. arabica Becker, 1910
- P. argentea Cogan, 1968
- P. argyrostoma Cresson, 1916
- P. aurantia Ale-Rocha & Mathis, 2015
- P. aurantiacus (Giordani Soika, 1956)
- P. basilewskyi Giordani Soika, 1956
- P. bicolor (Macquart, 1851)
- P. bistriata Hendel, 1930
- P. boensis Canzoneri & Rampini, 1990
- P. brunneiceps Cresson, 1916
- P. calva Bock, 1988
- P. carolinika Cogan, 1968
- P. castanea Ale-Rocha & Mathis, 2015
- P. cilifera Hendel, 1930
- P. concors Cresson, 1929
- P. confluens Loew, 1862
- P. cressoni Cogan, 1968
- P. cruciata Cogan, 1968
- P. curta Ale-Rocha & Mathis, 2015
- P. dasycera Bezzi, 1908
- P. decipiens Loew, 1878
- P. dorina Cogan, 1968
- P. fellerae Mathis, 1997
- P. flavitarsis (Miyagi, 1977)
- P. flexineuris Cresson, 1916
- P. fulgifrons Ale-Rocha & Mathis, 2015
- P. fusca Bock, 1988
- P. gambiensis Canzoneri, 1989
- P. guineensis Canzoneri & Meneghini, 1969
- P. guttata Ale-Rocha & Mathis, 2015
- P. hirticornis Meijere, 1913
- P. insignis Meijere, 1911
- P. insolita Cogan, 1968
- P. invisa Giordani Soika, 1956
- P. isis (Becker, 1903)
- P. javana Wulp, 1891
- P. keiseri Cogan, 1968
- P. lamborni Cresson, 1947
- P. ligabuei Canzoneri, 1987
- P. limbata Loew, 1862
- P. lineata Meijere, 1908
- P. longiseta Mathis & Zatwarnicki, 2002
- P. lynx Cresson, 1933
- P. mackieae Cresson, 1947
- P. maculata Ale-Rocha & Mathis, 2015
- P. madecassa Giordani Soika, 1956
- P. major Meijere, 1911
- P. malleata Ale-Rocha & Mathis, 2015
- P. mariae Cogan, 1968
- P. meridionalis Cresson, 1916
- P. millepuncta Malloch, 1925
- P. molossus Schiner, 1868
- P. monstruosa Giordani Soika, 1956
- P. nebulosa Wirth, 1955
- P. nidor Cresson, 1933
- P. nigripes Adams, 1905
- P. nigropicta Cresson, 1916
- P. nubifer Cresson, 1929
- P. obscura Williston, 1896
- P. opaca Miyagi, 1977
- P. ornata Canzoneri & Meneghini, 1969
- P. ornatifrons Meijere, 1914
- P. pallida Ale-Rocha & Mathis, 2015
- P. pauca Ale-Rocha & Mathis, 2015
- P. pectinata Hendel, 1930
- P. picta Kertész, 1901
- P. piger Cresson, 1933
- P. pilosa Bock, 1988
- P. pleurivittata Cresson, 1916
- P. plumbiceps Cresson, 1916
- P. poecila Wirth, 1956
- P. pokuma Cresson, 1933
- P. pseudornata Canzoneri, 1986
- P. puncticollis Becker, 1922
- P. puncticornis Cresson, 1916
- P. punctipennis (Wiedemann, 1830)
- P. pupulata Cresson, 1939
- P. quadrifascia (Walker, 1860)
- P. reticulata Cogan, 1968
- P. rhodesiensis Cogan, 1968
- P. sana Cresson, 1929
- P. secunda Schiner, 1868
- P. sera Cresson, 1933
- P. setifemur Cresson, 1939
- P. sinensis (Schiner, 1868)
- P. spatiosa Bock, 1988
- P. sponsa Giordani Soika, 1956
- P. stellata Ale-Rocha & Mathis, 2015
- P. sticta Hendel, 1930
- P. stigmata Ale-Rocha & Mathis, 2015
- P. stirlingi Malloch, 1926
- P. taurus Cresson, 1916
- P. texana Cresson, 1915
- P. thomae (Wiedemann, 1830)
- P. uelensis Cogan, 1968
- P. ugandensis Cogan, 1968
- P. uniseta Malloch, 1925
- P. ustulata Wirth, 1956
- P. vansomereni Cresson, 1933
- P. velutina Ale-Rocha & Mathis, 2015
- P. wirthi Cogan, 1968
