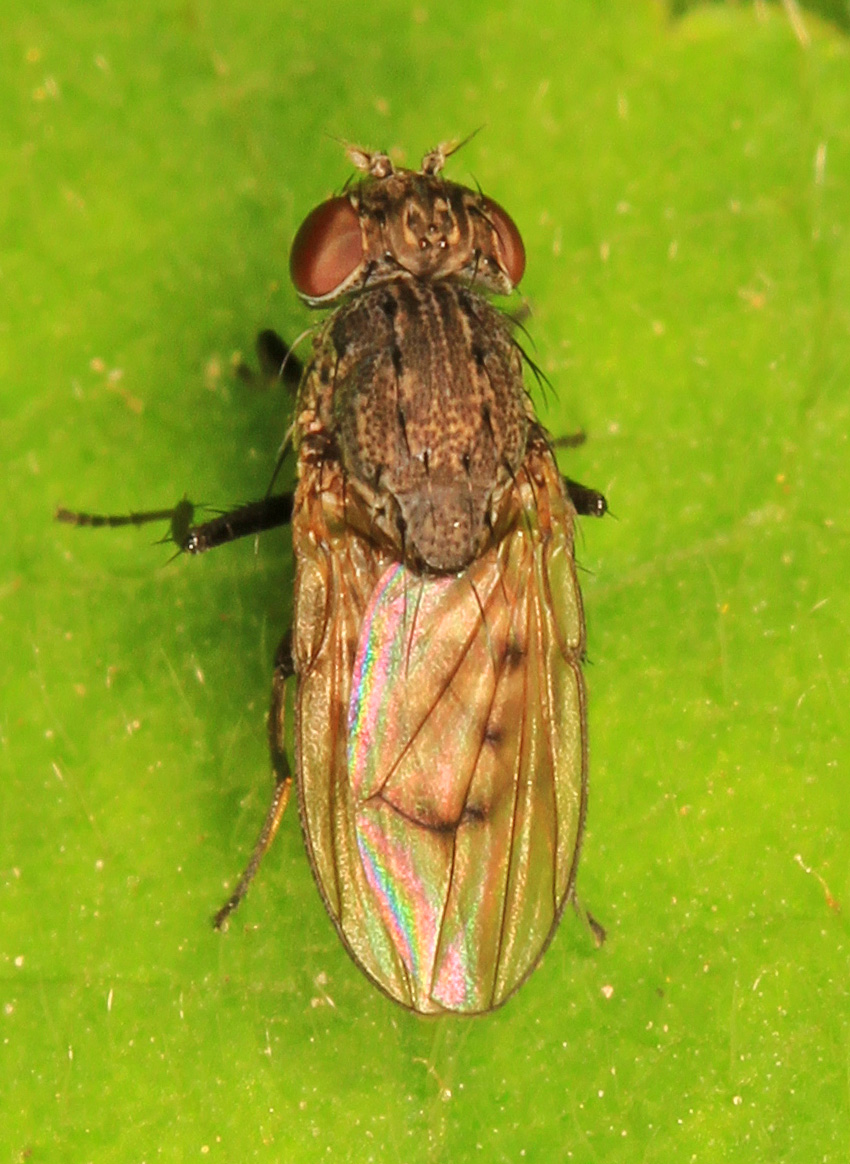

Scientific classification
- Kingdom: Animalia
- Phylum: Arthropoda
- Class: Insecta
- Order: Diptera
- Family: Ephydridae
- Subfamily: Hydrelliinae
- Tribe: Dryxini
- Genus: Paralimna
- Species: P. punctipennis

Binomial name
- Paralimna punctipennis (Wiedemann, 1830)

Synonyms
- Notiphila punctipennis Wiedemann, 1830; Paralimna appendiculata Loew, 1862

= Paralimna punctipennis =

Species of fly

Paralimna punctipennis is a species of shore flies (insects in the family Ephydridae).

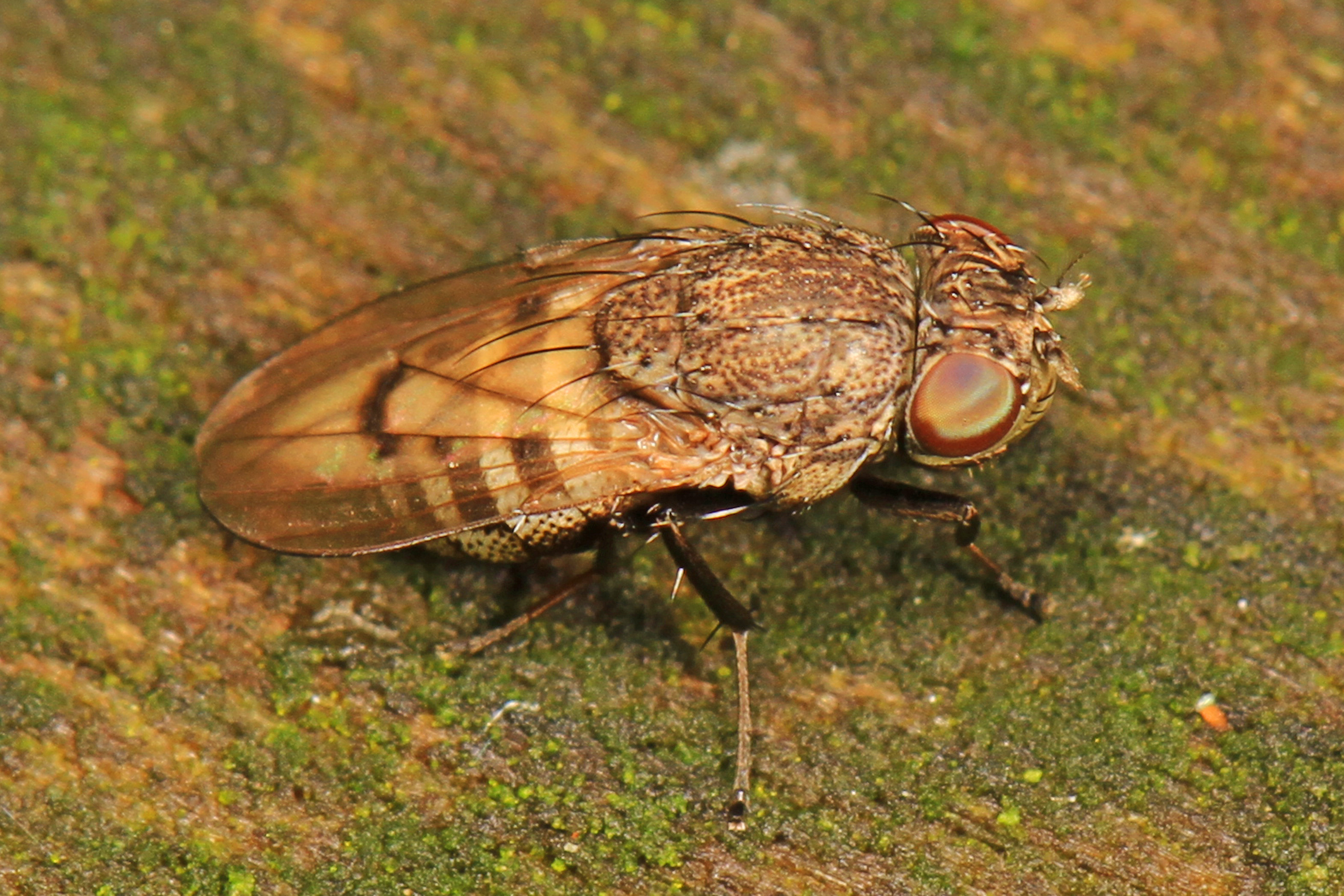

== Distribution ==
United States.
