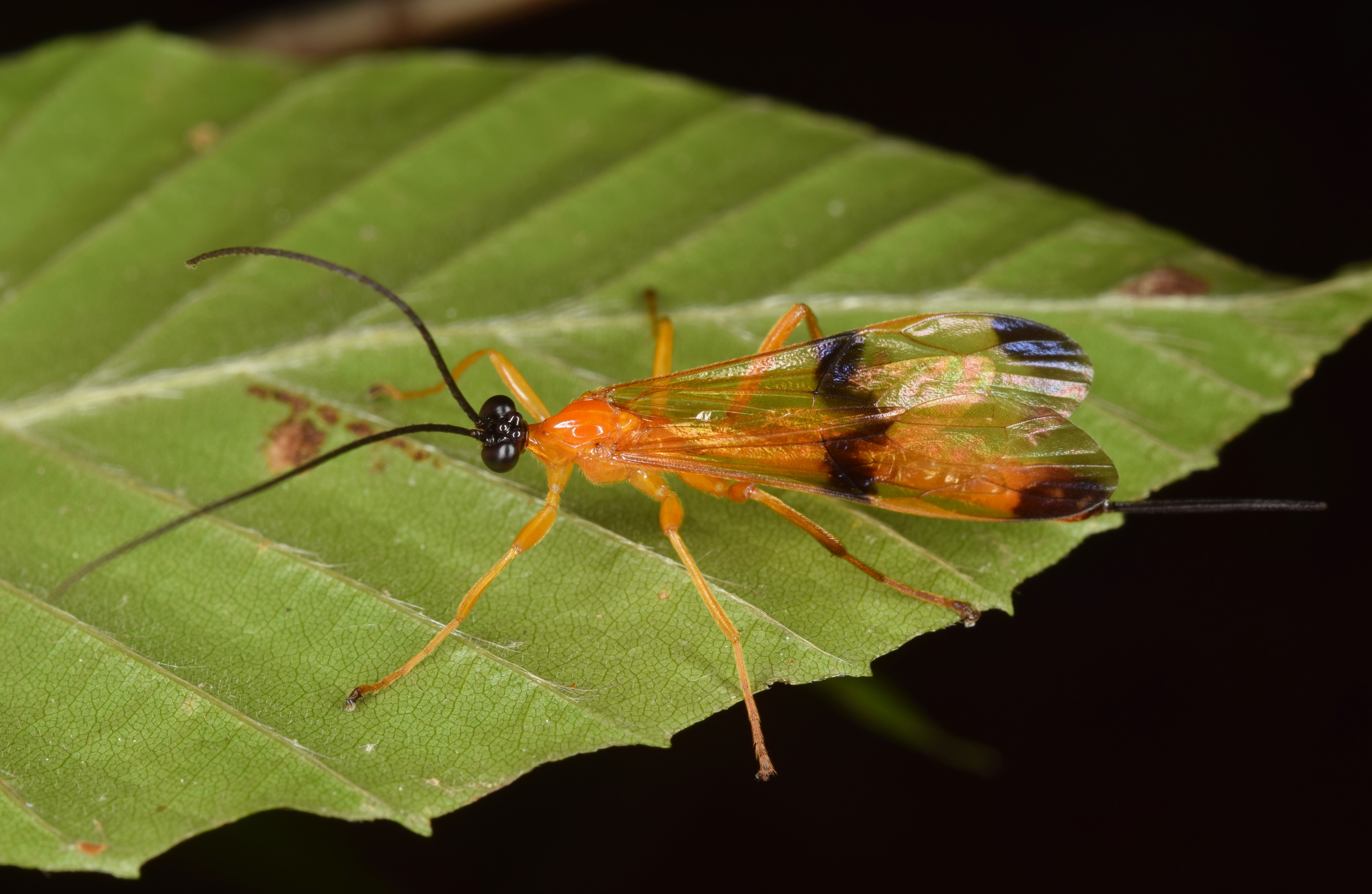

Scientific classification
- Domain: Eukaryota
- Kingdom: Animalia
- Phylum: Arthropoda
- Class: Insecta
- Order: Hymenoptera
- Family: Ichneumonidae
- Genus: Acrotaphus
- Species: A. wiltii

Binomial name
- Acrotaphus wiltii (Cresson, 1870)

= Acrotaphus wiltii =

Species of wasp

Acrotaphus wiltii is a species of ichneumon wasp in the family Ichneumonidae. It can be found in North America.
