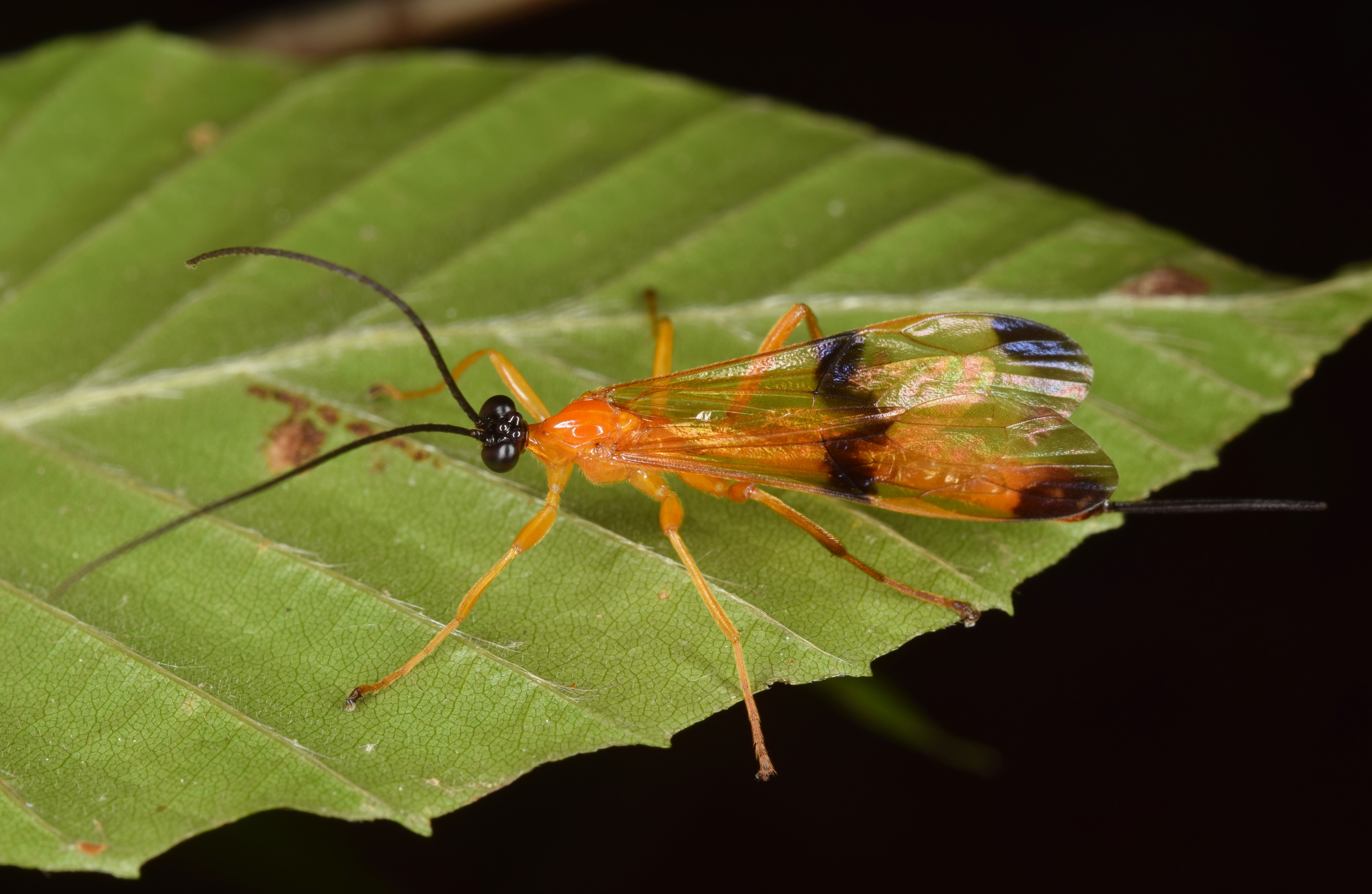
- Acrotaphus wiltii female

Scientific classification
- Kingdom: Animalia
- Phylum: Arthropoda
- Class: Insecta
- Order: Hymenoptera
- Family: Ichneumonidae
- Tribe: Ephialtini
- Genus: Acrotaphus; Townes & Townes, 1960

= Acrotaphus =

Genus of wasps

Acrotaphus is a genus of ichneumon wasps in the family Ichneumonidae. There are 27 described species in the genus. They are parasitoids of spiders in the families Araneidae and Tetragnathidae.

== Species ==
These 27 species belong to the genus Acrotaphus:

- Acrotaphus amajari (Pádua, 2020)
- Acrotaphus amazonicus (Pádua & Sääksjärvi, 2020)
- Acrotaphus bodoquenaensis (Pádua, 2020)
- Acrotaphus chedelae (Gauld, 1991)
- Acrotaphus cuzconus (Pádua & Sääksjärvi, 2020)
- Acrotaphus dolichopus (Pádua, 2020)
- Acrotaphus fasciatus (Brulle, 1846)
- Acrotaphus fascipennis (Cresson, 1865)
- Acrotaphus ferruginosus (Cresson, 1865)
- Acrotaphus franklini (Gauld, 1991)
- Acrotaphus fuscipennis (Cresson, 1865)
- Acrotaphus homeofranklini (Pádua, 2020)
- Acrotaphus jackiechani (Pádua & Sääksjärvi, 2020)
- Acrotaphus japi (Higa & Penteado-Dias, 2019)
- Arcotaphus kourou (Pádua & Sääksjärvi, 2020)
- Acrotaphus latifasciatus (Cameron, 1911)
- Acrotaphus mexicanus (Cameron, 1886)
- Acrotaphus micrus (Pádua, 2020)
- Acrotaphus monotaenius (Pádua, 2020)
- Acrotaphus nambilloensis (Pádua, 2020)
- Acrotaphus pseudoamazonicus (Pádua & Sääksjärvi, 2020)
- Acrotaphus pseudomexicanus (Pádua, 2020)
- Acrotaphus tibialis (Cameron, 1886)
- Acrotaphus venezuelanus (Pádua, 2020)
- Acrotaphus wagnerianae (Pádua, 2020)
- Acrotaphus wiltii (Cresson, 1870)
- Acrotaphus zampieronae (Pádua, 2020)

== Gallery ==
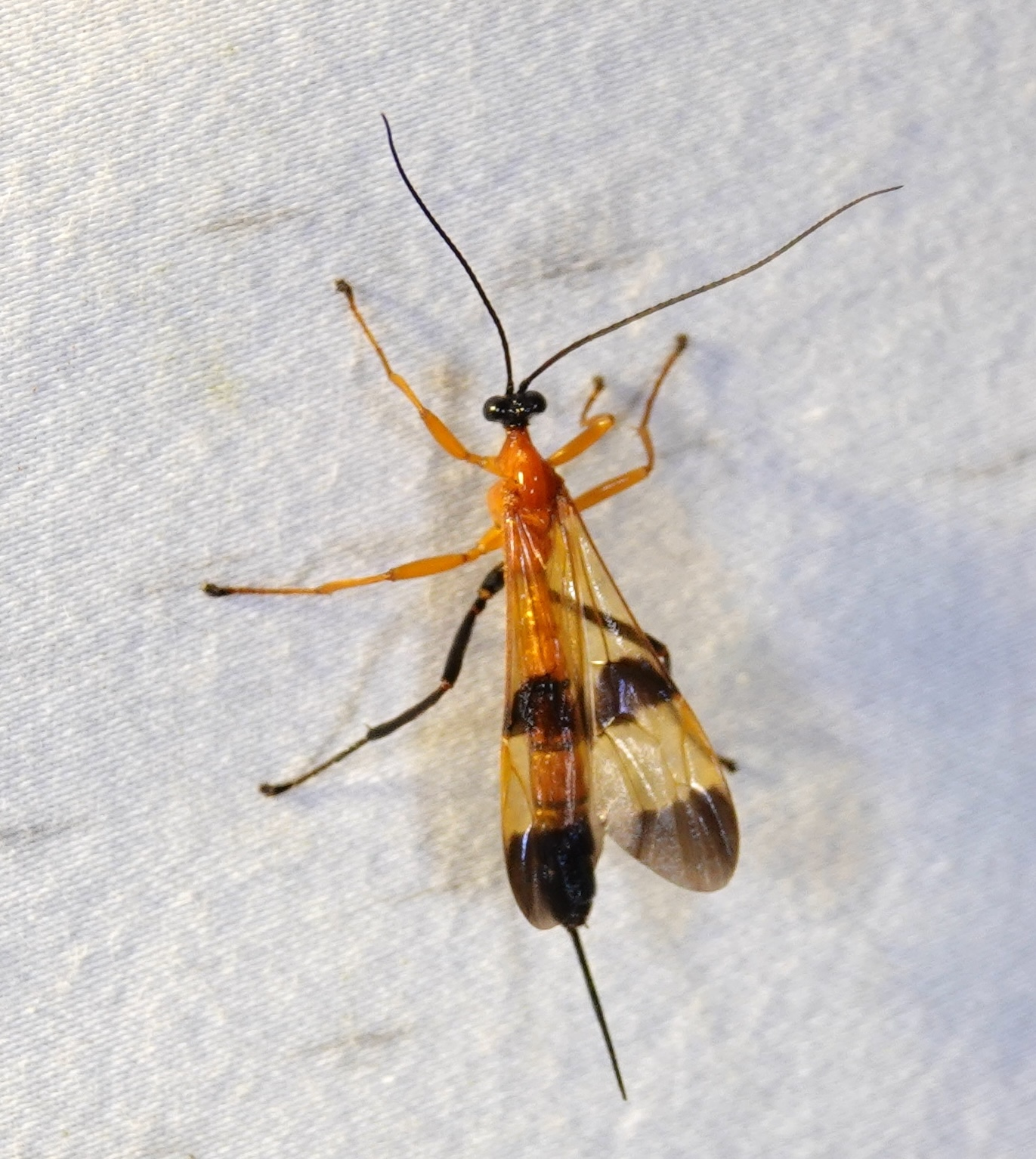
Acrotaphus fasciatus female

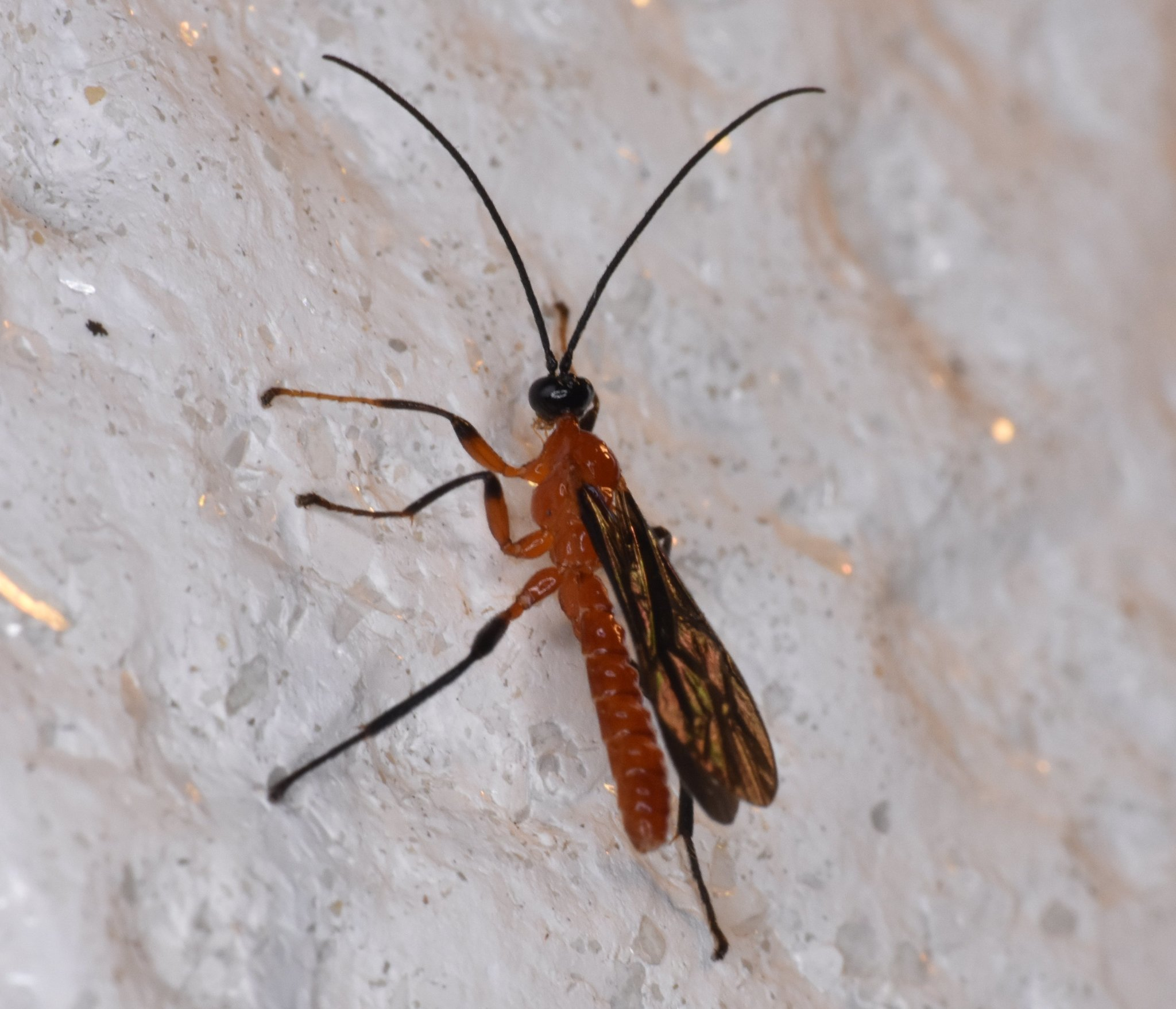
Acrotaphus fuscipennis male

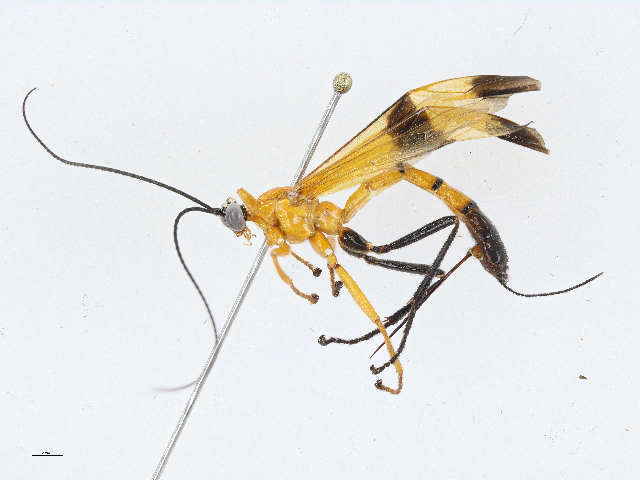
Acrotaphus latifasciatus female

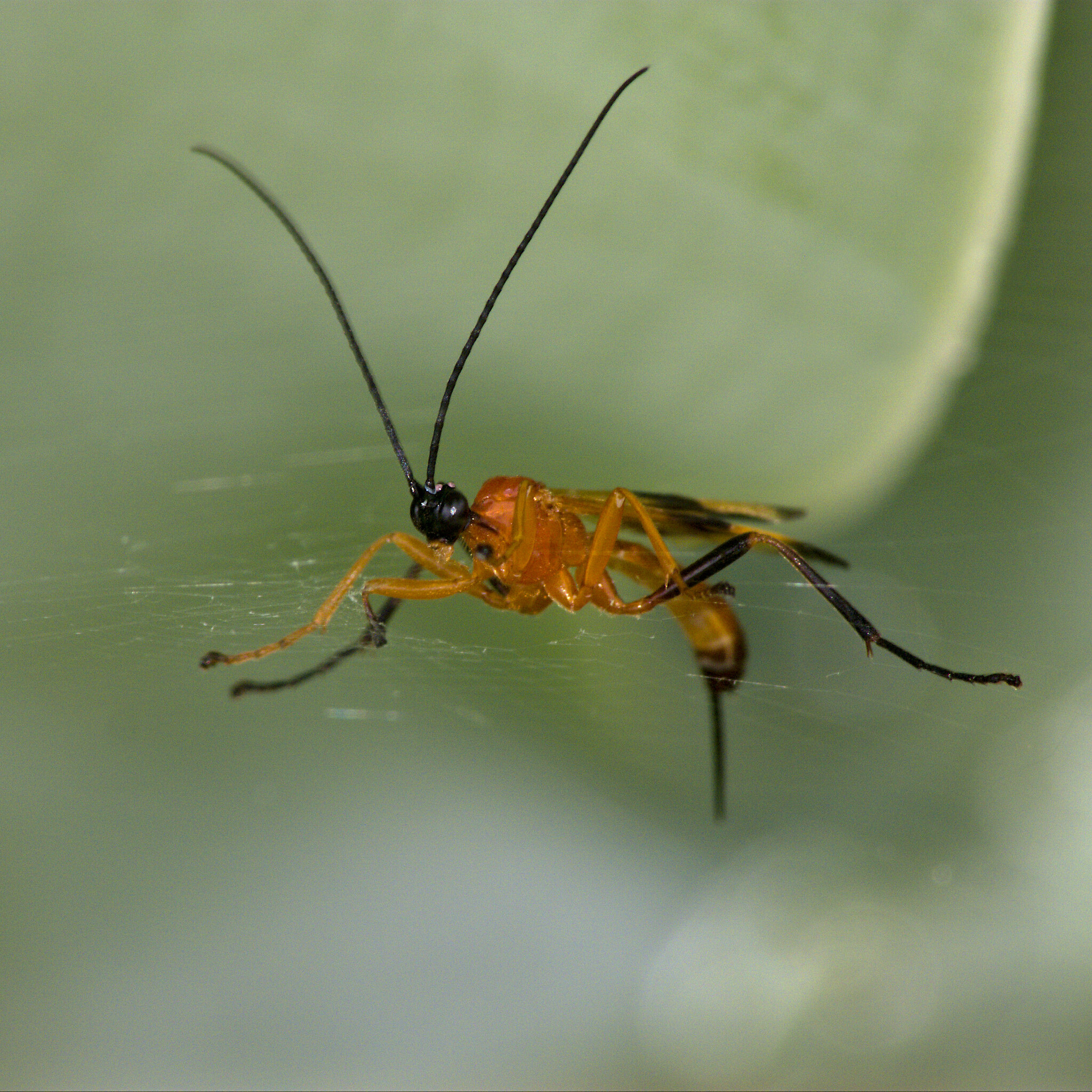
Acrotaphus tibialis female

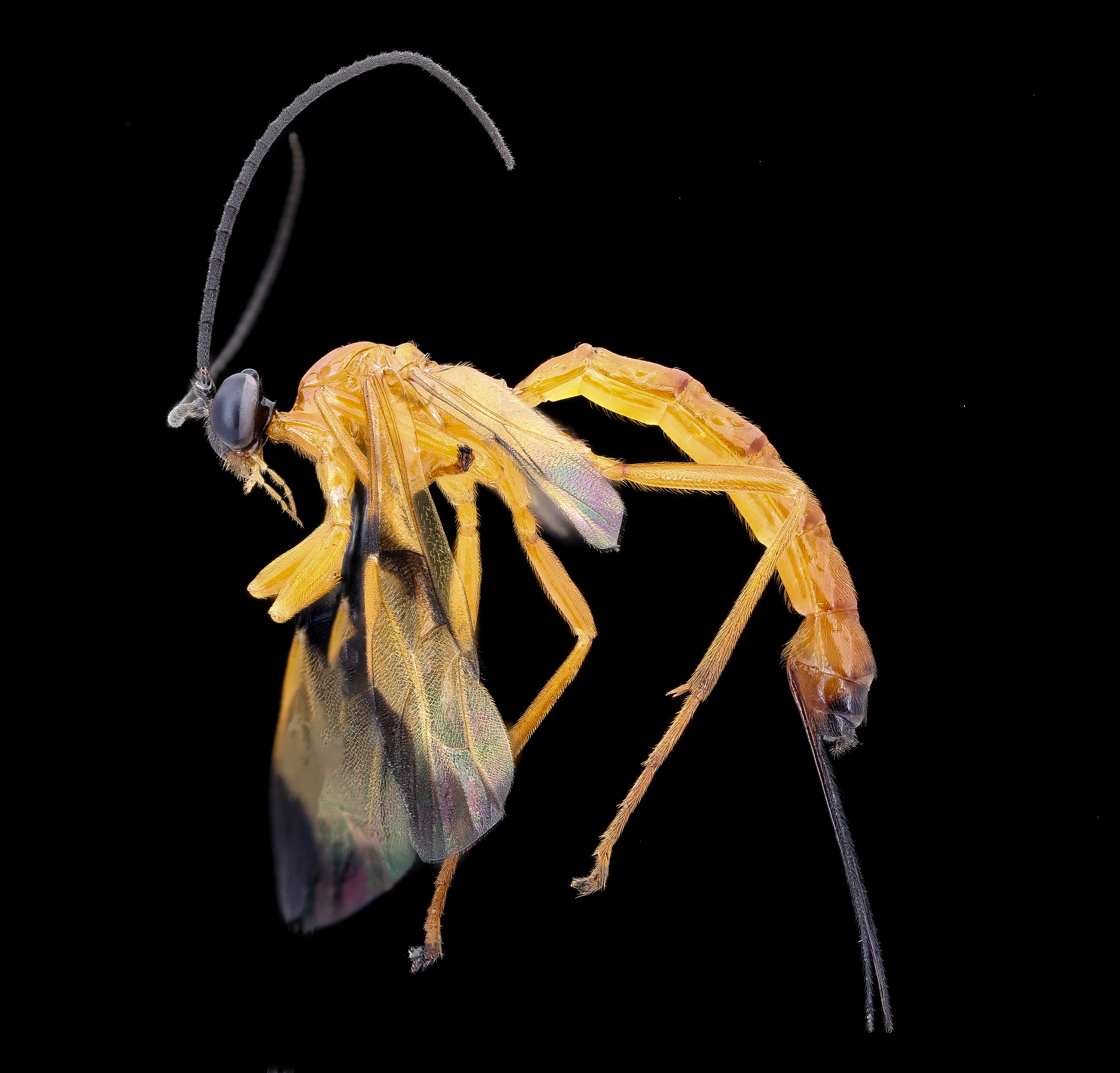
Acrotaphus wiltii female
