= Silvano Canzoneri =

Italian entomologist

Silvano Canzoneri (4 February 1941 in Corleone – 5 October 1995 in Venice) was an Italian entomologist.

Canzoneri specialized in Coleoptera, especially Tenebrionidae, Diptera and Ephydridae.
